= Adamson Tannehill =

American politician (1750–1820)

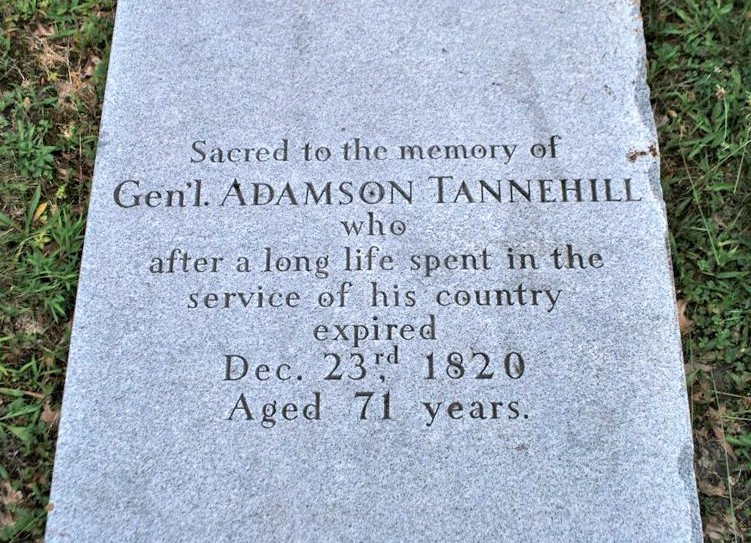
- Gravestone of Adamson Tannehill, Allegheny Cemetery in Pittsburgh, Pennsylvania

Member of the U.S. House of Representatives from Pennsylvania's 14th district
- In office March 4, 1813 – March 3, 1815
- Preceded by: Seat newly established
- Succeeded by: John Woods

Personal details
- Born: May 23, 1750 Frederick County, Province of Maryland, British America
- Died: December 23, 1820 Pittsburgh, Pennsylvania, US
- Resting place: Allegheny Cemetery, Pittsburgh, Pennsylvania, US
- Party: Democratic-Republican
- Spouse: Agnes Maria Morgan or Agnes Maria Heth
- Profession: Military officer, politician, justice of the peace, and civic leader

Military service
- Allegiance: United States of America
- Branch/service: Continental Army; Pennsylvania militia; United States Volunteers
- Years of service: 1775–1781; 1788–1812
- Rank: Captain (Continental Army); Brigadier general (United States Volunteers); Major general (Pennsylvania militia)
- Battles/wars: American Revolutionary War; War of 1812

Adamson Tannehill (May 23, 1750 – December 23, 1820) was an American military officer, politician, civic leader, and active participant in the early development of Pittsburgh and western Pennsylvania. Born in Frederick County, Maryland, Tannehill was among the first volunteers to join the newly established Continental Army during the American Revolutionary War, serving from June 1775 until 1781. He reached the rank of captain and was commander of the Maryland and Virginia Rifle Regiment, the longest-serving Continental rifle unit of the war. He participated in several major engagements, including the battles of Trenton, Princeton, and Saratoga. After the conflict, Tannehill settled in Pittsburgh, Pennsylvania, his last military posting of the war. He was active in the Pennsylvania state militia, advancing to major general in 1811. Tannehill also served as a brigadier general of United States Volunteers in the War of 1812.

Tannehill was an early citizen of Pittsburgh and a Pennsylvania politician who held local, state, and national appointed and elected offices. These included one session as a Democratic-Republican in the Pennsylvania House of Representatives in 1791, one term in the U.S. House of Representatives from 1813 to 1815, and president of the Pittsburgh branch of the Bank of the United States from 1817 until his death in 1820. He also served on commissions of civic and state organizations. In late 1800, Tannehill, while a justice of the peace, was alleged to have charged more than was allowed by law for two probate cases and was convicted of extortion. Shortly after, the governor of Pennsylvania remitted the charges and reinstated him to office.

Tannehill died in 1820 near Pittsburgh, Pennsylvania. He was buried at his Grove Hill home outside Pittsburgh and reinterred in Allegheny Cemetery in 1849.

== Early years ==
Adamson Tannehill was born May 23, 1750, in Frederick County, Maryland, the oldest of nine children born to John Tannehill, owner of a tobacco plantation, and Rachel Adamson Tannehill. Adamson's maternal grandfather took a special interest in the grandchild who bore his name, and he provided "such pecuniary assistance as to secure a fine education" for him. Little else is known of Adamson's youth and upbringing. No portraits of him are known to exist; family records state that as an adult he "was six feet in height, well proportioned and of commanding appearance".

== Revolutionary War service ==
=== Eastern theater ===
Tannehill was among the first volunteers to enlist in one of the earliest American military units to form when the American Revolutionary War started in the spring of 1775. He served in the Continental Army, initially as the orderly sergeant in Captain Thomas Price's Independent Rifle Company, one of the original 10 independent rifle companies authorized by the Continental Congress on June 14, 1775. He received his officer's commission as a third lieutenant in January 1776 while serving at the siege of Boston. At New York in mid-July, Tannehill and his company were incorporated into the newly organized Maryland and Virginia Rifle Regiment, when he advanced to second lieutenant. That summer and fall, many of the regiment's officers, including Tannehill, recruited for the unit back in the two states and then moved the enlistees to the American army in New York.

In mid-November 1776, a large portion of Tannehill's regiment was captured or killed at the Battle of Fort Washington on northern Manhattan Island. The remainder—about one-third of the unit, including Tannehill, who had still been away recruiting—continued to serve actively in the Continental Army. That winter, they participated in the American victories at the battles of Trenton, Assunpink Creek, and Princeton and in the early 1777 skirmishing in northern New Jersey, a period termed the Forage War. The following spring, they were administratively attached to the 11th Virginia Regiment in part because of the losses suffered by their rifle regiment. The riflemen also served as an experienced, if small, force to bolster this newly formed Virginia unit.

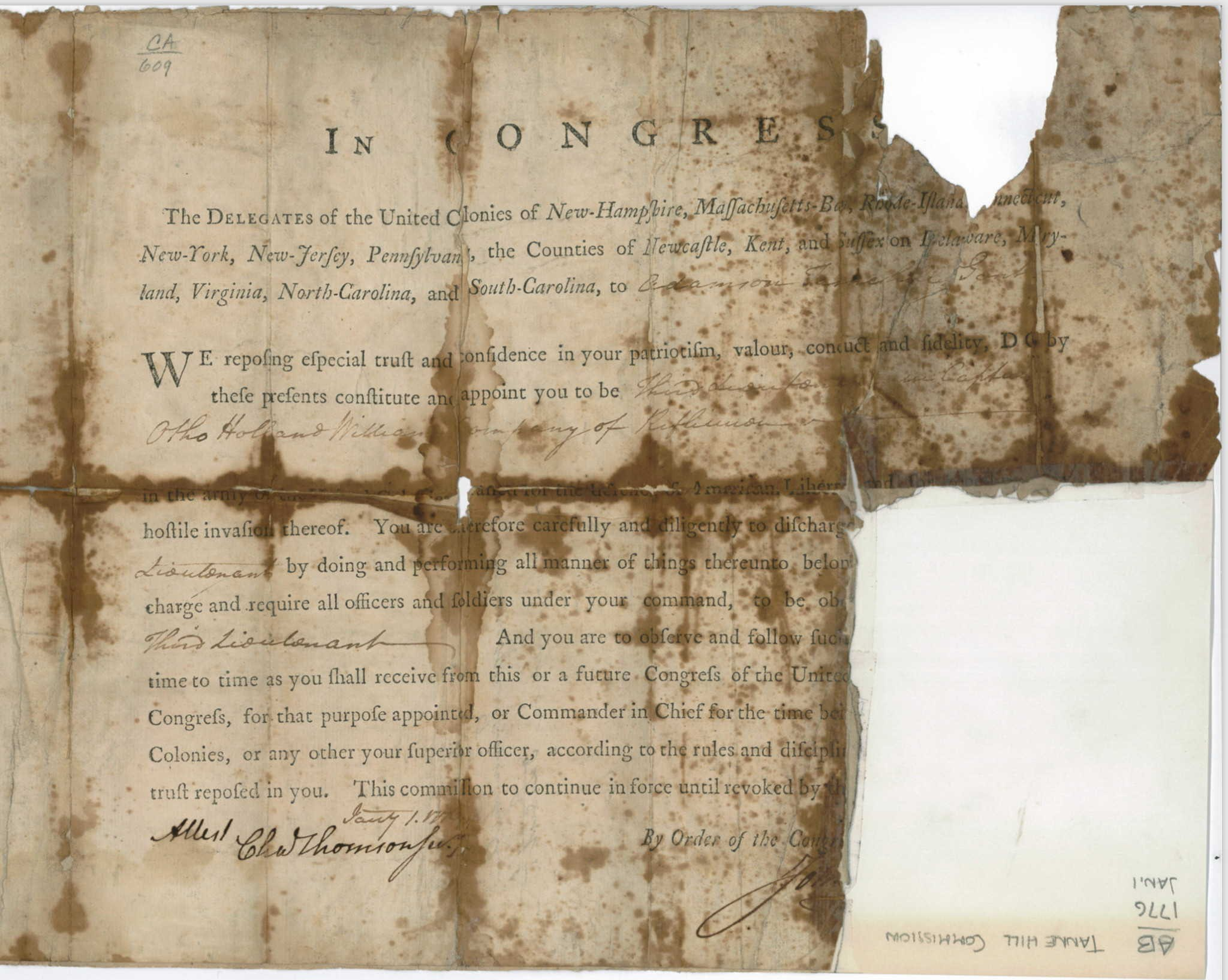
A Continental Army officer's commission for Third Lieutenant "Adamson Tannehill, Gent[leman]" of Captain Otho Holland Williams' Independent Rifle Company, dated January 1, 1776. Williams had replaced Thomas Price as captain of the company in late 1775

Tannehill was promoted to first lieutenant in May 1777, and the following month he was attached to the just-organized Provisional Rifle Corps commanded by Colonel Daniel Morgan. Deployed as specialized light infantry, this regiment-size force of about 500 riflemen played pivotal roles in the American victories at the battles of Saratoga and White Marsh in late 1777 and a peripheral role in the tactically inconclusive Battle of Monmouth in June 1778. The rifle corps was also notable for its scouting and outpost duties in defense of the Continental Army's Valley Forge encampment during the winter and spring of 1777–1778. For the last half of 1778, Tannehill and the unit served in south-central New York, where they assisted in countering depredations to settlements by Loyalist units and British-allied Iroquois warriors. The most noteworthy operation in which the riflemen participated was the raid on Unadilla and Onaquaga in early October. Tannehill was detached from the rifle corps at the start of 1779, when he returned to the Maryland and Virginia Rifle Regiment (his permanent unit).

In January 1779, Tannehill was ordered to Fort Cumberland, western Maryland, to help recruit three companies "to the full complement" for the undermanned Maryland and Virginia Rifle Regiment. This action was part of a formal reorganization of the unit conducted in advance of the regiment′s relocation to Fort Pitt in western Pennsylvania. Acting under the same orders, Lieutenant Colonel Moses Rawlings, the rifle regiment's commander, was also working that winter and spring to rebuild the unit by recruiting new members and marshaling returning prisoners of war while stationed at Fort Frederick, Maryland. (Rawlings had been captured at the Battle of Fort Washington and exchanged from British captivity in early 1778. After his release, he was assigned command of the prisoner-of-war camp and its militia guard at Fort Frederick. As a result, the elements of the rifle regiment still in the field continued to be led by the company officers.) In furtherance of the officers' efforts to muster their regiment, General George Washington ordered in February 1779 "all the men belonging to [...] Rawlings's Regimt. now doing duty in the line are to be delivered up to Lieutenant Tanneyhill [sic] of said regiment upon his demanding them." Tannehill supervised the assembly of the regiment because of the temporary absence of its acting commander.

=== Western theater ===
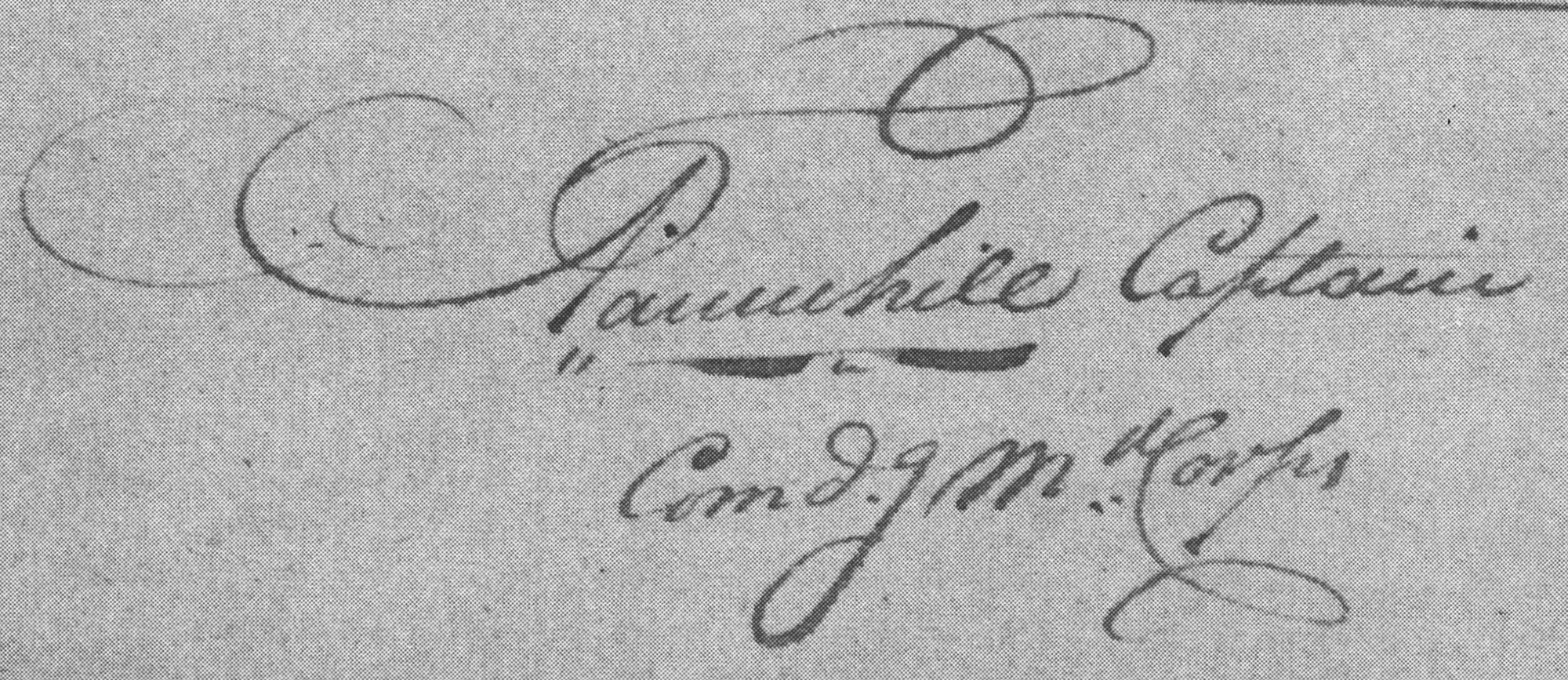
Signature of Adamson Tannehill, "Captain Comdg Md Corps", from a troop tally taken at Fort Pitt on December 25, 1780. By 1779, his rifle regiment comprised mostly Marylanders and was commonly known as the "Maryland Corps"

In the early spring of 1779, Tannehill and the rifle regiment were ordered to proceed to Fort Pitt of the war's western theater. There, they supported other Continental forces in defending frontier settlements from raids by British-allied Indian tribes. (Lieutenant Colonel Rawlings did not accompany his men to Fort Pitt and resigned his command of the regiment shortly after its arrival there in late May.) The high mark of this effort, in which Tannehill and his regiment took part, was the tactically successful 605-man Brodhead Expedition against hostile Mingo, Munsee, and Seneca Indians along the upper reaches of the Allegheny River conducted in the late summer of 1779. Continental Army Western Department commander Colonel Daniel Brodhead considered the Iroquoian Mingo to be "the principal distressers of [...the] settlements" at that time, especially north and west of Fort Pitt. Consequently, the rifle regiment was also deployed in detachments to support Continental infantry units at Fort McIntosh, Fort Laurens, Holliday's Cove Fort, and Fort Henry in western Pennsylvania, eastern Ohio, and northern West Virginia. Tannehill was promoted to captain in July 1779, and by late 1780 commanded the regiment and was commandant of Fort McIntosh.

=== Disbanding and discharge ===
Tannehill was honorably discharged from service on January 1, 1781, when several regiments, including Tannehill's, were disbanded as a result of Congress's major 1781 reorganization of the Continental Army instituted to reduce expenditures and increase organizational efficiency. In a letter to Major General William Smallwood penned on December 25, 1780, Tannehill made note of his regiment's formal disbanding and the termination of his own period of service to occur seven days later. (Smallwood was Maryland's highest-ranking military officer at this time in the war.) Tannehill's objective was to gain Smallwood's personal assistance in securing a position for himself in the Maryland Line because of his "great desire of Continuing in the Service of [...his] Country". Tannehill further affirmed "I shall do every thing [sic] in my power to keep [...the men] together till I have some instructions [from you] respecting them". Despite this entreaty, Smallwood could not grant Tannehill's request because of the recent congressional directive.

At the close of the war in 1783, Tannehill was admitted as one of the original 80 Maryland members of the Society of the Cincinnati, a fraternal organization of Continental Army officers. He served in the Continental Army for five and a half years; his Maryland and Virginia Rifle Regiment was active for only one year less, making it the longest-serving Continental rifle unit of the war.

== Relocation to Pittsburgh ==
After his war service, Tannehill settled in frontier Pittsburgh, as did many other Revolutionary War officers. He was initially a tavern keeper and vintner. By as early as 1784, he owned land—a city land lot he purchased for his tavern and first home directly from the heirs of William Penn. Later, when not devoting time to public office, he was involved in farming and land investing in the Pittsburgh area. He also represented others as an attorney-in-fact in selling land and general accounting. Like a number of prominent men of Pittsburgh, Tannehill was not a slaveholder. He had religious convictions and was named one of 10 inaugural trustees of the First Presbyterian Church of Pittsburgh in 1787.

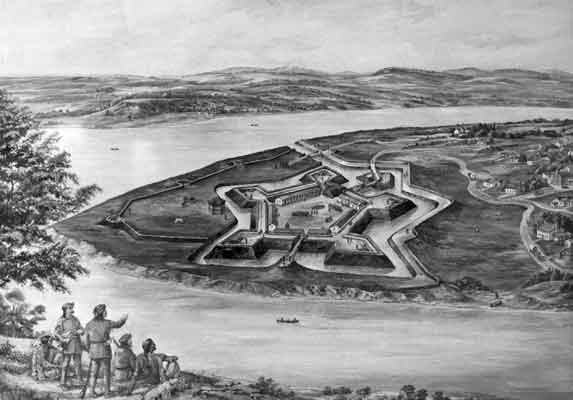
Depiction of Fort Pitt and early Pittsburgh at the confluence of the Allegheny and Monongahela rivers

From 1786 until 1792, Tannehill owned and operated the riverfront Green Tree Tavern and Inn located on Water Street (now Fort Pitt Boulevard) midblock between Market and Wood Streets in Pittsburgh. He resided in the adjacent house until 1787 when he moved to his new Grove Hill estate, which became popular as a local center for political meetings while owned by him. The property was located on Grant's Hill just northeast of Pittsburgh in what is now the city's Hill District. One of the outbuildings at Grove Hill, known as "the Bowery", was the site of large annual social gatherings hosted by Tannehill where citizens of Pittsburgh came together to commemorate each Fourth of July. Tannehill arranged a particularly well-attended celebration at Grove Hill soon after the War of 1812 started. Among the toasts offered was to "an unrelenting war with the haughty tyrant of the ocean, until he ceases to plunder our commerce, enslave our seamen and murder our defenc[e]less citizens on the frontiers". Tannehill lived at Grove Hill until his death in 1820.

== Early public career ==
=== Pennsylvania militia officer ===
Tannehill was active as an officer in the Pennsylvania state militia, serving as a lieutenant colonel in the Westmoreland County militia starting in 1788. In August 1811, Pennsylvania Governor Simon Snyder appointed Tannehill major general of a Pennsylvania militia division drawn from Allegheny, Armstrong, and Indiana counties.

=== Allegheny County commissioner ===
Tannehill began non-military public service in October 1789, when he was elected one of three commissioners of Allegheny County, an administrative unit established in September 1788 that included Pittsburgh. He held this position until mid-1791.

In March 1790, Tannehill unsuccessfully solicited a public appointment in the new administration of President George Washington by writing to Washington's personal secretary, Tobias Lear, who had visited Pittsburgh and lodged with Tannehill at his inn four years before. In his note, Tannehill mentioned that Washington "has some acquantance [sic] of me, which may probably have some weight", referring to instances of direct interaction the two men had during the American Revolution.

=== Pennsylvania House of Representatives ===
In June 1791, Tannehill was elected "by a large majority" a Democratic-Republican to the Pennsylvania House of Representatives of the state′s 15th General Assembly. He represented Allegheny County, which at that time included all of west-central and northwest Pennsylvania. Tannehill started his incumbency on August 25, when he was sworn in for the special session of the General Assembly′s 1790–91 term. He succeeded John Neville, a member of the opposing Federalist Party who had resigned in midterm. Governor Thomas Mifflin convened the special session in Philadelphia in part to "make appropriations for repelling [Indian] invaders committing depredations on the western frontiers of the State", an objective consistent with Tannehill′s military experience and the pressing security needs of Allegheny County. The General Assembly adjourned on September 30. Tannehill was succeeded by Federalist Thomas Morton for the 1791–92 term that began on December 6.

Tannehill and the other session representatives were particularly mindful that Indian raids in western Pennsylvania had become more frequent during the winter and spring of 1791. Newspaper accounts of travelers and citizens residing near Pittsburgh attested to the exceptional ruthlessness of those attacks. In late March, one observer recounted how "every inhabitant [...along the Allegheny River] has thought of nothing else than to escape from the cruelty of the savages, and with their families have universally abandoned their farms". In Pittsburgh itself, reaction to such reports was categorical. Tannehill and five other prominent men of the town submitted the following proposition to the area newspaper in mid-May: "We [...] promise to pay One Hundred Dollars, for every hostile Indian's scalp, with both ears [attached] to it, taken between this date and the 15th day of June next, by any inhabitant of Allegheny county".

=== Committee of the Pittsburgh residents ===
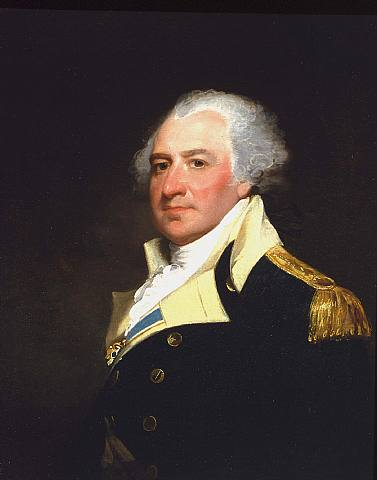
Thomas Mifflin, first governor of Pennsylvania (1790–1799)

Efforts by the Pennsylvania House of Representatives to mitigate the state′s Indian problem during its 1790–91 term appear to have been ineffectual. By late 1791, conditions were so fraught that Tannehill and a committee representing the Pittsburgh residents were compelled to petition Governor Thomas Mifflin for state support in the city′s defense. In mid-December, the committee informed him that because "the late disaster of the army [at St. Clair's defeat in western Ohio] must greatly affect the safety of [...Pittsburgh], there can be no doubt but the enemy will now come forward with more spirit and greater numbers". Tannehill and the committee further explained that "at present, we have neither garrison, arms, nor ammunition to defend the place", and "the enemy [...would] find it easy to destroy us". In late December, Mifflin notified the Pennsylvania General Assembly and President George Washington, who assured Mifflin of his "earnest desire" that all parts of the country′s frontiers be thoroughly protected "at the general expence [sic]".

At Washington′s request, Secretary of War Henry Knox proposed a plan of operation specifically for the defense of the Pennsylvania frontier. His plan was similar to that envisioned by Tannehill and the Pittsburgh committee. In early January 1792, Mifflin submitted the proposal to the General Assembly for its consideration, and within several days the Assembly ratified an act "to provide for the immediate defence of the frontiers of the Commonwealth [of Pennsylvania]". As a result, a militia unit comprising three companies of riflemen enlisted for six months was organized in early March. Detachments of this "ranger" corps, under the overall command of Pennsylvania Revolutionary War veteran Major George McCully, were quickly deployed to trouble spots around Pittsburgh. Despite these and other measures, it was not until 1794 with the U.S. Army victory at the Battle of Fallen Timbers in northern Ohio at the end of the 10-year-long Northwest Indian War did hostilities in western Pennsylvania and vicinity finally end.

=== Justice of the peace ===
In September 1791, Tannehill was appointed one of 10 justices of the peace of Allegheny County, a position he held for more than a decade. In October 1800, he was temporarily removed from this office after being convicted of extortion related to an event that occurred five years before in which he was alleged to have charged two shillings (25 cents in 1795) more than was allowed by law for two probate cases. He was also issued a reprimand and fined 50 dollars. Governor Thomas McKean, the former chief justice of Pennsylvania, quickly reinstated Tannehill to office in January 1801, remitted the charges against him, and refunded his fine.

Even though Tannehill subsequently held several prominent elected and appointed public offices, he believed the charges against him had marred his reputation and vehemently disclaimed any guilt for the rest of his life. An unattributed rebuttal of the charges, including a detailed summary of Tannehill′s military and work history almost certainly written by Adamson himself, was first published in a Pittsburgh periodical and then reprinted in a March 1801 issue of a prominent Lancaster newspaper. The article advances several factors that "justified the Governor in exercising his prerogative to moderate the rigour of Law, by remitting the Offence, and granting [Tannehill] a new Commission". Among these factors are the extended period of time between the alleged act of extortion and his indictment, the minimal sum he allegedly overcharged, and his honorable military service in war. Despite this public remonstration, Tannehill′s resentment toward whom he called "two of the most unprincipled scoundrels who ever appeared before a Court of Justice" and what he characterized as their "false swearing and vile slander" was still strong 14 years later when he reflected on the affair in his will.

=== Early Pittsburgh appointments ===
In early 1793, Tannehill was appointed by the Pennsylvania district judge of the United States district court one of three commissioners representing Pittsburgh to examine all evidence pertaining to "invalid pension" claims from widows and orphans of American soldiers of the Revolutionary War and from disabled veterans of the war. The commissioners of Pittsburgh (and 10 other Pennsylvania cities) were to report to the U.S. Secretary of War, providing these claims for final approval under an act ratified in March 1792 by the 2nd United States Congress.

When the borough of Pittsburgh was established by decree of the Pennsylvania General Assembly in April 1794, Tannehill was appointed president of the Pittsburgh Fire Company and elected one of three surveyors of the city.

=== The Whiskey Rebellion ===
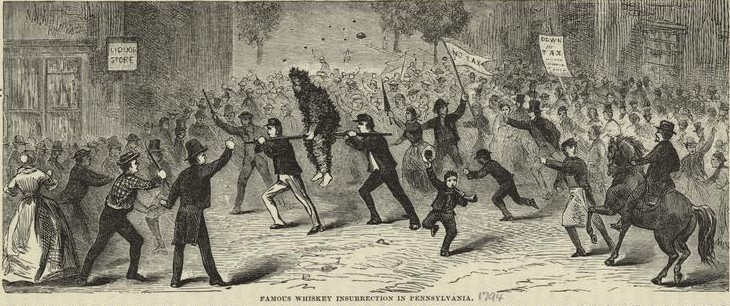
An 1880 depiction of a citizen being ousted from a western Pennsylvania town during the Whiskey Rebellion

Although Tannehill was a Pennsylvania militia officer, he was not involved in the military suppression of the Whiskey Rebellion, a major popular revolt against a liquor excise enacted in 1791 that primarily affected western Pennsylvania. Instead, he was engaged in his position as a justice of the peace, issuing warrants for the apprehension of some who had rebelled against the new tax law. Ironically, Tannehill, like most in the region, did not support this law. In July 1794, at a meeting of the inhabitants of Pittsburgh, the townsfolk decided that certain citizens who were "advocates of the excise law, and [thus] enemies of the interests of the country [...,] should be dismissed from the town without delay". A committee of 21 Pittsburgh men, including Tannehill, was appointed at that time to see that this resolution was implemented. However, only two months later at a town meeting chaired by Tannehill, it was unanimously resolved that those citizens had been unjustly exiled, and they should be notified that their "proscriptions are no longer regarded [as defensible] by the inhabitants of the town of Pittsburgh". Tannehill cryptically conceded that this affair had occurred because "necessity and policy led to a temporary acquiescence [to the banishment] on the part of the town".

With the cessation of hostilities related to the Whiskey Rebellion in late 1794, Tannehill was also tasked as a justice of the peace with requesting that all Allegheny County citizens "step forward in defence of the laws and the good order of the country" and take an oath of allegiance to the United States. Virginia Governor and General Henry Lee III, commander of all militia forces sent by President George Washington to quell the insurrection, had required a signed pledge of the citizens of Allegheny, Fayette, Washington, and Westmoreland counties to establish their loyalty before withdrawing his army from western Pennsylvania.

=== Auditor of Accounts for Allegheny County ===
Tannehill was appointed by the Allegheny County Court of Common Pleas one of two Auditors of Accounts for the county in 1797; he was reappointed in 1799. Many of his public and private endeavors, like this one, benefited from the administrative and recordkeeping experience he gained during his Continental Army service—as the orderly sergeant in Price's Independent Rifle Company in 1775, as acting lieutenant adjutant and brigade major while attached to Morgan′s Provisional Rifle Corps in 1777–1779, and as the unit paymaster, clothier, and commanding officer while with the Maryland and Virginia Rifle Regiment in 1779–1781.

== Later public career ==
=== Bank board member ===
Starting in 1804, Tannehill served as one of six founding members of the board of directors of the Pittsburgh branch of the Bank of Pennsylvania after leading Pittsburgh citizens in a petition to establish the branch. This was the first bank established in Pittsburgh and the first one west of the Allegheny Mountains.

Outside public office, Tannehill was a member of the fraternal Tammany Society, which was founded after the American Revolution in several American cities, including Pittsburgh. The society focused on the celebration of American identity and culture. Members of the society in its earliest years closely allied themselves with the Democratic-Republican party of Thomas Jefferson. Consequently, when Jefferson announced his intent to withdraw from public service in 1808, Tannehill, in his capacity as Grand Sachem (high official) of the Pittsburgh Tammany Society, wrote to "Brother" Jefferson, expressing "heartfelt regret" over his "resolution to retire from the duties of protecting thy children [of this tribe]".

=== Pennsylvania General Assembly appointments ===
In March 1810, the Pennsylvania General Assembly passed an act authorizing Governor Simon Snyder to incorporate a company for erecting a bridge across the Monongahela River at Pittsburgh. The General Assembly appointed Tannehill and eight other commissioners to oversee the company functions, particularly funding for construction of the bridge. The Monongahela Bridge (now the Smithfield Street Bridge) was the city′s first river bridge.

Tannehill was also appointed by the state General Assembly one of five turnpike commissioners for the state in April 1811. The commissioners' task was to "view the different routes [...] for making Turnpike Roads from Harrisburg to Pittsburg [sic]" and "report to the Governor, which of the Routes [...] shall be established". By October, the commissioners had delivered their recommendation to the governor.

The General Assembly further chose Tannehill as an elector in the 1808 and 1812 federal Electoral Colleges for the state of Pennsylvania. He was not able to attend the elector voting for U.S. president and vice president in early December 1812 in Harrisburg because of his War of 1812 military activities.

=== War of 1812 service ===
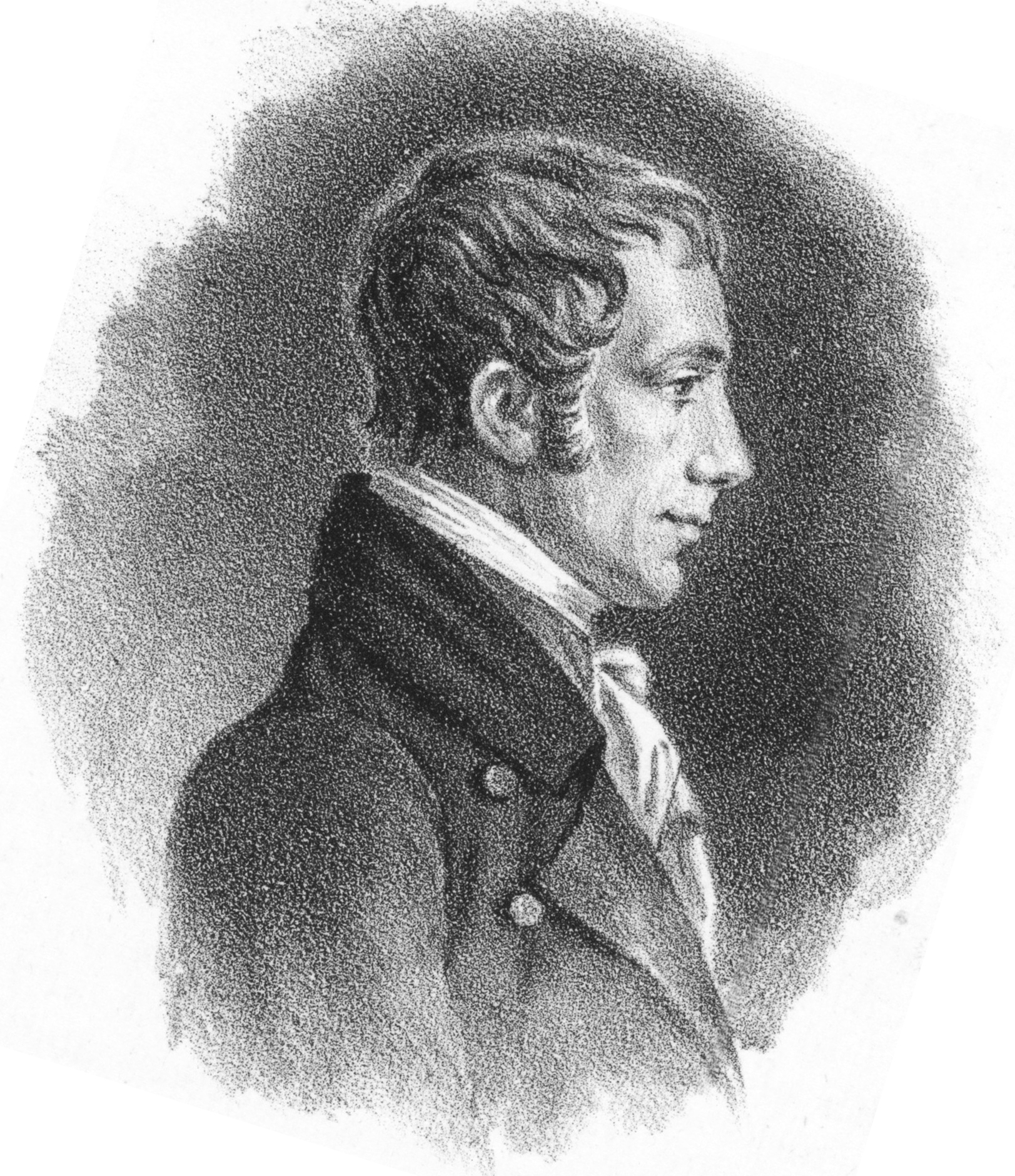
U.S. Army Brigadier General Alexander Smyth

During the War of 1812, Tannehill was elected by the soldiery to serve as brigadier general commanding two infantry and two rifle regiments of the First Brigade of Pennsylvania Volunteers. In November 1812, Tannehill and his 1,650-man unit marched 130 miles from the rendezvous location at Meadville, northwest Pennsylvania, to the American encampment at Buffalo, western New York. There, they joined the combined American forces (regular, volunteer, and militia) preparing to establish a foothold on the Canadian side of the Niagara River before the onset of winter. Tannehill′s brigade was the sole Pennsylvania unit organized for this task. The troops were under the overall command of U.S. Army Brigadier General Alexander Smyth. After several "hopelessly bungled" attempts by Smyth to execute a decisive river crossing with a sufficient force, the invasion of Canada was abandoned. The affair was highlighted by the British victory at the Battle of Frenchman's Creek on November 28.

The American troops were demoralized by Smyth′s repeated failures to cross the Niagara, leading to "great excitement and discontent" among the men. Except for Tannehill, his brigade staff, field officers, and "less than a single regiment", the Pennsylvania volunteers revolted and "deserted almost in a body and [...went] home in squads" shortly after December 1, when the last attempt at a crossing took place. In a letter to Smyth dated December 7 from Buffalo, Tannehill, who was recovering from illness at the time, wrote "my health is greatly restored, although [...my] officers, as well as the privates, are infected with [...a] dishonorable contagion—desertion". He further declared "I am at a loss how to express my feelings on the present state of our little army", adding "I await your special orders [on] how l am to act on the occasion generally". On December 8, Smyth responded, ordering Tannehill to organize the remaining enlisted men into a battalion commanded by one of the brigade’s major officers. He further granted furloughs to Tannehill, his brigade staff, and most of his field officers for the remainder of their prescribed time of service ending December 31, when they were honorably discharged. General Smyth expressed "his satisfaction with those [Pennsylvania] men who had continued [to be] faithful to the standard of their country" when he resigned his command in mid-December. Tannehill's military duties officially lasted from September 25 to December 31, 1812.

After more than a year, in February and March 1814, the accused deserters faced a court-martial in Pittsburgh and were tried for insubordination and desertion. All were convicted and each fined up to 60 dollars, a "much milder course" than expected.

=== U.S. House of Representatives ===
Although Pittsburgh was a stronghold of the Federalist Party in the city's earliest years, between 1798 and 1800 the rival Democratic-Republican Party began to prosper locally and nationally under such men as Adamson Tannehill, who had become chairman of the city's Republican party by 1800. Tannehill was also a three-time candidate for the U.S. House of Representatives, initially representing Pennsylvania's 11th congressional district in the election to the 12th United States Congress on October 9, 1810. He was defeated by fellow Democratic-Republican Abner Lacock, who garnered 51.0 percent of the vote; Tannehill earned 43.2 percent, and Democratic-Republican Samuel Smith received a distant 5.7 percent.

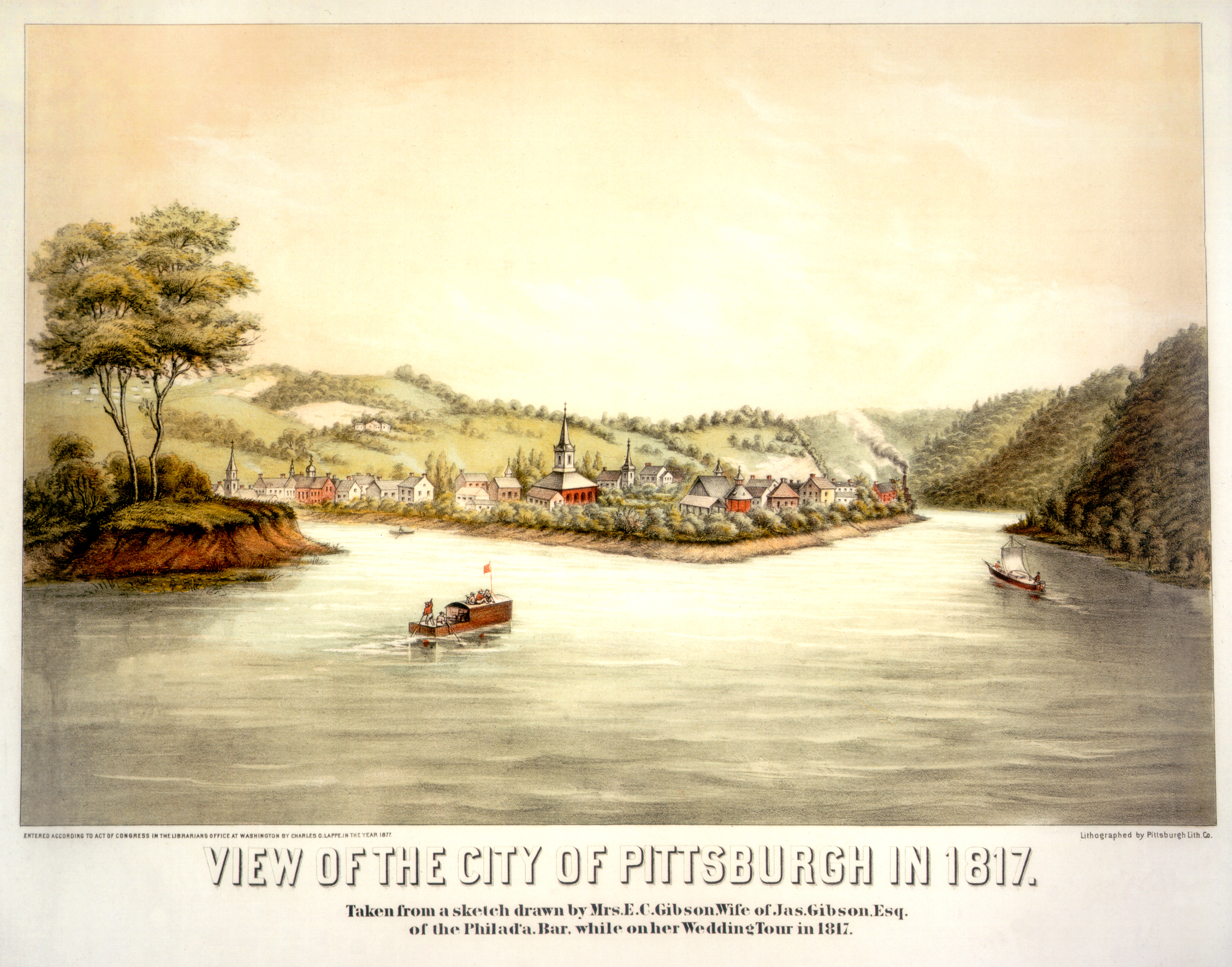
A view of Pittsburgh in 1817, showing Adamson Tannehill's estate, Grove Hill, on Grant's Hill upslope of city (left-center).

The high point of Tannehill's active political career was his election as a Democratic-Republican to the 13th United States Congress on October 13, 1812. He was elected to serve Pennsylvania's newly established 14th congressional district with 48 percent of the vote, defeating Federalist John Woods and Democratic-Republican John Wilson, who received 39.3 and 12.7 percent of the vote, respectively. Tannehill took office on March 4, 1813. Almost three months into his two-year term, he was appointed to the Committee of Military Establishment, a congressional select committee that "considered legislation on military affairs" and the precursor to the current House Armed Services Committee of the U.S. House of Representatives. Tannehill finished his term of office on March 3, 1815, after casting a total of 322 votes and missing 30.

Tannehill ran for reelection on October 11, 1814, again as a Democratic-Republican, in the 14th United States Congress. He narrowly lost his reelection bid, receiving 49.5 percent of the vote; his opponent, John Woods, whom he had defeated two years earlier, won with 50.5 percent of the vote.

After his congressional service, Tannehill was selected one of two commissioners in 1816 to oversee the sale of Pittsburgh city land lots at the site of Fort Fayette, property owned by the United States. He was appointed to the position by President James Madison in part because of his experience with land investing in the Pittsburgh area.

== Bank president ==
In 1817, Tannehill was elected president of the Pittsburgh branch of the Bank of the United States, which opened for business in January 1818. The initial years of the bank branch were remarkably successful under Tannehill′s charge. Despite the occurrence of the Panic of 1819, the first widespread financial crisis in the country, "the Bank of the United States regarded its Pittsburgh loans as among the best it carried" at that time. Tannehill′s term of service ended prematurely with his death in late 1820.

== Death ==
Tannehill died after a short illness at his Grove Hill home just outside Pittsburgh on December 23, 1820, aged 70 years and 7 months. He was survived by his wife, Agnes (or Agness) M. Tannehill, and his ward, Sydney Tannehill Mountain. Adamson and Agnes had no children. Tannehill was interred at his Grove Hill home, as specified in his will. His 1820 obituary relates "his remains were accompanied to the grave by a large concourse of his fellow citizens and were interred with military funeral honors by two [...] Volunteer Corps" of the Pittsburgh area.

Tannehill's body was reinterred in Allegheny Cemetery in Pittsburgh on April 26, 1849, because urban spread and city road construction necessitated moving his Grove Hill grave. The archive files of a prominent Pittsburgh newspaper provide detail on this reinternment: "after the big fire in 1845, when [the Pittsburgh city] council extended the city limits to take in the farms on what is now the Hill district [...,] it was found that in extending Wylie avenue, Colonel Adamson Tannehill's grave would be between the curbs [...;] about 1851 [sic] [the] council decided to remove the colonel's remains to Allegheny cemetery. The Tannehill family objected, but [then] agreed to make the transfer themselves".

== Notes ==
U.S. House of Representatives
Preceded by District newly created	Member of the U.S. House of Representatives from Pennsylvania's 14th congressional district March 4, 1813 – March 3, 1815	Succeeded by John Woods
