= Otho Holland Williams =

Continental Army officer (1749–1794)

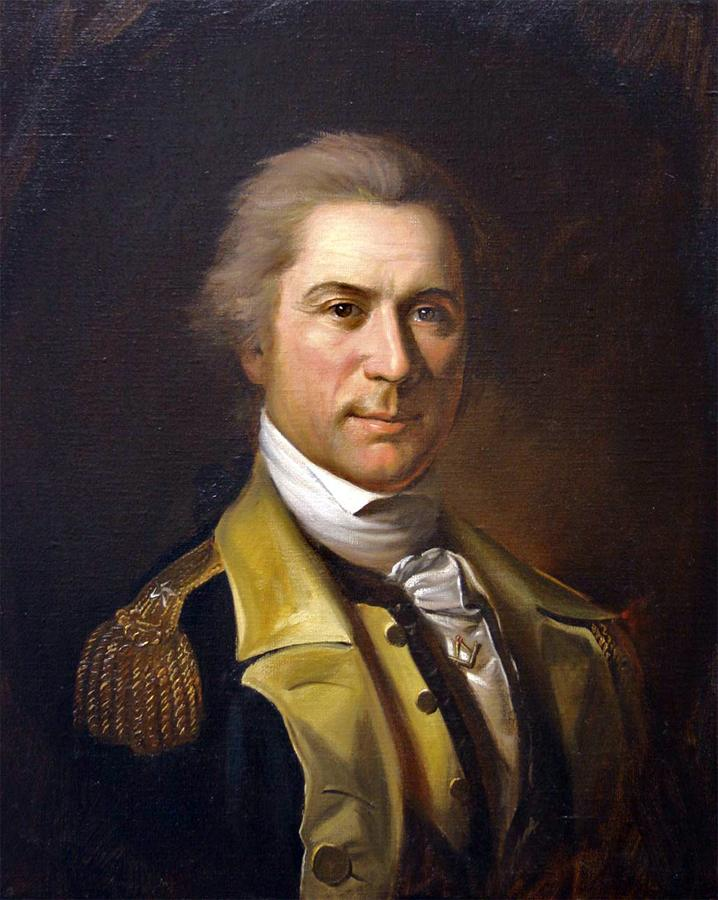
- Portrait by Charles Willson Peale, 1784
- Born: March 1, 1749; Prince George's County, Maryland, British America
- Died: July 15, 1794 (aged 46); Woodstock, Virginia, U.S.
- Military career
- Allegiance: United States
- Branch: Continental Army
- Rank: Brigadier general
- Units: Capt. Thomas Price's Independent Rifle Company of Maryland; Maryland and Virginia Rifle Regiment; 6th Maryland Regiment
- Commands: Capt. Thomas Price's Independent Rifle Company of Maryland; 6th Maryland Regiment
- Conflicts: American Revolutionary War; Siege of Boston; Battle of Fort Washington; Battle of Monmouth; Battle of Camden; Battle of Guilford Court House; Battle of Hobkirk's Hill; Battle of Eutaw Springs; Battle of Cowpens
- Other work: 1st Commissioner of the Port of Baltimore

Brigadier General Otho Holland Williams (March 1, 1749 – July 15, 1794) was a Continental Army officer from Maryland in the American Revolutionary War. He participated in many battles throughout the war in the New York, New Jersey and Southern theaters, eventually ending his career as a brigadier general.

Born in rural Prince George's County, Province of Maryland, Williams spent his childhood on Springfield Farm near present-day Williamsport. He was orphaned at age thirteen and was put in the care of his father's brother-in-law, Mr. Ross. Williams took an apprenticeship under Mr. Ross and studied his profession in the Clerk's office of Frederick, eventually taking charge of the office. At age eighteen, Williams moved to Baltimore and undertook a similar trade. Williams returned to Frederick in 1774 and entered into a commercial life.

In response to Congress's call for soldiers at the outbreak of the American Revolutionary War in the spring of 1775, Williams joined a Continental Army rifle unit as a commissioned officer. Soon thereafter, he and his unit marched off to the Siege of Boston. Seeing his first significant combat action in late 1776 at the Battle of Fort Washington, Williams was captured by the British and imprisoned in New York. He was released in early 1778 and returned to the Continental Army as colonel of the 6th Maryland Regiment, a position he had acquired during his captivity. From thereafter, Williams led his regiment through much of the southern campaign, most notably in the battles of Camden, Guilford Court House, and Eutaw Springs. Near the end of the War, Williams was sent by his commanding officer General Greene with documents to Congress and was promoted to brigadier general in 1782.

After the war, Williams later served as an associate justice for Baltimore County, and as the first commissioner of the Port of Baltimore. He returned to Springfield Farm in 1787, bought the house and the surrounding land, and began laying out the town of Williamsport. In 1792, Washington offered Williams to be brigadier general of the army, though he declined due to his failing health. Williams died two years later in 1794 while travelling to Sweet Springs, Virginia.

== Early life ==
Otho Holland Williams was born on March 1, 1749, the first son and third generation of his family born on the North American continent, his ancestors having emigrated from Wales. His parents, Joseph and Prudence Williams, were tenant farmers and also ran a tavern near Seneca Creek in what in this man's lifetime would become Montgomery County, but which had just become Frederick County during an early division of then-vast Prince George's County. His parents had probably married in St. Barnabas Church. His only brother, Elie (or Elisha) Williams, was born a year later and always associated with Frederick or Montgomery Counties, including serving in the American Revolutionary War. The family also included eight daughters, of whom at least four married. While Otho Holland Williams was a youth, his family moved upstream on the Potomac River with the family of his uncle Basil Lee Williams. They settled at the mouth of the Conecocheague near present-day Williamsport (in what was then vast Frederick County and became Washington County).

His paternal grandfather John Williams (1685-1728) had settled in Queen Anne Parish in Prince George's County after marrying Lucy Harding. His maternal grandfather, Otho Holland Jr. (1692-1731) had settled in Londontowne in Anne Arundel County after marrying Mary Margaret Selby of All Hallow's Parish. Shortly before Joseph Williams died, he placed his thirteen-year-old son into the care of his brother-in-law Mr. Ross, who worked in the Frederick County clerk's office. After studying the duties of the office, Williams took charge of the office himself before moving to Baltimore for similar employment at the age of eighteen.

In the spring of 1774, Williams returned to Frederick, the Frederick County seat and entered into commercial life.

== Early war ==
On June 14, 1775, not long after the Continental Congress called for soldiers, Williams joined Capt. Thomas Price's Independent Rifle Company of Maryland as first lieutenant. The company then marched to the Siege of Boston. Soon after the company arrived in Boston, Williams was promoted. By order of the Continental Congress on June 27, 1776, the rifle company was integrated into the Maryland and Virginia Rifle Regiment, with Hugh Stephenson as colonel, Moses Rawlings as lieutenant colonel and Williams as major.

The regiment did not see much action until the Battle of Fort Washington, where Williams was wounded and taken prisoner by the British. Taken to New York, due to his rank he initially was permitted to go at large on his parole and mingle in polite society with the British officer corps in the fashionable Battery Heights neighborhood. During this time in New York, British officers commonly amused themselves by insulting American prisoners with pointed questions such as "What Trade were you of before you entered the service?" When a high ranking British officer asked this question of Williams he replied:

That he was in a profession which taught him to resist tyranny and punish insolence, and that proofs of his profession would follow a reputation towards him.

It is suggested that the officer offended by this retort informed William Phillips—then in command of the New York garrison—that Williams was sending military information to George Washington contrary to the terms of his parole. Williams was promptly arrested and sent to Provost prison in Manhattan. He and many others including Ethan Allen were confined to a filthy sixteen square foot (1.5 square meter) room without ventilation in the city's jail. At least once Williams was made to ride toward the gallows with a rope around his next and seated on a coffin before being sent back to the prison. Nonetheless, his spirit remained unbroken, for when his brother managed to get $40 to him, Williams loaned $30 to fellow inmates to buy shirts and shoes. He remained captive for about fourteen months. In late September 1777, Allen, together with Williams, Virginia Navy Captain Edward Champion Travis, New Jersey diarist William Fell and Long Island surgeon's mate Elias Cornelius wrote a letter delivered to New York's city commandant, Major General Pigot complaining of the close confinement, inadequate rations, insufficient firewood, bad water, no medicine nor ink and paper nor family visits and confinement in the "loathsome dungeon" which received no written reply though the doors were all bolted for a day or two in retaliation.

Following General John Burgoyne's surrender after the Battles of Saratoga, Williams was exchanged for British prisoners on January 16, 1778. During his imprisonment, Williams had been promoted to colonel and given command of the 6th Maryland Regiment of the Maryland Line. However, Williams would never fully recover from the malnourishment and maltreatment in that prison and that may have been the exposure to tuberculosis which ultimately killed him decades later. Meanwhile, shortly after his release, Williams took command of the underperforming regiment and soon wrote governor of Maryland that the regiment contained "...not above a hundred effective men... and that those are very indifferently clothed." He further stated: "I heartily desire to join the army as soon as possible but certainly it had better be reinforced by a regiment without a colonel than by a colonel without a regiment." After joining Washington's army shortly before the Battle of Monmouth, Wiliams learned that the regiment was noted for loose discipline and inability to stand with others in the line during battle. Soon after he took effective command, the 6th Maryland Regiment became known as the equal, if not superior, to any in the whole army.

== Southern campaign ==
After the unsuccessful attempt to capture Savannah, Georgia, under the command of General Benjamin Lincoln, the Southern Department of the Continental Army retreated to Charleston, South Carolina. General Sir Henry Clinton moved his forces, surrounded the city where Lincoln's army was located and cut off any chance of relief for the Continental Army. Prior to his surrender, Lincoln had been able to get messages to General Washington and Congress requesting aid. At the end of April 1780, Washington dispatched General Johann de Kalb with 1,400 Maryland and Delaware troops. The Maryland Line made up a large portion of this force, with Williams serving in the post of Adjutant general to General De Kalb.

General de Kalb's forces took almost a month to descend the Chesapeake Bay and did not arrive in Petersburg, Virginia, until the middle of June, almost a month after Lincoln had surrendered his army. The Continental Congress appointed Horatio Gates to command the Southern Department. He assumed command on July 25, 1780, and immediately marched into South Carolina with the intent of engaging the British Army, now under the command of Charles Cornwallis. Williams served as Deputy Adjutant-General under Gates.

=== Battle of Camden ===
After brief aggressive maneuvering which threatened the British position in the Carolinas, Cornwallis moved his forces to engage the American forces. The two armies met in the Battle of Camden on August 16, 1780, six miles (9.5 km) north of Camden, South Carolina. Due to several tactical errors on the part of General Gates, Cornwallis achieved a decisive victory. Deserted by their commander and facing opposition on all sides, the Continental Army was forced to retreat. During this engagement, Williams had been stationed to the rear of the army and was unable to contribute until the end and General de Kalb was mortally wounded. Prior to his death three days later, de Kalb paid a glowing tribute to the Maryland Troop under his command.

=== Battle of Guilford Court House ===
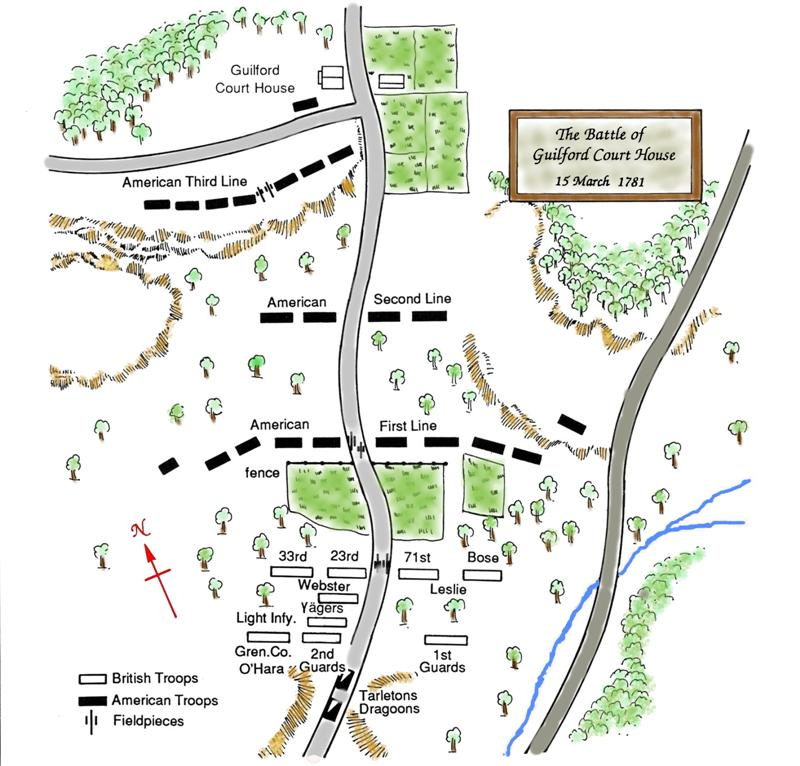
Battle of Guilford Court House

After the successful retreat across the Dan River, during which Williams led his men during many highly successful rear guard actions checking the enemy's advance and baffling every British attempt to bring the American army into a general engagement, General Nathanael Greene chose to offer battle to General Cornwallis's forces on March 15, 1781, on ground of his own choosing at Guilford Court House, inside the city limits of present-day Greensboro, North Carolina.

After the British forces had broken Greene's first line made up of North Carolina Militia and the second line made up of Virginia Militia they threatened the third line made up by the 1st Maryland Regiment, under the command of Colonel John Gunby, and the 2nd Maryland Regiment. The Brigade of Guards, under the command of a Colonel Stewart, broke through the 2nd Maryland Regiment, captured two field pieces and threatened the rear of the 1st Maryland forces whom were already engaged with sizable force under the command of a Colonel Webster.

The 1st Maryland Regiment charged and swept Webster's forces from the field. They then turned to face the oncoming guards unit. After a brief exchange of musket fire, in which 1st Maryland's commander's horse was shot from under him, the 1st Maryland Regiment charged the Guards unit who were quickly routed.

Greene, not able to see this part of the battle from his vantage point, had already ordered a retreat. Thus, unsupported, the Maryland troops were soon forced to withdraw. During this retreat the 6th Maryland Regiment under Williams again acted as the rear guard of the army and is credited with holding off the British forces allowing Greene to move his forces to safety. In recognition of Williams' gallantry, Greene appointed him to the post of Adjutant general of the Army.

=== Battle of Eutaw Springs ===
The Battle of Eutaw Springs can be divided into two distinct engagements. During the first action, Greene had given the following order to Williams:

Let Williams advance and sweep the field with his bayonets."

The 6th Maryland Regiment advanced and broke the British line forcing them to fall back several miles and allowing the Continental Army to gain control of the British Camp. The Americans then began to pillage the camp which allowed time for the British to form a new line anchored by a stone house that the Continental Army was unable to move later in the day.

Near the close of the War, he was sent by General Greene with dispatches to congress and on May 9, 1782, promoted to brigadier general.

== Later life ==
Coat of Arms of Otho Holland Williams

After the War, Williams returned to Maryland and settled in Baltimore. He soon received a prized (and potentially lucrative) appointment as commissioner of the port by the governor of Maryland, and when George Washington assumed the Presidency of the United States, that appointment was confirmed. Williams also became one of the original members of The Society of the Cincinnati of Maryland in November 1783, and the following year became the first assistant secretary general of the National Society at its first general meeting. In 1790, Williams sat for a portrait by celebrated Maryland artist Charles Willson Peale, which today remains on display at the Society's headquarters in Washington, D.C.. In that same year Williams also sat for a portrait by John Trumbull, which was later sold to a purchaser in Baltimore, who decades later lent it to Yale University, which enabled George Flagg to copy it. Trumbull also included Williams in his famous painting of George Washington's resignation, and the Trumbull/Flagg portrait is displayed at Yale's Art Gallery.

Meanwhile, in 1787, Williams bought his father's house on the upper Potomac River and dedicated himself to improving the farm, as well as laid out the town of Williamsport, Maryland, which was named in his honor. On November 1, 1790 Williams wrote a letter to Washington, enclosing a map of the town and suggested it become the new capital of the United States. Williams also invested in real estate in what remained Frederick County, buying parcels on either side of Walkersville, Maryland.

Washington thought so highly of Williams that in 1792, when Daniel Morgan refused the rank of brigadier general of the American Army, the president had Henry Knox, the United States Secretary of War, write Williams asking him to accept the position. That would have made Williams second in command of the American Army, but citing poor health and no ambition for the position, Williams declined the appointment. Nonetheless, on December 21, 1792, Williams accepted the Maryland State Legislature's invitation for him to serve as an associate justice for Baltimore County.

== Personal life ==
During and after the conflict, Williams had courted several women, including of the Maryland gentry, but his humble antecedents and lack of personal fortune proved impediments. In 1786 he married Mary ("Polly") Smith (1763-1795), the second daughter of prominent Baltimore merchant and patriot (and future Congressman) William Smith. The couple would have seven sons, most born or christened in Baltimore, as well as raised their by their mother's family after becoming orphans. Three never married: their first children, Robert Smith Williams and Bazeel Williams having died as boys and the youngest surviving brother, Otho Holland Williams Jr. (May 15, 1784 – 1818) who was born in Baltimore also never married. William Otho Williams (1788-1866) moved to Louisiana and would prove the longest lived of that generation, surviving decades longer (including the American Civil War) than the eldest child to survive their parents, William Elie Williams (1787-1822 or 1833) who would live in Washington County and died in Frederick, Maryland. Edward Greene Williams (1789-1829) married Ann Gilmore and remained in Williamsport, and their daughter Mary (1822-1907) would marry John Campbell White and not only discuss her grandfather with biographers, but named a son after him. Another middle brother, Henry Lee Williams (1791-1826) remained in Baltimore, married and had children. A grandson, Otho Holland Williams III would eventually inherit the family farm in Williamsport, and operate it using enslaved labor.

== Death and legacy ==
His health deteriorating, Williams was induced to try the "sea airs" and in 1793 journeyed to Barbados which afforded him some benefit. The following summer he began traveling down the Shenandoah Valley toward Sweet Springs, Virginia, but upon reaching Woodstock became too ill to continue. On Tuesday, July 15, 1794, at the age of 46, Otho Holland Williams died. His remains were returned to Maryland and interred under a simple monument on the summit of a hill on his Williamsport homestead. His wife died one year later, leaving their children orphaned but raised by her father.

His brother Elie's daughter Sophia would marry prominent lawyer and future judge John Buchanan. The family home in Williamsport, Springfield Farm, where Otho sometimes lived after his wartime service, was listed on the National Register of Historic Places in 1974.

A copy of Williams portrait by Charles Willson Peale (this by Peter Egeli) hangs in the Maryland Senate Committee Room. The family's papers would be donated to the Maryland Historical Society, which also displays a portrait of Williams by Rembrandt Peale. The calendar of them prepared under the auspices of the Works Progress Administration published in 1940.

Williams appears in John Trumbull's 1824 painting General George Washington Resigning His Commission, which was featured on the reverse of the United States five-thousand-dollar bill.
