= Bullskin =

Bullskin can refer to:

- Bullskin Township, Fayette County, Pennsylvania
- Beverley (West Virginia), a historic property also known as "Bullskin"
