= Springfield Farm =

Springfield Farm may refer to:

- Springfield Farm (Williamsport, Maryland), listed on the National Register of Historic Places in Maryland
- Springfield Farm (Ellensburg, Washington), listed on the National Register of Historic Places in Kittitas County, Washington
