= Springfield Farm (Williamsport, Maryland) =

Historic house in Maryland, United States

- U.S. National Register of Historic Places
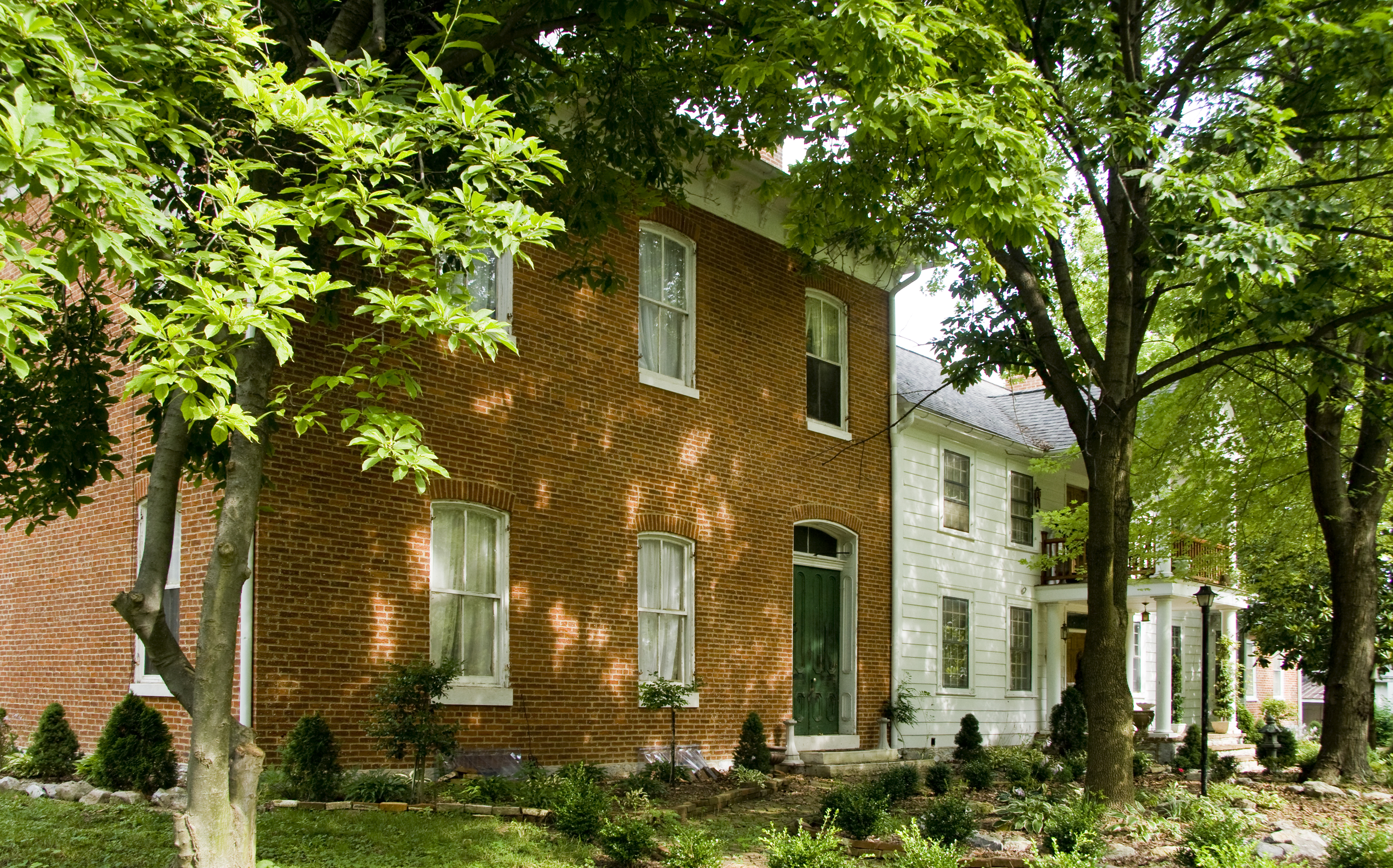

- Location within Maryland Location within the United States
- Location: S of U.S. 11, Williamsport, Maryland
- Coordinates: 39°35′48″N 77°48′57″W
- Area: 5 acres (2.0 ha)
- Built: 1750
- NRHP reference No.: 74000977
- Added to NRHP: July 30, 1974

Springfield Farm is a historic home and farm located at Williamsport, Washington County, Maryland, United States. It was built in three distinct parts, with the center, or original section, dating from the second half of the 18th century. This two-story plus attic beaded clapboard house is five bays wide with an entrance in the center bay of both the first and second stories on the east façade. The property includes a springhouse and stillhouse both of rough fieldstone, and several smaller buildings. It was a home of Revolutionary War General Otho Holland Williams (1749-1794).

It was listed on the National Register of Historic Places in 1974.

The farm's barn was purchased by the Town of Williamsport, which now operates the Williamsport Town Museum in the former milk parlor.
