= Moses Rawlings =

Continental Army officer (1745–1809)

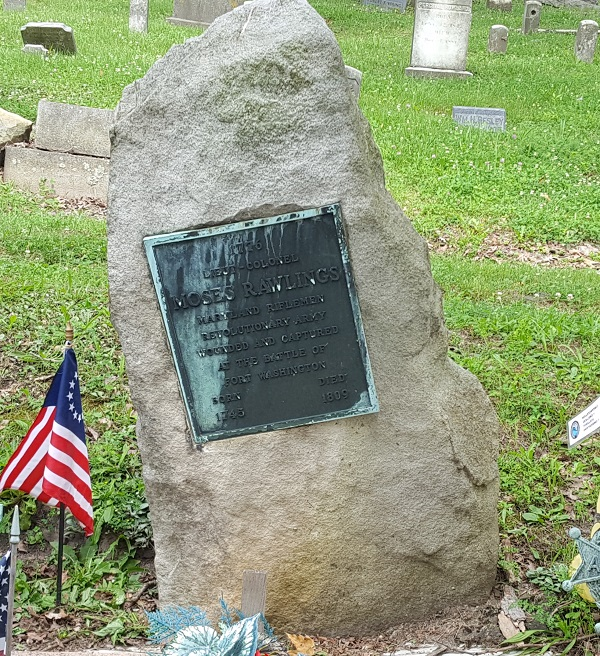
- Born: 1745; Anne Arundel County, Maryland
- Died: 1809 (aged 63–64); Hampshire County, Virginia (now West Virginia)
- Burial place: Rose Hill Cemetery, Cumberland, Maryland
- Military career
- Allegiance: United States
- Branch: Continental Army
- Service years: 1775-1779
- Rank: Lieutenant Colonel
- Commands: Maryland and Virginia Rifle Regiment
- Conflicts: American Revolutionary War: Battle of Fort Washington
- Other work: State Commissioner of Prisoners in Frederick Town, MD

Moses Rawlings (1745–1809) served in the Continental Army during the American Revolutionary War, most notably at the Battle of Fort Washington. He attained the rank of lieutenant colonel before leaving the military in 1779. He later served as the State Commissioner for Prisoners in Maryland.

== American Revolutionary War ==
Rawlings was appointed as first lieutenant in Capt. Michael Cresap's Independent Rifle Company from Frederick County, Maryland. Shortly afterward Cresap died, and Rawlings replaced him as company commander. On June 17, 1776, the company was joined to the newly formed Maryland and Virginia Rifle Regiment and Rawlings was named second-in-command and promoted to the rank of lieutenant colonel. When the regimental commander, Col. Hugh Stephenson, died in August 1776, Rawlings took command of the regiment. The unit consisted of approximately 250 riflemen, and was often referred to as "Rawlings' Regiment".

During the Battle of Fort Washington, the Maryland and Virginia Rifle Regiment was positioned about a half mile north of Fort Washington on Manhattan Island. From November 2 to November 14, 1776, they defended against German Hessian mercenaries, but on November 16 they were finally pushed back to Fort Washington, which surrendered a short time after. Rawlings was taken prisoner. General Washington had also requested that Rawlings be released as part of a prisoner exchange.

Throughout the remainder of his military career, Rawlings often wrote to Washington concerning pay for his soldiers and recruits, as he had difficulty paying his soldiers. Washington's response often included requests that Rawlings use his own money to pay his soldiers until more money could be obtained from Congress.

At the conclusion of the war, Rawlings was admitted as an original member of The Society of the Cincinnati of Maryland.

== Post-War ==
Rawlings was a delegate to the Maryland State Convention of 1788, to vote whether Maryland should ratify the proposed Constitution of the United States.

In 1779, Rawlings became the State Commissioner of Prisoners out of Frederick Town, Maryland.

== Family ==
Rawlings was married to Elizabeth McMahon. He also had a son named Moses Rawlings.
