= Beverley (West Virginia) =

Historic house in West Virginia, United States

- U.S. National Register of Historic Places
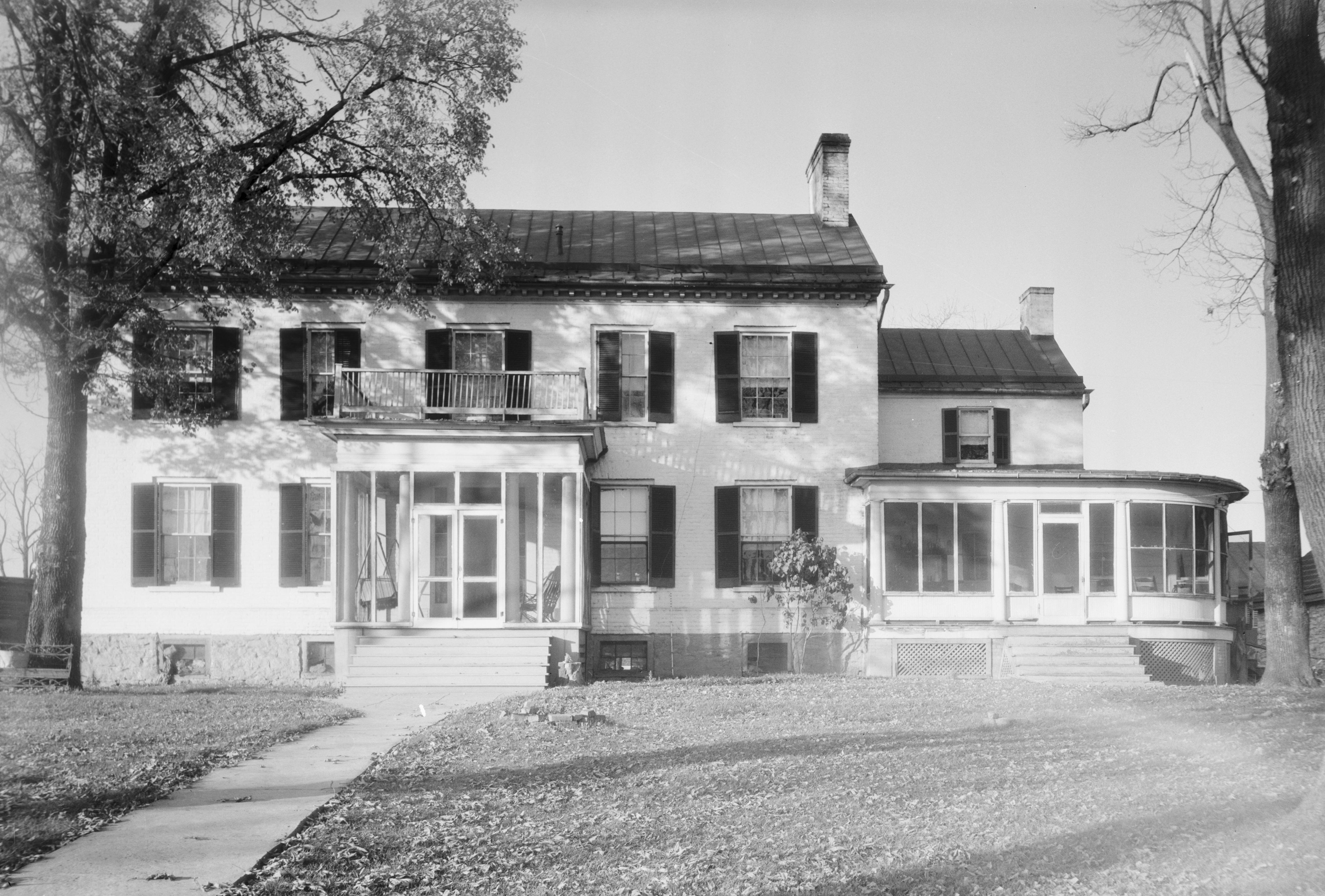
- Front of Beverley

- Location within West Virginia Location within the United States
- Location: Jefferson County, West Virginia, USA
- Nearest city: Charles Town, West Virginia
- Coordinates: 39°15′3″N 77°53′34″W
- Area: 4 acres (1.6 ha)
- Built: 1760
- Architectural style: Federal
- NRHP reference No.: 87000486
- Added to NRHP: March 20, 1987

Beverley, also known as Bullskin, is a farm near Charles Town, West Virginia that has been a working agricultural unit since 1750. The narrow lane that leads from U.S. Route 340 to the Beverley complex was, in the 18th and 19th centuries a toll road. The main house was built about 1800 by Beverley Whiting on the site of a c. 1760 stone house. The house is Georgian influenced Federal style, with a later Greek Revival portico. A number of outbuildings dating to the original 1760 house accompany the main house.

== History ==
The original land was purchased from Thomas Fairfax, 6th Lord Fairfax of Cameron in 1750 by Richard Stephenson. During the course of the next decade, Stephenson constructed a stone residence, two stone outbuildings, and other farm-related structures and put into operation the farming business that still operates here today. It is not known exactly when the two extant stone structures were constructed, but they were certainly standing by 1760. The surviving outbuildings are among the oldest buildings in West Virginia. The west outbuilding served as a school for a time during the late 19th and early 20th centuries. The east outbuilding was used as a kitchen. Due to their age, these stone outbuildings are individually listed as Jefferson County Historic Landmarks.

Richard Stephenson was the father of seven children, two of whom rose to prominence in the Revolutionary War. Colonel John Stephenson served with noted distinction, but it was his brother, Colonel Hugh Stephenson who is better remembered. He had served previously in the French and Indian Wars and in Lord Dunmore's War. In 1775, he was recommended by George Washington to command one of the two Virginia rifle companies. Colonel Hugh Stephenson led the famous Bee Line March that left from Morgan Springs (near Shepherdstown) on July 16, 1775, and marched to Cambridge, Massachusetts to join the Continental Army, covering 600 miles in 24 days. Colonel Stephenson's half-brother, Colonel William Crawford, who also lived at what is now known as Beverley for a time, was also a noted Revolutionary soldier who was burned at the stake by Indians in 1782. George Washington was friends with Richard Stephenson and notes in his journal that he stayed at Bullskin with Richard during a visit to his own property in the area in May 1760. George Washington performed the survey of the property for Richard Stephenson around 1750 which still survives to this day and is publicly displayed in the Boston Public Library.

The property passed by purchase from the Stephenson family to Dr. John Bull in 1777, and then to Beverley Whiting, in 1795. Beverley Whiting was a leading planter and man of affairs in post-Revolutionary Berkeley and Jefferson Counties, as evidenced by the fact that he served on the first grand jury empaneled in the newly formed Jefferson County, being sworn in on March 9, 1802. Around 1845 the name of the property was changed from "Bullskin" to "Beverley". Around 1870 the property was sold to John Burns, and the property has remained in the Burns family ever since.

== Description ==
Beverley has a double-pile center hall plan. The two-story brick house is set on a raised stone basement. It was altered in the nineteenth century and expanded.

== See also ==
- Ripon Lodge
