= Battle of Fort Washington =

Battle of the American Revolutionary War

- Part of the American Revolutionary War
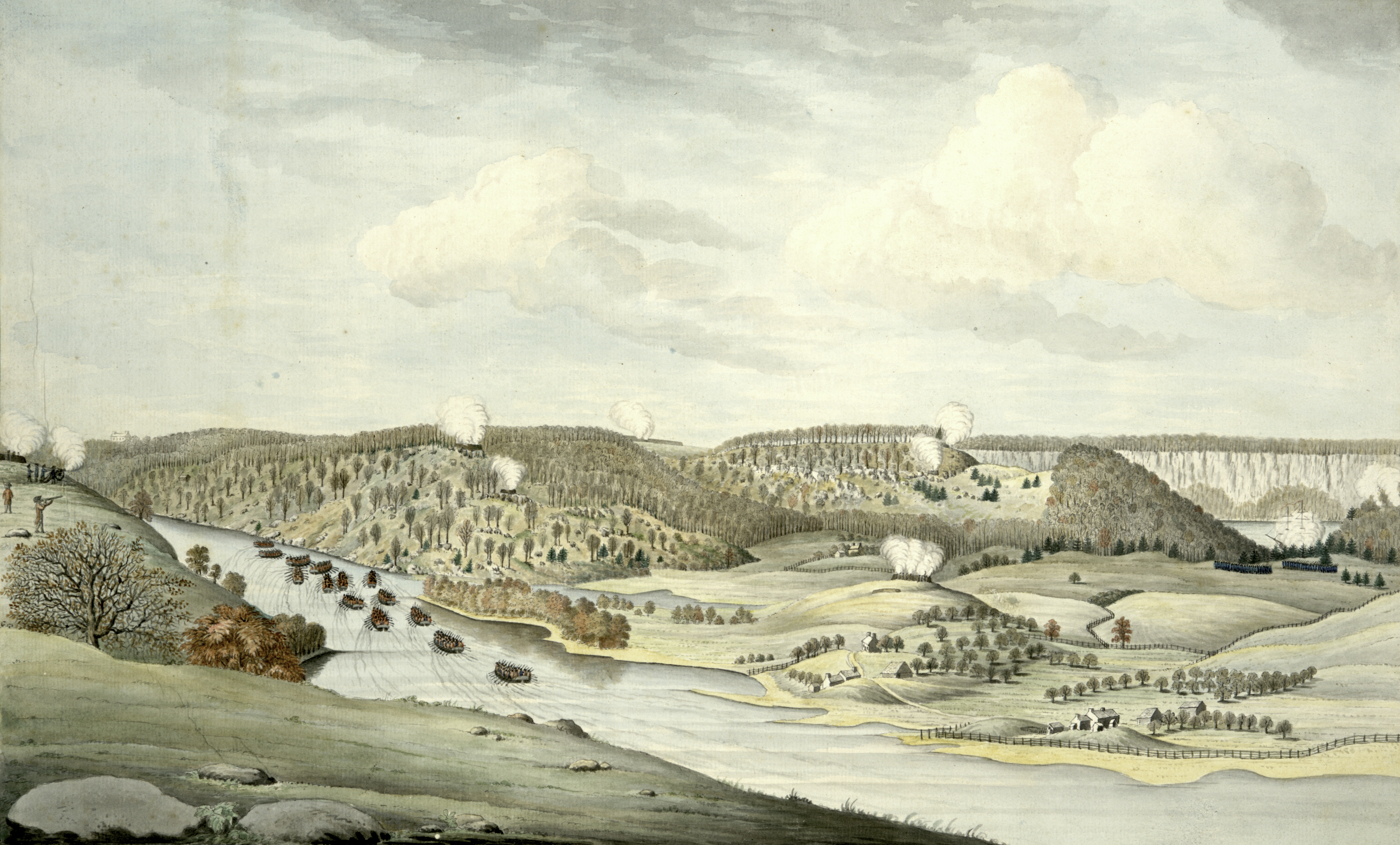
- A View of the Attack Against Fort Washington; Thomas Davies, 1776
Date	November 16, 1776
Location	Washington Heights, New York 40°51′10″N 73°56′17″W
Result	British victory

Belligerents
Great Britain; Hesse-Kassel; Waldeck and Pyrmont	United States

Commanders and leaders
William Howe; Hugh Percy; Wilhelm Knyphausen	Robert Magaw (surrendered); George Washington; Nathanael Greene

Strength
8,000	3,000

Casualties and losses
84 killed 374 wounded	59 killed 96 wounded 2,837 captured

The Battle of Fort Washington was fought in New York on November 16, 1776, during the American Revolutionary War between the United States and Great Britain. It was a British victory that gained the surrender of the remnant of the garrison of Fort Washington near the north end of Manhattan. It was one of the worst Patriot defeats of the war.

After defeating the Continental Army under Commander-in-Chief General George Washington at the Battle of White Plains, the British forces under the command of Lieutenant General William Howe planned to capture Fort Washington, the last American stronghold on Manhattan. General Washington issued a discretionary order to General Nathanael Greene to abandon the fort and remove its garrison, which then numbered 1,200 men but which later grew to 3,000, to New Jersey. Colonel Robert Magaw, acting commander of the fort, refused to abandon it, believing his troops would be able to defend it from the British. Howe's forces attacked the fort before Washington could arrive to assess the situation on November 16.

Howe led an assault from three sides: the north, east and south. The tides of the Harlem River prevented some troops from landing and delayed the attack. When the British moved against the defenses, the southern and eastern American defenses fell quickly, and the obstacles meant to deter an attack were bypassed with ease. Patriot forces on the north side offered stiff resistance to the Hessian attack, but they too were overwhelmed. With the fort surrounded by land and sea, Colonel Magaw chose to surrender. A total of 59 Americans were killed in action and 2,837 were taken as prisoners of war.

After this defeat, a large portion of Washington's army was pursued across New Jersey and into Pennsylvania, while the British consolidated their control of New York Harbor and eastern New Jersey.

== Background ==
=== Construction and defenses ===
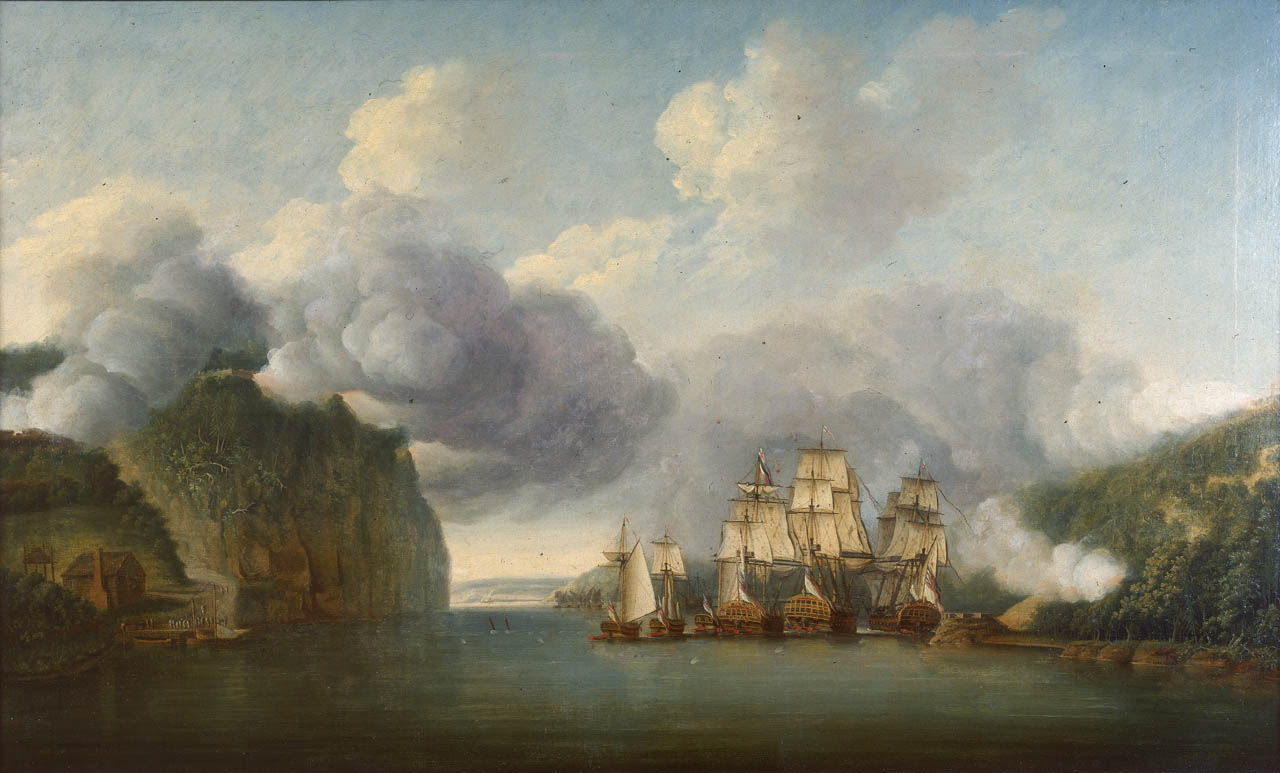
British warships trying to pass between Forts Washington and Lee

During the American Revolutionary War, Fort Washington was located at the highest point of the island of Manhattan, along a large outcropping of Manhattan schist near its northernmost tip. Along with Fort Lee, located just across the Hudson River atop the New Jersey Palisades, the twin forts were intended to protect the lower Hudson from British warships.

In June 1776, American Patriot officers Henry Knox, Nathanael Greene, William Heath, and Israel Putnam examined the terrain on which Fort Washington would be located; they agreed that if the fort was properly fortified, it would be practically impossible to take. Later in June, the Commander-in-Chief of the Continental Army, George Washington, inspected the location and determined that the area was the key to defense of the lower Hudson. Shortly after Washington's survey, troops from Pennsylvania began construction on the fort under the supervision of Rufus Putnam.

They first prepared a cheval de frise to prevent British ships from sailing up the Hudson and outflanking the U.S. position. For more than a month, the troops transported boulders from the heights of Manhattan to the edge of the river, where they loaded them into a collection of hulks and cribs made of timber and stretched it across the river. When the cheval de frise was finished, they began work on the fort. Little soil covered the rocky surface, so men had to haul soil up from the low ground. They were unable to dig the customary ditches or trenches around the fort. The fort was built in the shape of a pentagon with five bastions. The main walls were made of earth, constructed with ravelins with openings for guns from every angle. The fort enclosed a total of three to four acres. The troops built an abatis around the fort. After the barracks were finished in September, all the troops in the area were placed under the command of Major General William Heath. Washington established his headquarters near the fort.

Supporting the fort were numerous defenses. Batteries were placed on Jeffrey's Hook, which extended into the Hudson; on Cox's Hill looking over Spuyten Duyvil Creek; at the north end of Manhattan controlling the King's Bridge and Dyckman's Bridge over the Harlem River; and along Laurel Hill, located to the east of the Fort and along the Harlem River (see also Fort Tryon Park). To the south of the fort were three lines of defense made up of trenches and foxholes. The first line was supported by a second line about 0.33 mi (0.5 km) to the north, with a third line planned to be built 0.25 mi (0.4 km) north of the second.

=== Movements ===
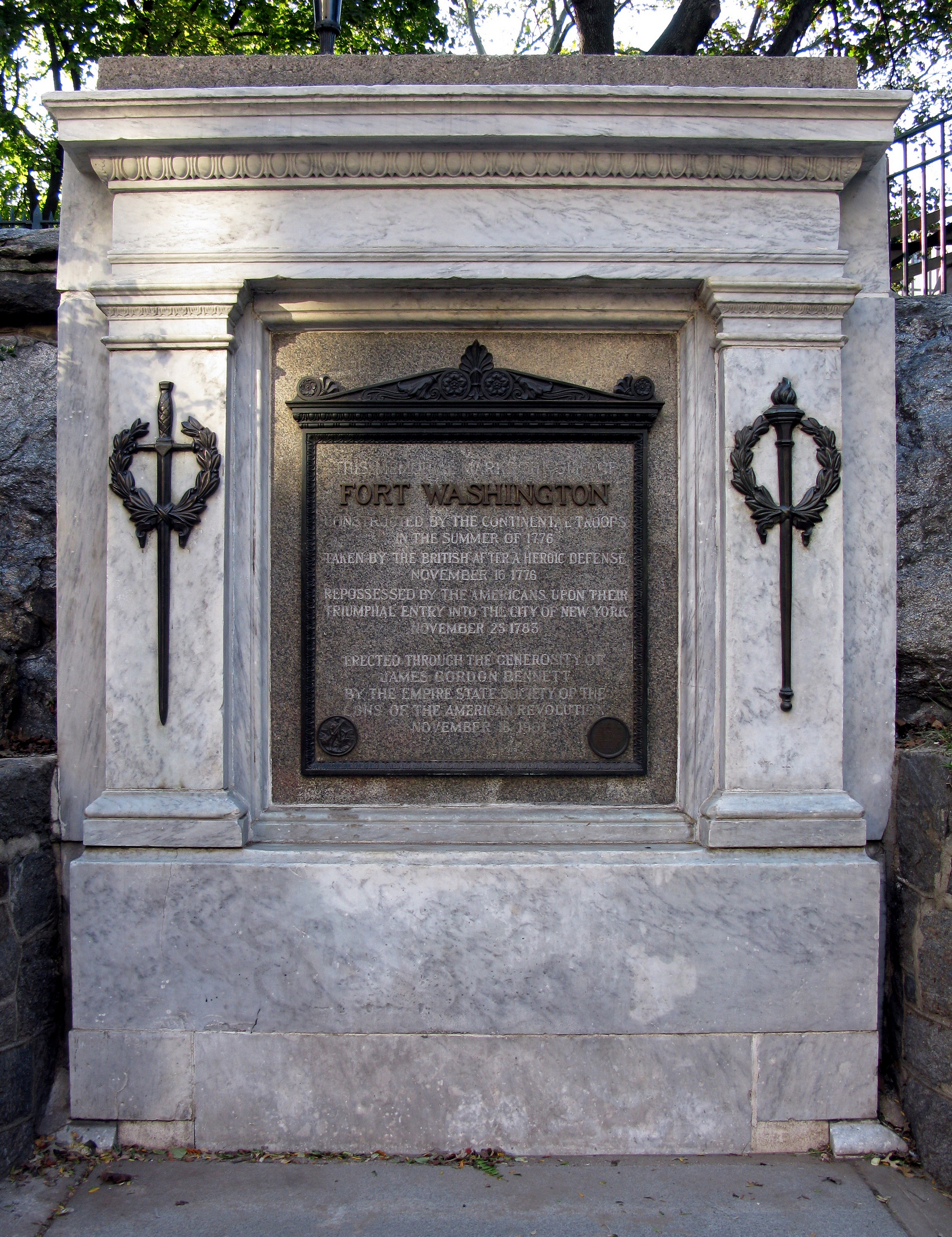
Tablet commemorating the location of Fort Washington

After first gaining control of western Long Island in the Battle of Long Island at the end of August 1776, British General William Howe launched an invasion of Manhattan on September 15. His northward progress was checked the next day in the Battle of Harlem Heights, after which he sought to flank the strong U.S. position on the north of the island. After an abortive landing attempt on October 11, Howe began landing troops in southern Westchester County, New York (in today's The Bronx) on October 18, intending to cut off the Continental Army's avenue of retreat. Washington, aware of the danger, withdrew most of his troops north to White Plains. He left a garrison of 1,200 men at Fort Washington under the command of Colonel Robert Magaw, although this force was inadequate to fully defend the extensive works in hindsight. Meanwhile, Howe left Hugh Percy and a small force below Harlem Heights to monitor the garrison.

On the morning of October 27, sentries informed Magaw that Percy's troops were launching an attack supported by two frigates sailing up the Hudson. Magaw ordered his troops to attack the frigates, and both ships were badly damaged by the guns from Fort Lee and Fort Washington. The frigates could not elevate their own guns to the height of the U.S. positions. The British towed away the frigates, but an artillery duel continued for some time between British and U.S. gunners.

On November 8, about two dozen U.S. soldiers drove off a slightly larger Hessian company from a forward redoubt. The Hessians held higher ground with better cover and had the advantage of artillery support throughout this minor skirmish, but were still unable to maintain their position. A single Continental soldier was wounded in the encounter while at least two Hessians had been killed and an unknown number of others wounded. After burning and looting the temporary structures on the site, the victors occupied it until dark when they returned to their main lines. By the next day the Hessians had reoccupied the spot but were quickly driven off again by a larger U.S. force. This time the Hessians left ten dead with, again, a single U.S. wounded.

Because of these minor successes, Magaw became overconfident; he boasted of being able to hold the fort through a siege to the end of December. On November 2, Magaw's adjutant, William Demont, deserted and supplied British command with detailed plans of the fortifications. Percy sent the information on to Howe, who had defeated Washington a few days earlier at the Battle of White Plains. During the weeks between Washington's northward retreat and the British assault on the fort, reinforcements continued to trickle in to the fort, increasing the size of the garrison to nearly 3,000 men.

=== Plans and preparations ===
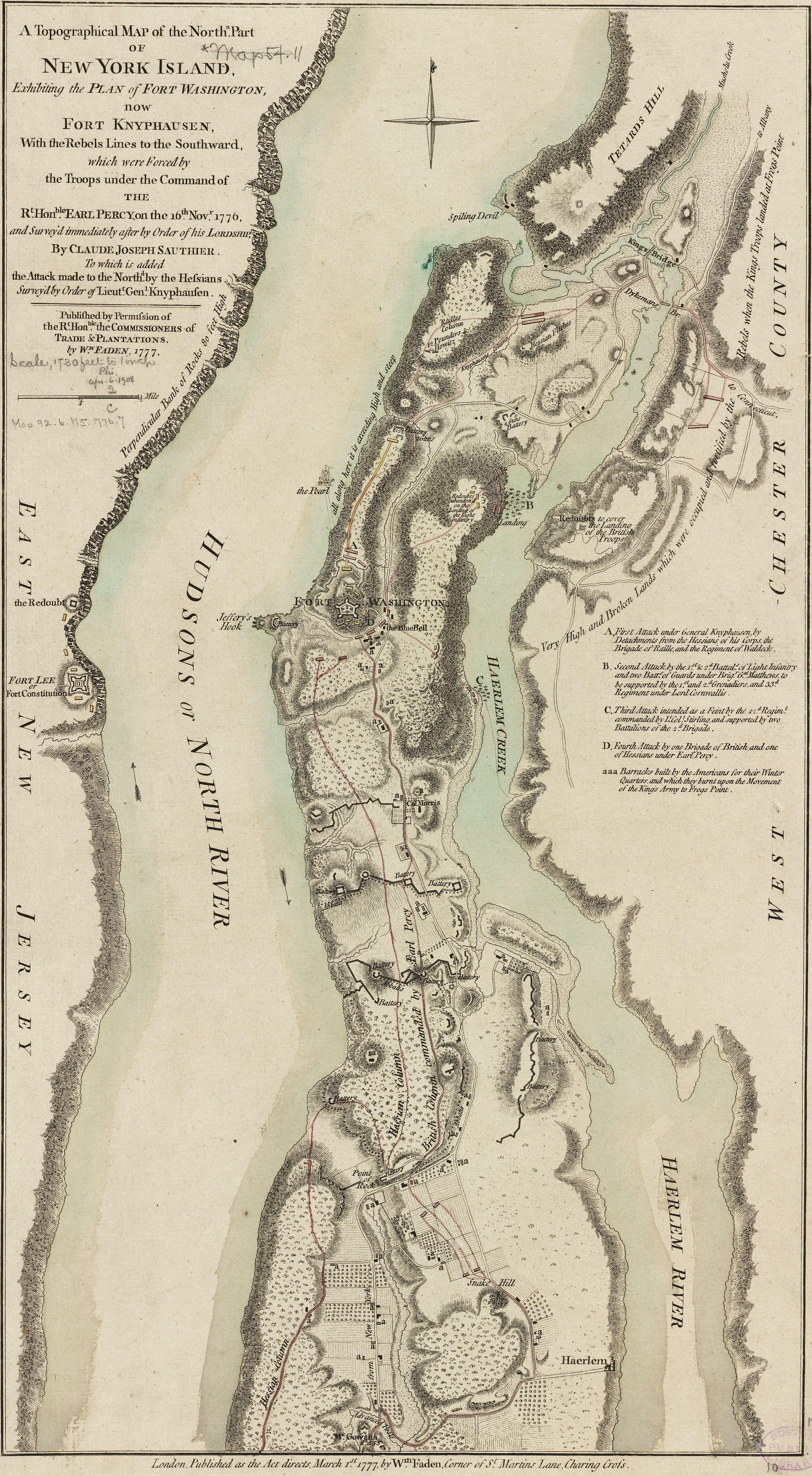
Battle map

Washington had considered abandoning Fort Washington, but he was swayed by Nathanael Greene, who believed the fort could be held and that it was vital to do so. Greene argued that holding the fort would keep open communications across the river and might dissuade the British from attacking New Jersey. Magaw and Putnam concurred with Greene. Washington deferred to Greene and did not abandon the fort.

On November 4, Howe ordered his army south toward Dobbs Ferry. Rather than pursue the U.S. forces in the highlands, and possibly prompted by the intelligence acquired by the defection of Demont, Howe had decided to attack Fort Washington. Washington responded by dividing his army. Seven thousand troops were to remain east of the Hudson under the command of Charles Lee to prevent a British invasion of New England; General William Heath with 3,000 men was to guard the Hudson Highlands to prevent any further British advance north, and Washington with 2,000 men was to go to Fort Lee. On the 13th, Washington and his army reached Fort Lee.

Howe's plan of attack was to storm the fort from three directions while a fourth force feinted; by then it had received reinforcements and was garrisoned by 3,000 men. Hessian troops under the command of Wilhelm von Knyphausen would attack the fort from the north, Percy was to lead a brigade of Hessians and several British battalions from the south, and Lord Cornwallis with the 33rd Regiment of Foot and General Edward Mathew with the light infantry were to attack from the east. The feint was to be by the 42nd Highlanders, who were to land on the east side of Manhattan, south of the fort. Before attacking, Howe sent Lieutenant Colonel James Patterson under a flag of truce on November 15 to deliver a message that if the fort did not surrender, the entire garrison would be killed. Magaw said the Patriots would defend the fort to the "last extremity".

== Battle ==
=== Initial fighting ===
Battle map

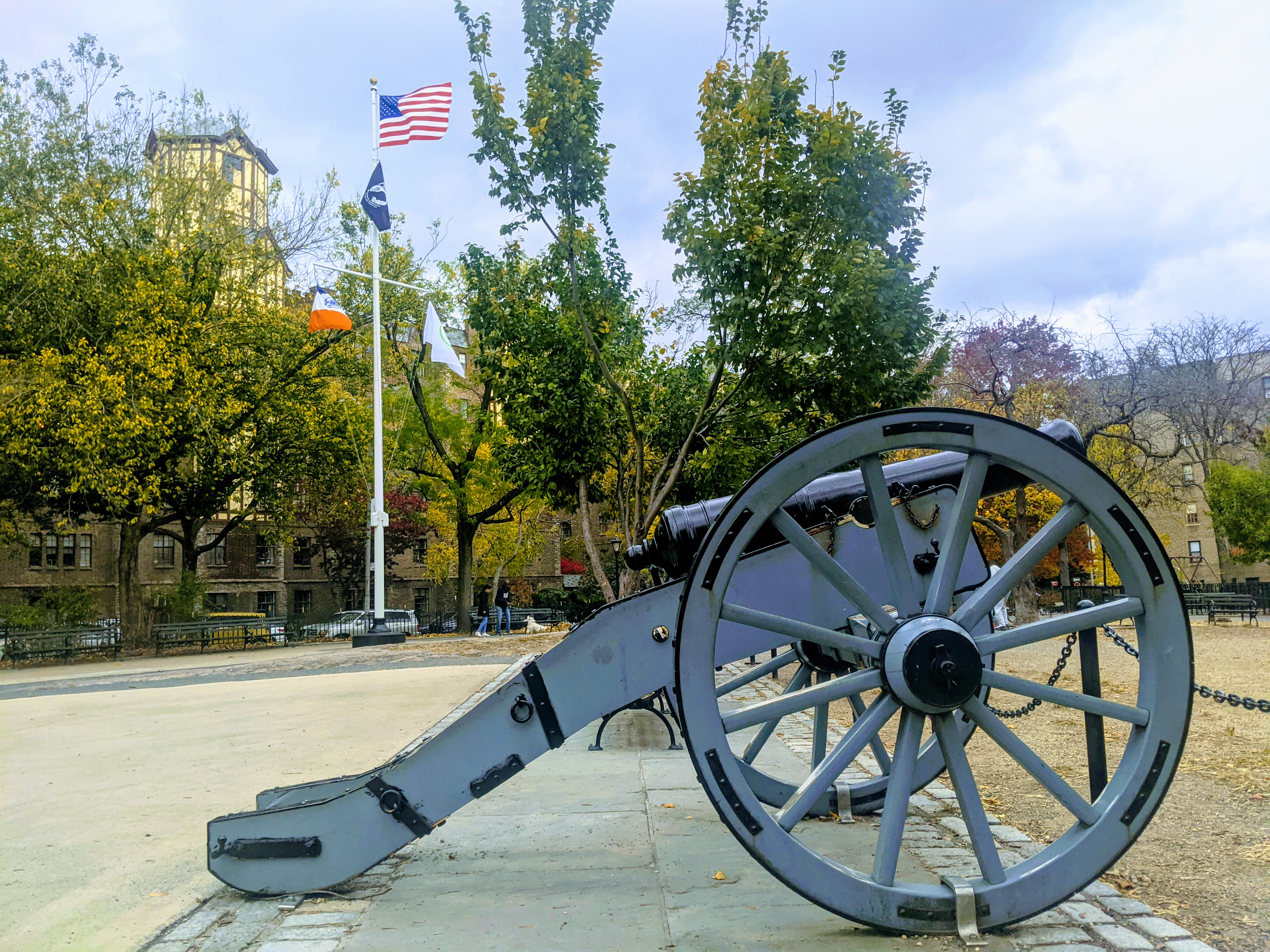
Bennett Park memorial at Fort Washington

Before dawn on November 16, the British and Hessian troops moved out. Knyphausen and his troops were ferried across the Harlem River on flatboats and landed on Manhattan. The flatboatmen then turned down the river to ferry Mathew's troops across the river. However, due to the tide, they were unable to get close enough to the shore to bring the British troops across. Thus, Knyphausen's troops were forced to halt their advance and wait until Mathew could cross. Around 7:00 a.m., Hessian guns opened fire on the American battery on Laurel Hill, and the British frigate Pearl began to fire at the American entrenchments. Also, south of the Fort, Percy had his artillery open fire on the fort itself. Percy's artillery aimed at Magaw's guns, which had damaged the British ships several weeks before.

By noon, Knyphausen and his Hessians restarted their advance. As soon as the tide was high enough, Mathew and his troops, accompanied by Howe, were ferried across the Harlem River. They landed under heavy fire from the American artillery on the Manhattan shore. The British troops charged up the hillside and dispersed the Americans until they reached a redoubt defended by some Pennsylvania Volunteer companies. After brief fighting, the Americans turned and ran towards the fort.

To the north of the fort, the Hessian right, commanded by Johann Rall, moved up the steep hillside south of Spuyten Duyvil Creek against almost no resistance from the Americans. The Hessians began to bring up their artillery. At this point, the main body of Hessians, 4,000 men, under Knyphausen began to advance down the Post Road, which ran between Laurel Hill and the hill Rall was on. The Hessians crossed swampy land and when they approached the wooded hillside near the fort, they were fired upon by 250 riflemen of the Maryland and Virginia Rifle Regiment under the command of Lt. Col. Moses Rawlings. Rawlings' men hid behind rocks and trees and darted from place to place to shoot at the Hessians as they tried to advance through the fallen trees and rocks. The first and second charges by the Hessians were repulsed by Rawlings' riflemen.

John Corbin was in charge of firing a small cannon at the top of a ridge, today known as Bennett Park. During an assault by the Hessians, John was killed, leaving his cannon unmanned. Margaret Corbin had been with her husband on the battlefield the entire time, and, after witnessing his death, she immediately took his place at the cannon, continuing to fire until she was wounded in her arm, chest, and jaw, thereby becoming the first known woman combatant in the American Revolution.

Around the same time, to the south, Percy advanced with some 3,000 men. Percy advanced in two columns with his brigade of Hessians on the left and Percy himself leading the right. About 200 yards from the American lines Percy halted the advance, waiting for the feint by Stirling to take place. Facing Percy was Alexander Graydon and his company. Graydon's superior was Lambert Cadwalader, Magaw's second in command, who was in charge of holding the three defensive lines south of Fort Washington. After hearing that there was a landing on the shore in his rear, Cadwalader sent 50 men to oppose it. The 50 men ran into the feint by Col. Stirling's 42nd Foot of 700 men. Where Stirling landed happened to be the least defended area of the American defenses, and when Cadwalader heard how many men were there, he sent another 100 men to reinforce the 50 he had sent earlier. The British landing parties spread out, looking for a path through the rough terrain on the landing spot. The Americans took up a position on a hilltop and began firing at the British troops who were still crossing the river. Sterling's men were already scaling the heights. They charged the American position, dispersing them.

Upon hearing the firing, Percy ordered his troops to continue their advance. British artillery fire forced Graydon in the first defensive line to fall back to the second line, where Washington, Greene, Putnam and Hugh Mercer were located. The four were encouraged to leave Manhattan, which they did immediately, sailing across the river to Fort Lee. Magaw realized that Cadwalader was in danger of being surrounded and sent orders for him to withdraw toward the fort. Cadwalader's force was pursued by Percy's troops at the same time the troops opposing Stirling's landing were also being chased back to the fort. Stirling's troops, landed in the rear of Cadwalader, paused, believing that there were troops in the entrenchments. Some of the retreating Americans engaged Stirling, giving most of the rest of the American troops enough time to escape.

=== Collapse ===
With the collapse of Magaw's outer lines to the south and east of the fort, the general American retreat towards the perceived safety of the fort took place. To the south, the third defensive line had never been completed so Cadwalader had nowhere left to retreat to except the fort. To the north, the riflemen under Rawlings still held, but barely, as there were fewer riflemen than before and because the increased amount of firing had jammed some of the men's weapons, some of the men were forced to push boulders down the hill at the attacking Hessians. The American battery at Fort Washington was silenced by Pearl. By this time, the riflemen's fire had almost ceased, and the Hessians slowly advanced up the hill and engaged the Americans in hand-to-hand fighting. Overpowering the Americans, the Hessians reached the top of the hill and swarmed into the redoubt with a bayonet charge, capturing it quickly.

Washington, who was watching the battle from the other side of the river, sent a note to Magaw asking him to hold out until nightfall, thinking that the troops could be evacuated during the night. By this time, the Hessians had taken the ground between the fort and the Hudson River. Johann Rall was given the honor of requesting the American surrender by Knyphausen. Rall sent Captain Hohenstein, who spoke English and French, under a flag of truce to call for the fort's surrender. Hohenstein met with Cadwalader, and Cadwalader requested that Magaw be given four hours to consult with his officers. Hohenstein denied the request and gave the Americans a half hour to decide. As Magaw was consulting with his officers, Washington's messenger, Captain John Gooch arrived, just before the fort was completely surrounded, with Washington's request to hold out until nightfall. Magaw attempted to get easier terms for his men, who would only be allowed to keep their belongings, but this failed. Magaw announced his decision to capitulate at 3:00 pm, and at 4:00 pm, the American flag was brought down in the fort, replaced by the British flag. Before the surrender, John Gooch leaped off the side of the fort, tumbled to the bottom of the cliff, evaded musket fire and bayonet stabs, and got onto a boat, arriving at Fort Lee a short while later.

== Forces ==
The British forces consisted of: Composite Battalion of Grenadier, Light Infantry, and Foot Guards, 4th, 10th, 15th, 23rd (Royal Welsh Fusiliers), 27th, 28th, 33rd, 38th, 42nd (Black Watch), 43rd, 52nd Regiments of Foot, and Fraser's Highlanders.

American forces consisted of: 3rd Pennsylvania Regiment, 5th Pennsylvania Regiment, Maryland and Virginia Rifle Regiment, and Bucks County Militia.

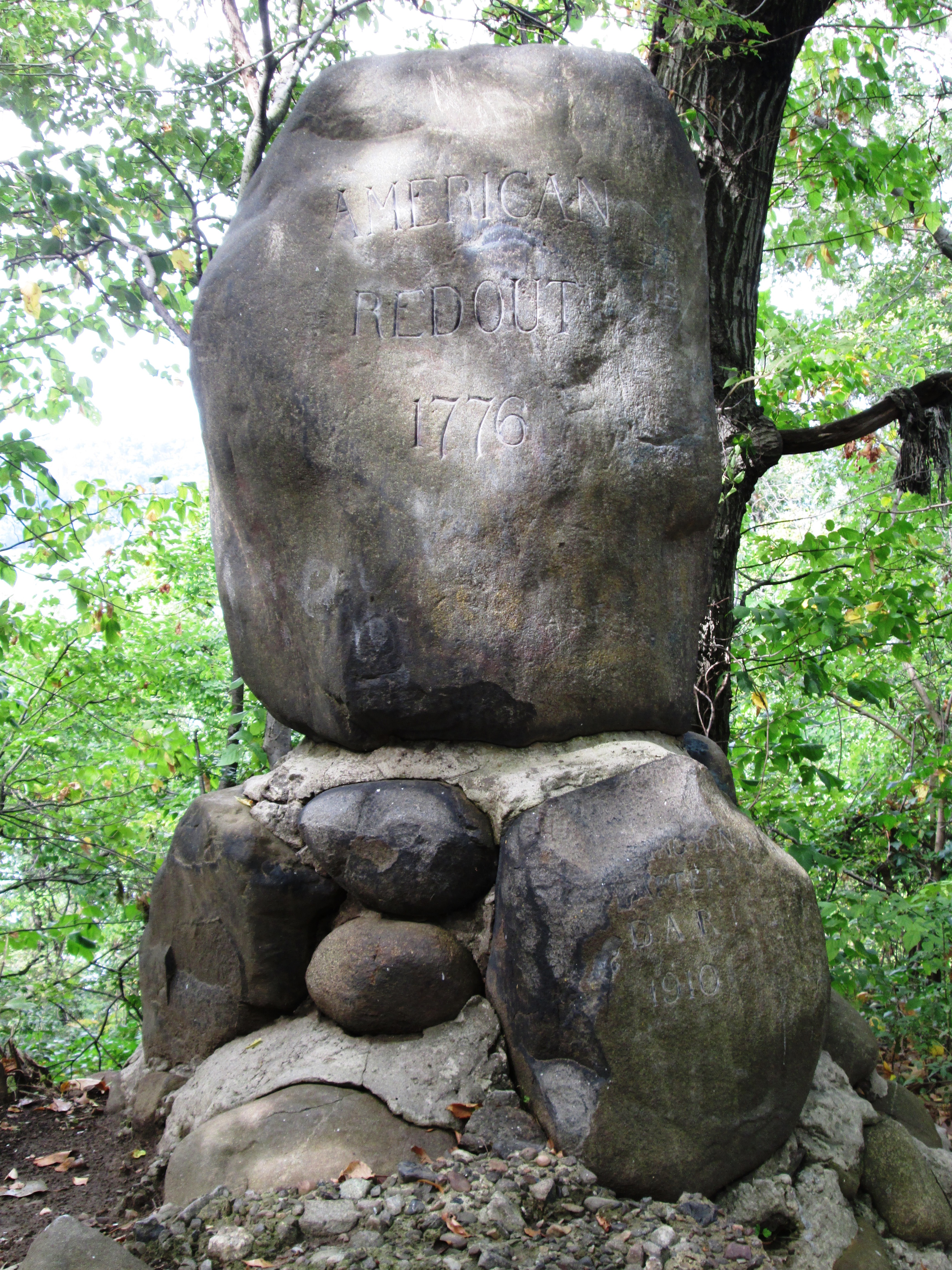
A Daughters of the American Revolution monument to the final position of the Continental troops before crossing the Hudson River

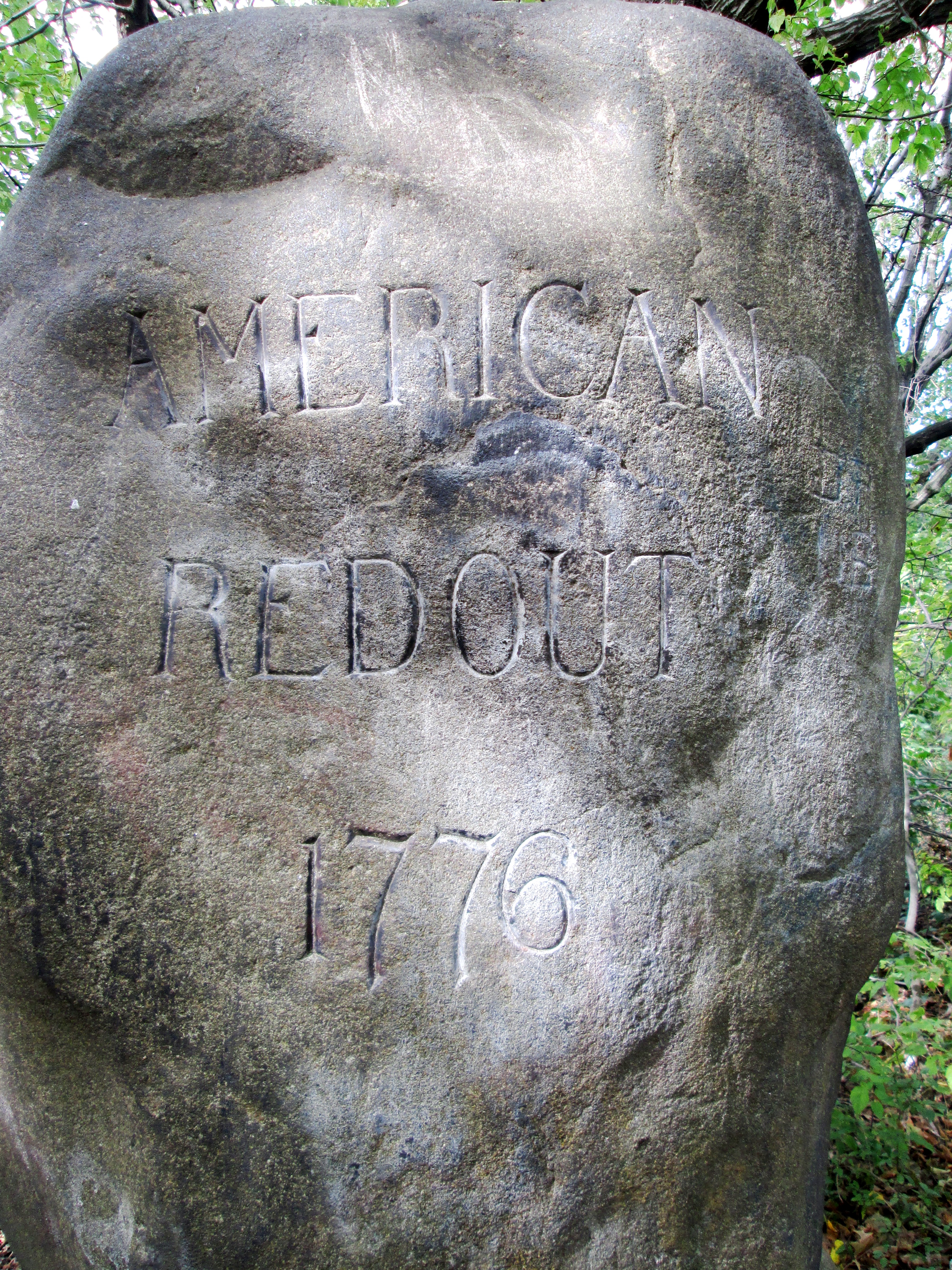
A closeup of the inscription on the marker; under the white graffiti it reads "American Redout 1776"

== Aftermath ==
After the Hessians entered the fort, the American officers attempted to placate the Hessian commander, Captain von Malmburg, who was in charge of the surrender. They invited him into their barracks, and offered him punch, wine and cake, with compliments. As they left the fort, the Hessians stripped the American troops of their baggage and beat some of them, forcing their officers to intervene to prevent further injuries or deaths. The British captured thirty-four cannons, two howitzers, along with many tents, blankets, tools and much ammunition.

The British and Hessians suffered 84 killed and 374 wounded. The Americans had 59 killed, 96 wounded casualties, and 2,837 men captured. Under the usual treatment of prisoners of war in the American Revolutionary War, only 800 survived their captivity to be released 18 months later in a prisoner exchange; nearly three-quarters of the prisoners died.

Three days after the fall of Fort Washington, the Patriots abandoned Fort Lee. Washington and the army retreated through New Jersey and crossed the Delaware River into Pennsylvania northwest of Trenton, pursued as far as New Brunswick, New Jersey, by British forces. After about one month, on the night of December 25–26, 1776, Washington crossed the Delaware and defeated the Hessian garrison under the command of Rall at Trenton. Washington went on to defeat the British next at Princeton, which revived the morale of the American army and the colonies affected by the fall of Fort Washington.

After seven years, on November 25, 1783, with the peace treaty signed, General Washington and Governor George Clinton triumphantly reclaimed Fort Washington as they marched toward lower Manhattan after the last British forces had left New York.

The site of Fort Washington is now in Bennett Park in the Washington Heights neighborhood of Manhattan, just north of the George Washington Bridge. The location of its walls are demarcated by stones placed in the park, and there is a commemorative plaque.

== See also ==
- American Revolutionary War §British New York counter-offensive. The 'Battle of Fort Washington' placed in overall sequence and strategic context.
- Battle of Fort Lee
- Fort Washington (New York)
- Margaret Corbin – a heroine of the battle
- New York and New Jersey campaign
- Prisoners of war in the American Revolutionary War
