= List of places named for Nathanael Greene =

This is a list of places in the United States named for Nathanael Greene, a general in the Continental Army during the American Revolutionary War. General George Washington appointed him to lead the American forces in the Southern Theater of the war in 1780, where he waged a successful campaign of guerrilla warfare against a numerically superior British force led by Charles Cornwallis.

== Counties ==
- Greene County, Alabama
- Greene County, Arkansas
- Greene County, Georgia
- Greene County, Illinois
- Greene County, Indiana
- Greene County, Iowa
- Green County, Kentucky
- Greene County, Mississippi
- Greene County, Missouri
- Greene County, New York
- Greene County, North Carolina
- Greene County, Ohio
- Greene County, Pennsylvania
- Greenville County, South Carolina
- Greene County, Tennessee
- Greene County, Virginia
- Green County, Wisconsin
- Greensville County, Virginia (possibly; there are other claimed origins)

== Cities, towns, and villages ==
- Fort Greene, Brooklyn, New York
- Greene, Maine
- Greene, New York
- Greene, Rhode Island
- Greensboro, Alabama
- Greensboro, Georgia
- Greensboro, North Carolina
- Greensboro, Pennsylvania
- Greensburg, Pennsylvania
- Greensburg, Kentucky
- Greeneville, Tennessee
- Greenville, Kentucky
- Greenville, New York
- Greenville, Mississippi in Jefferson County
- Greenville, Mississippi, in Washington County
- Greenville, North Carolina
- Greenville, Ohio
- Greenville, Pennsylvania
- Greenville, Rhode Island
- Greenville, South Carolina
- Greene Township, Franklin County, Pennsylvania
- Greene Township, Pike County, Pennsylvania
- Green Township, Hamilton County, Ohio

== Other places ==
- BSA, General Greene Council, Greensboro, North Carolina
- Fort Greene Park in Brooklyn, New York
- Greene Avenue, Brooklyn, New York
- General Green Avenue, Trenton, New Jersey
- Fort Greene Ville, Ohio
- General Greene Elementary School, Greensboro, North Carolina
- General Greene Village Apartment Complex, Springfield, New Jersey
- General Nathanael Greene Homestead, Coventry, Rhode Island
- Greene Central School, Greene, Maine
- Green River (Kentucky)
- Greeneville High School, Greeneville, Tennessee
- Greeneville Middle School, Greeneville, Tennessee
- Nathanael B. Greene Community Center, Guilford, Connecticut
- Nathanael Greene Academy, Greensboro, Georgia
- Nathanael Greene Army Reserve Center, Narragansett, Rhode Island
- Nathanael Greene Elementary School, Chicago, Illinois
- Nathanael Greene Elementary School, Liberty, North Carolina
- Nathanael Greene Elementary School, Pawtucket, Rhode Island
- Nathanael Greene Elementary School, Stanardsville, Virginia
- Nathanael Greene Historical Foundation, Greensboro, Pennsylvania
- Nathanael Greene/Close Memorial Park, Springfield, Missouri
- Nathanael Greene Memorial Bridge Old Forge Road, Warwick North Kingstown Line, Rhode Island
- Nathanael Greene Middle School, Providence, Rhode Island
- Nathanael Greene Museum, Greeneville, Tennessee
- Nathanael Greene Park, Springfield, Missouri
- Nathanael Greene's Publick House, Greene, New York
- Natty Greene's Pub & Brewing Company, Greensboro, North Carolina
- North Greene High School, Greeneville, Tennessee
- North Greene Middle School, Greeneville, Tennessee
- South Greene High School, Greeneville, Tennessee
- South Greene Middle School, Greeneville, Tennessee
- West Greene High School, Mosheim, Tennessee
- West Greene Middle School, Mosheim, Tennessee
- Camp Greene (neighborhood), Charlotte, NC
- Greene Street, Marietta, Ohio.

== See also ==
- USS General Greene, for the four United States Navy ships that have been named for Nathanael Greene.
