= Guilford Court House, North Carolina =

Building in North Carolina, United States

Coordinates: 36.1327425°N 79.8422792°W

Guilford Court House, North Carolina, was the county seat of Guilford County before being replaced by Greensboro in 1808. It no longer exists as an identifiable community, having been absorbed by Greensboro. On March 15, 1781, it was the site of the Battle of Guilford Court House, which is now commemorated at Guilford Courthouse National Military Park. The Battle was between the Continental Army under general Nathanael Greene and the British Army under general Charles Cornwallis. The battle resulted in a British victory, but Greene's forces inflicted heavy casualties on Cornwallis' forces.

== History ==
Guilford County was organized in 1770 from land that had previously been Rowan County and Orange County. Robert Lindsay had a general store and a coppersmith shop near the courthouse, and William Dick ran wagon factory and blacksmith shop. In-laws Thomas Henderson and Thomas Searcy had a "mercantile establishment" at Guilford Court House. In 1781, in-laws and partners Alexander Martin and Thomas Henderson bought 350 acres on the site of the Revolutionary War battle, which had been seized by the state from recently departed Tory Edmund Fanning.

Martinville, North Carolina, sometimes inaccurately referred to as Martinsville, was chartered by the North Carolina General Assembly on December 29, 1785. The town was platted by surveyor William Dent. The courthouse building was located half a mile from the center of town. Lots were purchased by William Reed, William Dick, Patrick Shaw, William Dent, John Mars, Richard Wilson, and Charles Bruce, "a lawyer, whom tradition says was the first man to instruct Andrew Jackson In legal phraseology." Martinville was always a small place; the settlement consisted of the "courthouse, two stores...a jail and private dwellings." At its peak Martinville had 200 to 300 residents.

The village was originally at the approximate geographical center of the county, but became peripheral after Randolph County was established in 1779 and Rockingham County was organized in 1785. The county seat was moved to Greensboro, North Carolina in 1809 and thereafter the town languished.
