= Nathanael Greene Monument (Greensboro, North Carolina) =

Monument at Guilford Courthouse National Military Park in Greensboro, North Carolina

- The monument in 2022
- Artist: Francis Herman Packer
- Year: 1915
- Subject: Nathanael Greene
- Location: Greensboro, North Carolina

The Nathanael Greene Monument is a monument at Guilford Courthouse National Military Park in Greensboro, North Carolina.

== History ==
The monument was erected at Guilford Courthouse National Military Park on July 3, 1915. It was designed by Francis Herman Packer. It consists of two bronze statues, one of American Revolutionary War general Nathanael Greene riding a stallion and another of the Greek goddess Athena holding a shield and laurels. The two sculptures are made of bronze and stand on granite bases. The monument is over 27 feet tall. The monument is located at the center of the American Second Line location in the park.
