= The Graham Vault =

Coordinates: 32.07573°N 81.08960°W

The Graham Vault is a burial vault in Colonial Park Cemetery in Savannah, Georgia, which held the remains of two officers on opposite sides of the Revolutionary War: American General Nathaniel Greene and British Lieutenant Colonel John Maitland.

== History ==
The Graham Vault was built for John Graham, the Royalist Lieutenant Governor of Georgia and owner of Mulberry Grove Plantation. Graham bought the plantation in 1774 and rebuilt the main house and new supporting buildings; however, at the outbreak of the Revolutionary War, Graham abandoned the plantation and his vault, moving back to England.

=== Maitland interment ===
Maitland, who was son of Charles Maitland, 6th Earl of Lauderdale, was a lieutenant-colonel of the 1st Battalion, 71st Regiment of Foot, Fraser's Highlanders. In June 1779, he fought at the Battle of Stono Ferry, in which he commanded the British redoubt and helped lift the siege of Savannah. He died of malaria in Savannah in October 1779 and was buried in the Graham Vault.

=== Greene interment ===
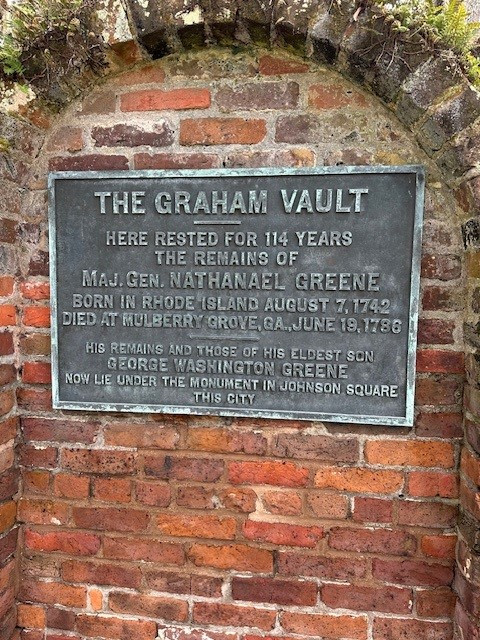
The Graham Vault, Colonial Park Cemetery, Savannah, Georgia

After returning to his native Newport, Rhode Island, after the Revolutionary War, Greene moved to Savannah in 1785 after being awarded ownership of Graham's Mulberry Grove Plantation. Greene fell ill on June 12, 1786, and he died at Mulberry Grove seven days later, at the age of 43. He was buried in the Graham Vault, alongside Maitland.

=== Disinterment ===
Mailtand and Greene remained buried together until the 20th century. Though some histories refer to them as rivals, there is no evidence they faced one another in battle.

On November 14, 1902, Greene's remains were identified and moved to underneath the Nathanael Greene Monument in Savannah's Johnson Square.

Eight decades later, in 1981, Maitland's remains were identified and disinterred and sent back to his native Scotland, where they were reinterred in the Maitland family vault in the Lauderdale Aisle of St. Mary's Collegiate Church, Haddington.
