= John Maitland (British Army officer) =

British Army officer and politician

John Maitland MP
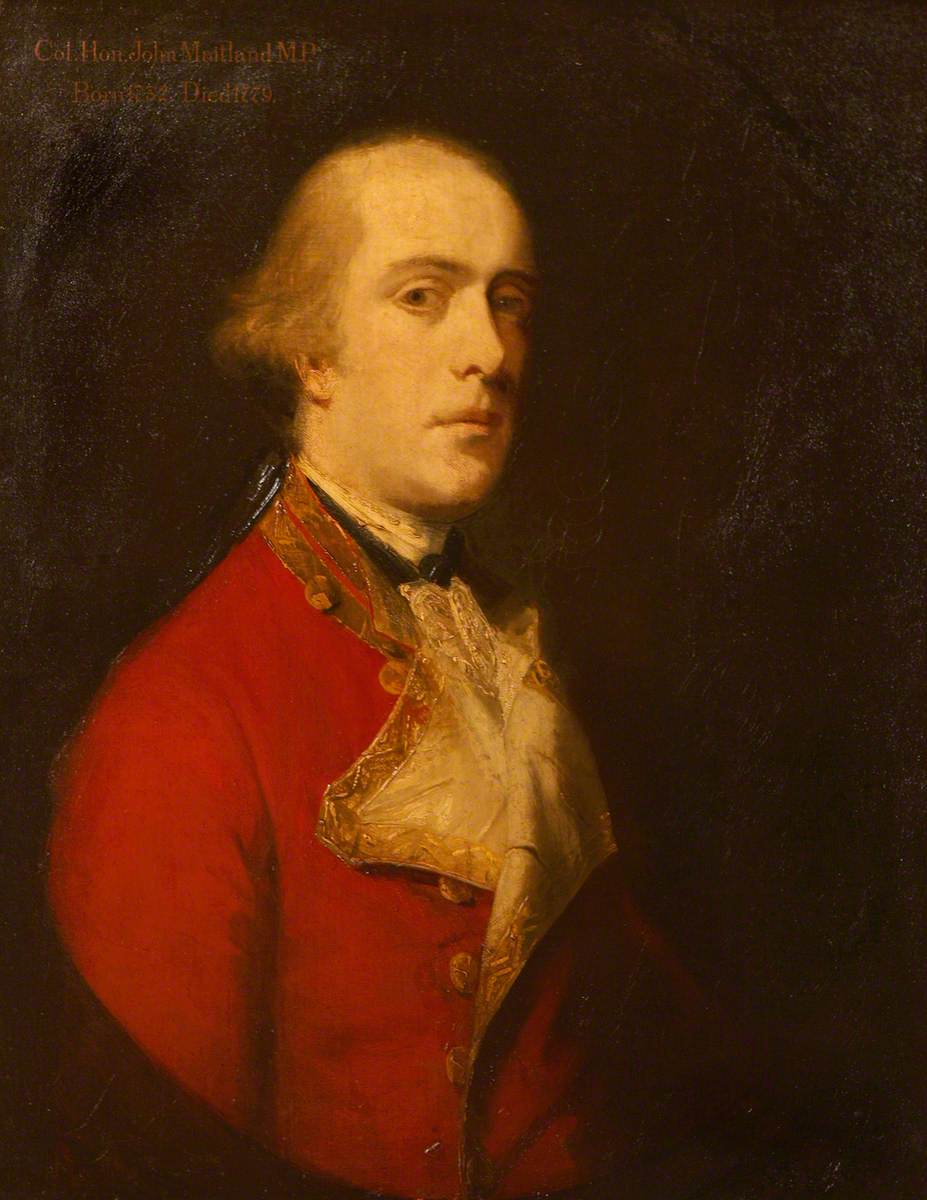
- Portrait by Joshua Reynolds
- Born: 24 November 1733; Edinburgh, Scotland
- Died: 22 October 1779 (Age 45); Savannah, Georgia
- Burial place: Scotland
- Military career
- Allegiance: Kingdom of Great Britain
- Branch: Royal Marines; British Army
- Service years: 1757–1779
- Rank: Lieutenant Colonel
- Commands: 71st Regiment of Foot
- Conflicts: Seven Years' War; American Revolutionary War; Battle of Stono Ferry; Siege of Savannah

Lieutenant-Colonel John Maitland MP (24 November 1733 – 22 October 1779) was a British Army officer and politician who represented Haddington Burghs in the House of Commons of Great Britain from 1774 to 1779.

Maitland was the eighth surviving son of Charles Maitland, 6th Earl of Lauderdale, and his wife Lady Elizabeth Ogilvy, daughter of James Ogilvy, 4th Earl of Findlater. He became a Captain in the Royal Marines on 22 March 1757 and served in the Seven Years' War, losing his right arm in action. When peace came in 1763 he went onto half-pay.

In 1768 Maitland stood for Parliament at Haddington Burghs when there was a double return, but decided not to contest the matter. He was appointed Clerk of the Pipe in Scottish Exchequer in 1769. He returned to the active list in 1770 and became a Major on 1 October 1775. Meanwhile, he was returned at the 1774 general election as Member of Parliament for Haddington Burghs. Little is known of his parliamentary career and from 1776 he was away serving in America.

In May 1778 Maitland was commanding marines against vessels in the Delaware during the American Revolutionary War and became lieutenant-colonel of the 1st Battalion, 71st Regiment of Foot, Fraser's Highlanders on 14 October 1778. He fought at the Battle of Stono Ferry, where he commanded the British redoubt, and helped lift the siege of Savannah. He died of malaria on 22 October 1779 shortly after the siege was lifted. His death received relatively little attention in English newspapers but made major headlines in Scottish periodicals, who often felt Maitland had not been given proper credit for his role in the siege. Poets Robert Alves and Robert Colvill wrote poems praising his military career, with both comparing him favorably to James Wolfe during the Battle of the Plains of Abraham. The Royal Gazette, a Loyalist newspaper based in New York run by James Rivington, also published a number of laudatory poems about Maitland, including one in which the spirit of Maitland praises Margaret Allen De Lancey, wife of James De Lancey, for immortalising him through poetry.

For over a century, he was interred The Graham Vault in Savannah's Colonial Park Cemetery, alongside his rival Nathanael Greene. In 1981, Dr. Preston Russell gained permission from the city to enter the tomb. He took Maitland's remains back to his native Scotland.

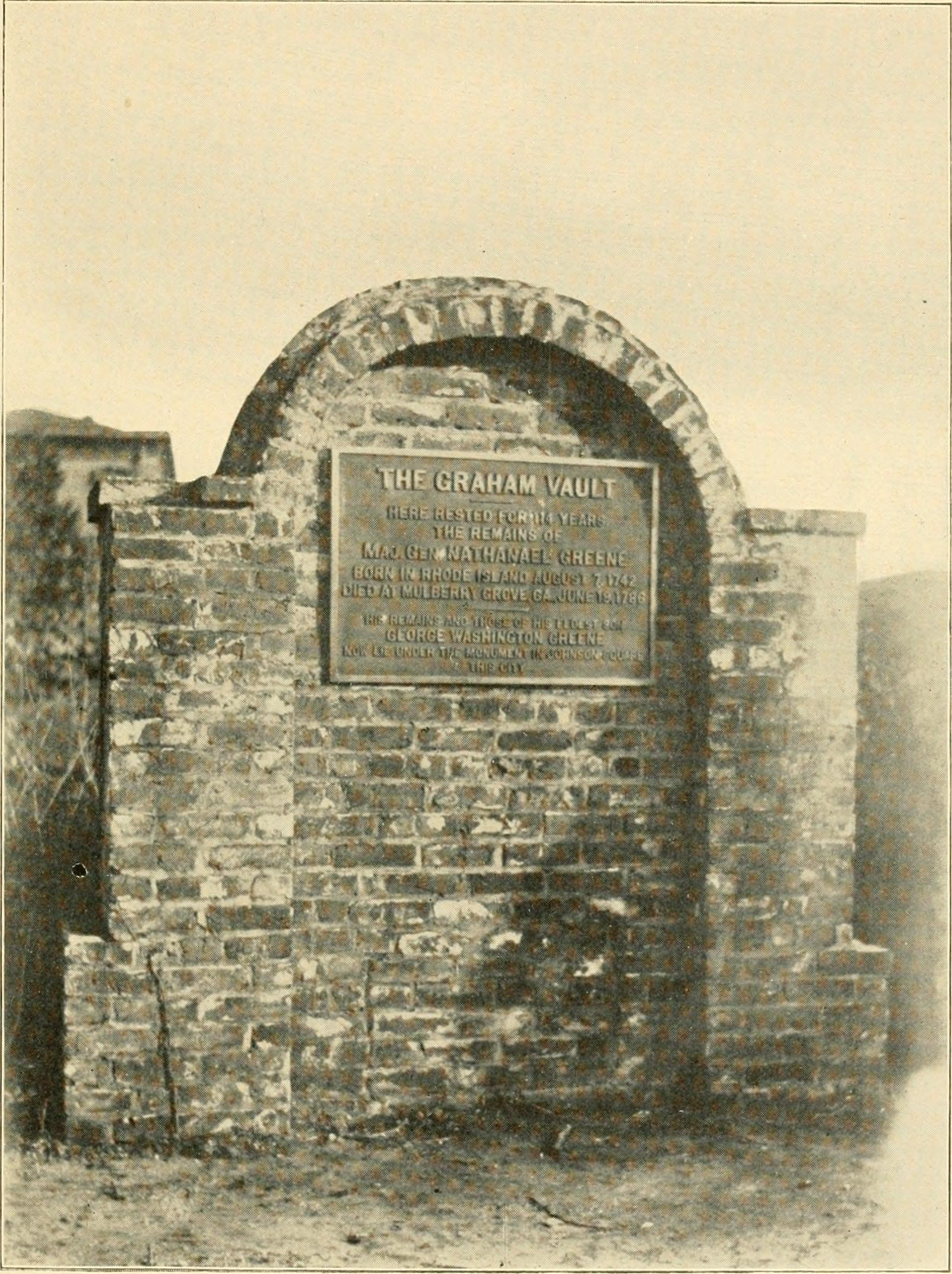
The Graham Vault, in which Maitland was interred between 1779 and 1981

Parliament of Great Britain
Preceded by Patrick Warrender	Member of Parliament for Haddington Burghs; 1774–1779	Succeeded by Francis Charteris
