= USS General Greene =

Two ships in the United States Navy have been named USS General Greene for Nathanael Greene.

- USRC General Green was a revenue cutter built in 1791
- USS General Greene (1799) was a frigate built in 1799 and participated in the Quasi-War with France

Other ships are similarly named for Nathanael Greene:

- USS Nathanael Greene (SSBN-636), a James Madison-class fleet ballistic missile submarine
- USAV MG Nathanael Greene (LT-801), a United States Army tugboat
