= USS Nathanael Greene =

Submarine of the United States

USS Nathanael Greene (SSBN-636)
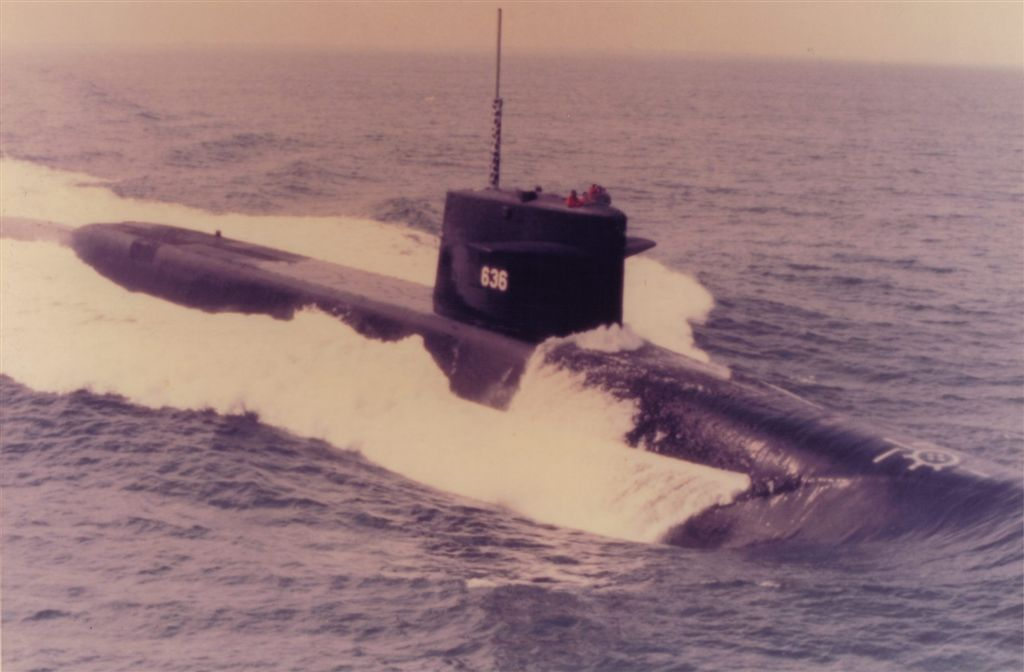
- Nathanael Greene, probably during her sea trials off New England in the mid-1960s

History

United States
- Namesake: Nathanael Greene (1746-1782), a major general in the Continental Army during the American Revolutionary War
- Ordered: 21 July 1961
- Builder: Portsmouth Naval Shipyard, Kittery, Maine
- Laid down: 21 May 1962
- Launched: 12 May 1964
- Sponsored by: Mrs. Neander W. Wade
- Commissioned: 19 December 1964
- Decommissioned: 15 December 1986
- Stricken: 31 January 1987
- Fate: Scrapped via Ship-Submarine Recycling Program began 1 September 1998 and completed 20 October 2000
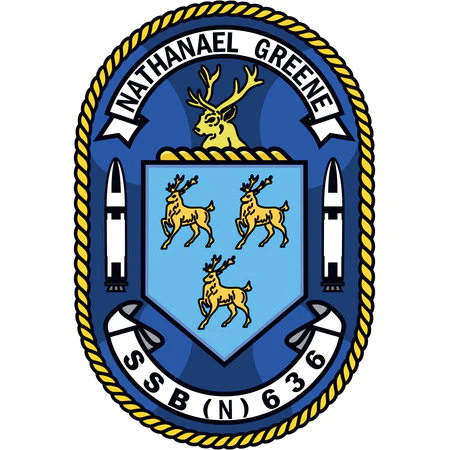
- Badge

General characteristics
- Class & type: James Madison-class submarine
- Displacement: 7,250 long tons (7,366 t) surfaced; 8,250 long tons (8,382 t) submerged; 6,700 long tons (6,808 t) light
- Length: 425 ft (130 m)
- Beam: 33 ft (10 m)
- Draft: 31 ft 5 in (9.58 m)
- Installed power: S5W reactor
- Propulsion: 2 × geared steam turbines, one shaft 15,000 shp (11,185 kW)
- Speed: 16 knots (30 km/h; 18 mph) surfaced; 21 knots (39 km/h; 24 mph) submerged
- Test depth: 1,300 ft (400 m)
- Complement: Two crews (Blue and Gold) of 13 officers and 130 men each
- Armament: 4 × 21 in (533 mm) torpedo tubes forward; 16 × ballistic missile tubes

USS Nathanael Greene (SSBN-636) was a James Madison-class fleet ballistic missile submarine. It was the third ship of the United States Navy to be named for Major General Nathanael Greene (1746–1786), who served in the Continental Army during the American Revolutionary War.^{a}

== Construction and commissioning ==
Nathanael Greene's keel was laid down on 21 May 1962 at the Portsmouth Naval Shipyard in Kittery, Maine. The construction of the ship was supervised by Commander Lawrence Dennis Ballou. She was launched on 12 May 1964, sponsored by Mrs. Neander W. Wade, a descendant of Nathanael Greene, and commissioned on 19 December 1964 with Commander Robert E. Crispin in command of the Blue Crew and Commander William M. Cossaboom in command of the Gold Crew.

== Service history ==
Nathanael Greene departed Portsmouth for shakedown on 30 December 1964, with her Gold Crew embarked; it was relieved on 1 February 1965 by the Blue Crew. Her shakedown period was followed by repairs and alterations at Portsmouth Naval Shipyard, after which the submarine, with her Blue Crew embarked, departed the shipyard for ballistic missile loading and her initial Polaris missile deterrent patrol.

In 1970-1971 Nathanael Greene was refueled and received its conversion to launch Poseidon missiles at Newport News Shipbuilding. Following Yard period and Shakedown, the Greene proceeded to Cape Canaveral for a test missile launch. In March 1972 the Greene departed for her first deterrent patrol following conversion ending up in Holy Loch, Scotland.

== Events and deactivation ==
On January 29, 1970, while making a surface run into port in thick fog, Nathanael Greene ran aground in about 16 feet (4.9 m) of water. She was refloated after about 7 hours.

On August 11, 1984, Nathanael Greene lost her propeller in the Irish Sea. While proceeding back to Holy Loch at about 3 knots (5.6 km/h; 3.5 mph) using her secondary propulsion motor, a transit of about 5 or 6 days, she was redirected to Her Majesty's Naval Base, Clyde, at Faslane as the U.S. dry dock in Holy Loch was fully committed and unavailable, while Admiralty Floating Dock No. 60 at Faslane was available. While in the Faslane dry dock, a fire occurred in one of the dock's enclosed machinery spaces on 18 August 1984. The fire was quickly extinguished and did not affect the Greene. While in dry dock, it was established that the main shaft had broken with the loss of about a third of its length along with the propeller. Repairs were completed in about 12 days with the Nathanael Green undocked on 3 September 1984.

On 13 March 1986, Nathanael Greene ran aground in the Irish Sea, suffering severe damage to her rudder and ballast tanks. Her grounding was a serious accident involving a U.S. Navy nuclear-powered ballistic missile submarine. She was deactivated while still in commission in May 1987. Her early deactivation was decided both as a result of the damage sustained in the accident as well as in accordance with the limitations set by the SALT II treaty.

== Decommissioning and disposal ==
Nathanael Greene was decommissioned on 15 December 1986 and stricken from the Naval Vessel Register on 31 January 1987. Her removal from service allowed the United States to comply easily with the ballistic missile limits of the SALT II strategic arms limitation treaty.

Nathanael Greene entered the U.S. Navy's Nuclear-Powered Ship and Submarine Recycling Program at Bremerton, Washington, on 1 September 1998. Her scrapping was completed on 20 October 2000.

== Commemoration ==
Nathanael Greene's sail has been restored and is now on display in Port Canaveral, Florida, as a memorial to the original 41 for Freedom fleet ballistic missile submarines.

== Gallery ==
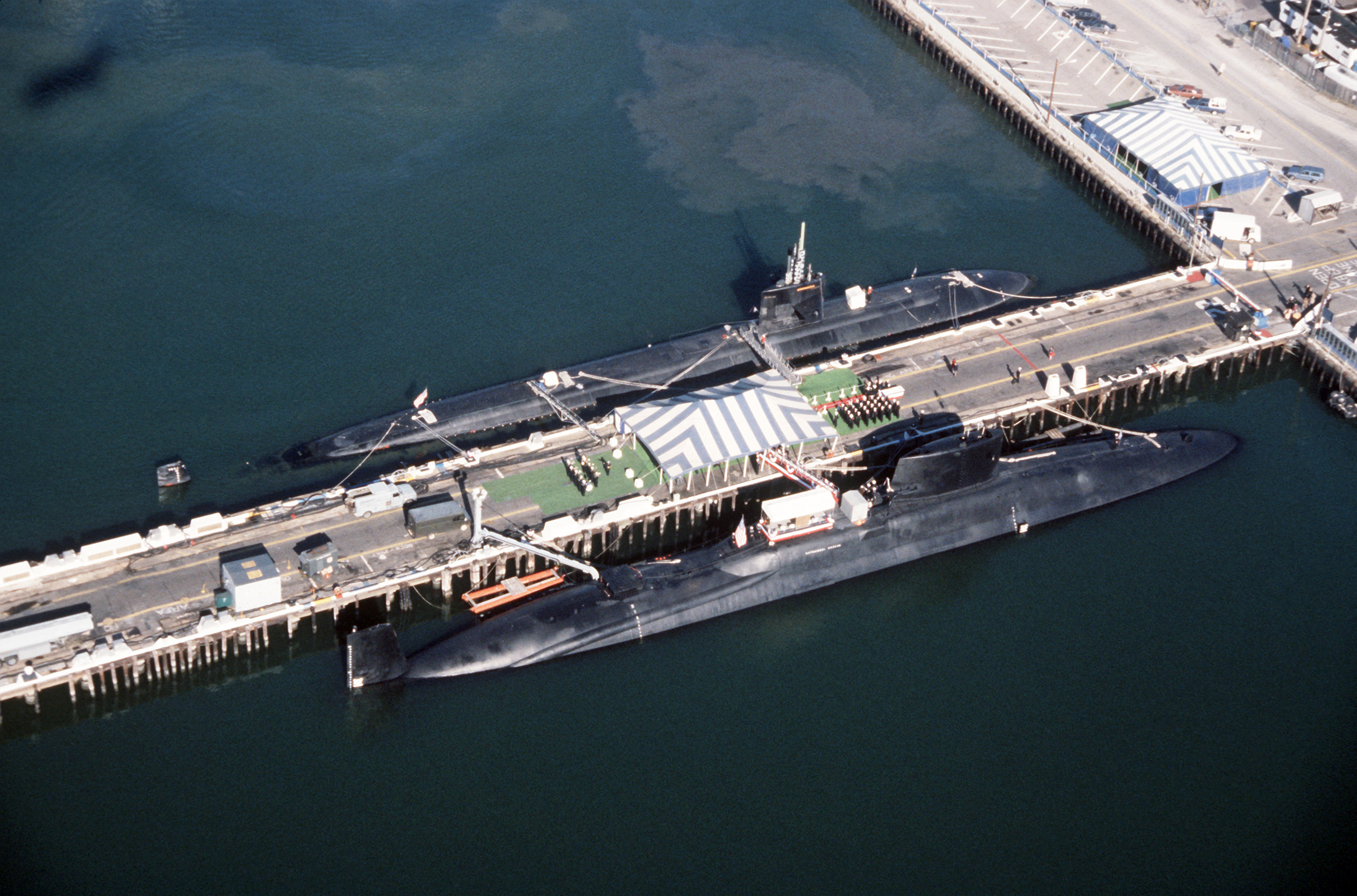
Nathanael Green (bottom) during her decommissioning ceremony with USS Baltimore (SSN-704) (top) across the pier

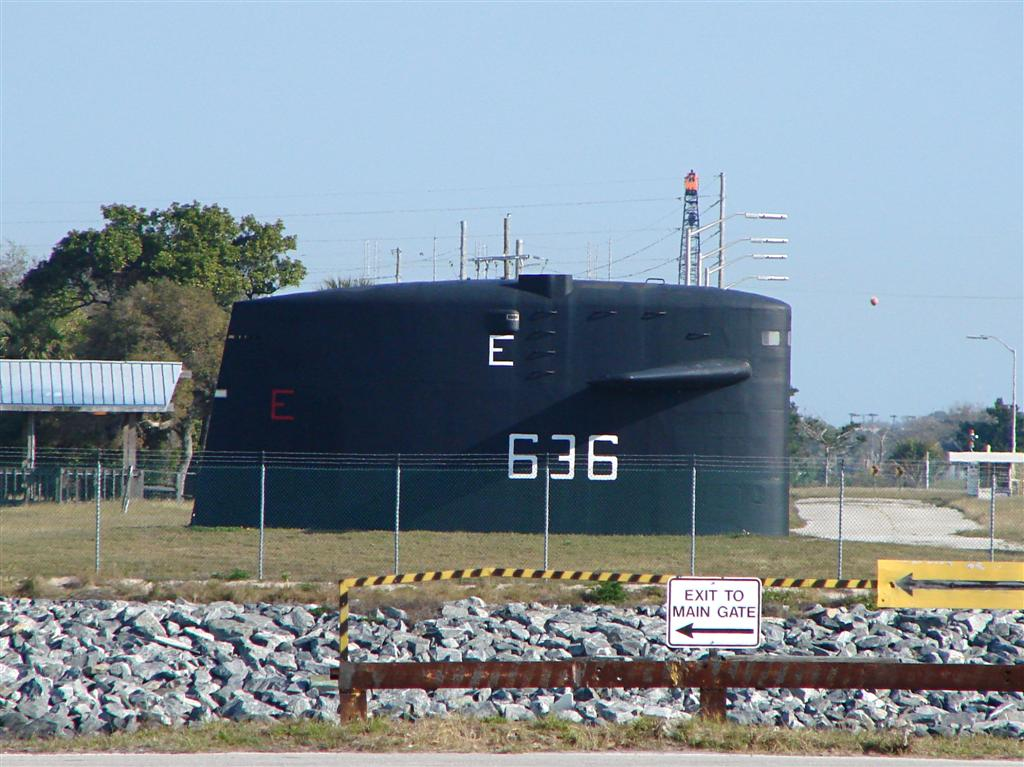
The sail of USS Nathanael Greene on display in Port Canaveral, Florida

== Notes ==
^a The other two ships are named USS General Greene.
