= Battle of Guilford Court House =

1781 battle of the American Revolutionary War

Coordinates: 36.132°N 79.844°W

- Part of the American Revolutionary War
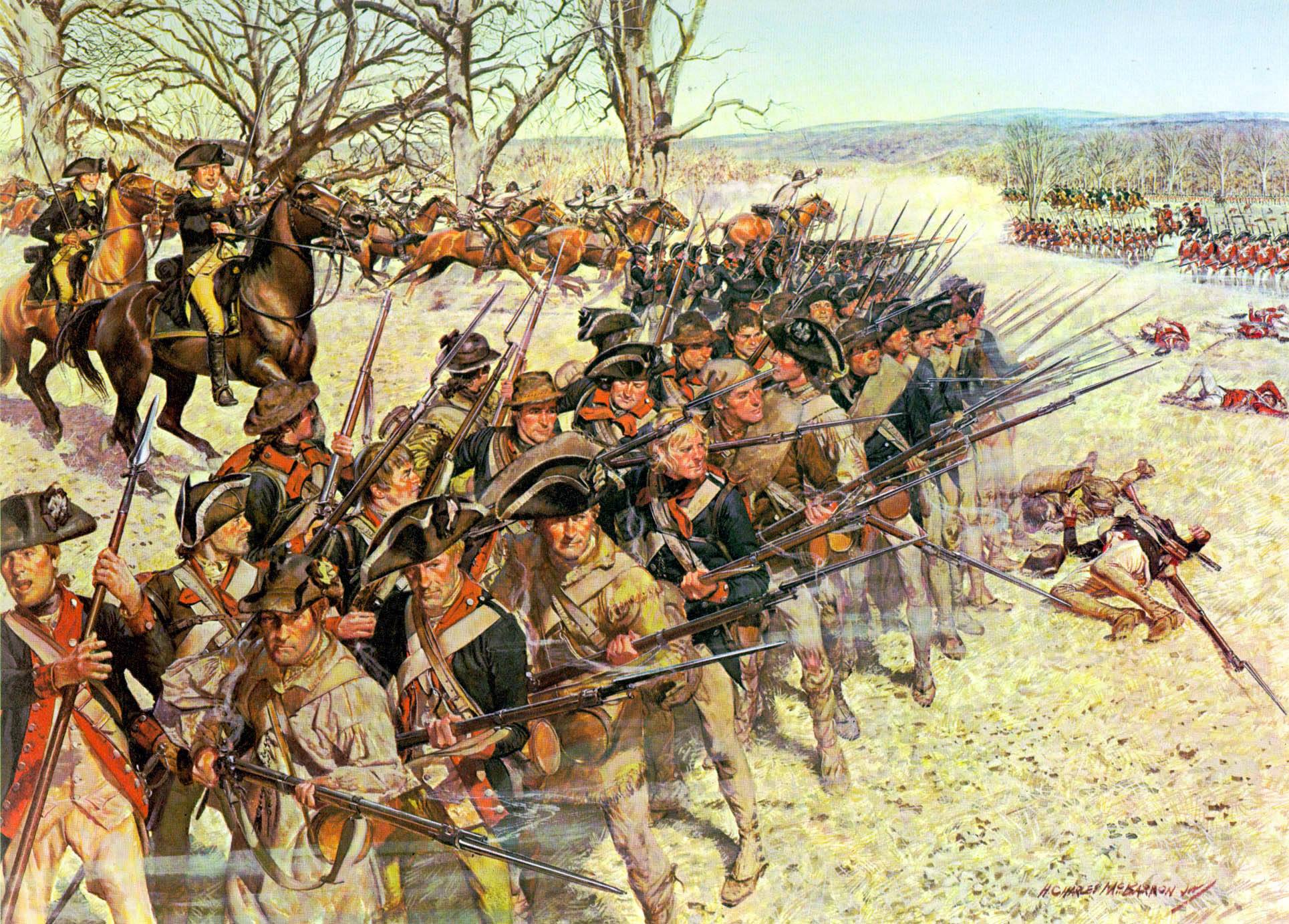
- Battle of Guilford Court House; H. Charles McBarron Jr., 1992
| Date | March 15, 1781 |
| Location | Greensboro, North Carolina, British America |
| Result | British victory (see Aftermath) |

Belligerents
| Great Britain; Hesse-Kassel; Ansbach-Bayreuth | United States |

Commanders and leaders
| Charles Cornwallis; Banastre Tarleton (WIA); Charles O'Hara (WIA) | Nathanael Greene |

Strength
| 2,100 | 4,500 |

Casualties and losses
| 93 killed 413 wounded 26 missing or captured | 79 killed 184–185 wounded 75 wounded prisoners 971–1,046 missing ^{[a]} |
- [a] The American casualty list was compiled on March 16; most of the missing were North Carolina militiamen who had simply left once the fighting ended.

The Battle of Guilford Court House was fought on 15 March 1781 during the American Revolutionary War, near Greensboro, North Carolina. A 2,100-man British force under the command of Lieutenant General Charles Cornwallis defeated Major General Nathanael Greene's 4,500 Americans. The British Army suffered considerable casualties, with estimates as high as 27% of their total force. The battle was "the largest and most hotly contested action" in the American Revolution's southern theater. Before the battle, the British had great success in regaining control of Georgia and South Carolina with the aid of strong Loyalist factions and thought that North Carolina might be within their grasp. The British were in the process of heavy, but unsuccessful recruitment in North Carolina when this battle put an end to their recruiting drive. The battle is commemorated at Guilford Courthouse National Military Park and associated Hoskins House Historic District.

In the wake of the battle, Greene moved into South Carolina. Cornwallis moved his army to Wilmington to rest and resupply. Later, Cornwallis chose to march into Virginia and attempt to link with roughly 3,500 men under British Major General Phillips and Brigadier General Benedict Arnold. These decisions allowed Greene to unravel British control of the South, while leading Cornwallis to Yorktown, where he was forced to surrender to General George Washington and French Lieutenant General Comte de Rochambeau.

== Background ==
On 18 January 1781 Lord Cornwallis learned he had lost one-quarter of his army at the Battle of Cowpens. Yet he was still determined to pursue General Nathanael Greene into North Carolina and destroy Greene's army. According to Cornwallis, "The loss of my light troops could only be remedied by the activity of the whole corps." At Ramsour's Mill, Cornwallis burned his baggage train, except the wagons he needed to carry medical supplies, salt, ammunition, and the sick. In the words of Charles O'Hara, "In this situation, without Baggage, necessaries, or Provisions of any sort...it was resolved to follow Greene's army to the end of the World."

As Cornwallis departed Ramsour's Mill on 28 January, Greene sought to reunite his command but ordered Edward Carrington to prepare for possible retreat across the Dan River into Virginia. In Greene's words, "It is necessary we should take every possible precaution. But I am not without hopes of ruining Lord Cornwallis, if he persists in his mad scheme of pushing through the Country..."

On 3 February, Greene joined Daniel Morgan's Continentals at Trading Ford on the Yadkin River, and on 7 February, Lighthorse Harry Lee rendezvoused with the army at Guilford Court House. By 9 February, Greene commanded 2,036 men, 1,426 of whom were regular infantry, whereas Cornwallis had about 2,440 men, 2,000 of whom were regulars. The opponents began a "Race to the Dan": Greene's council of war recommended continuing the retreat, opting to fight at a future date and location.

By 14 February, Greene's army was safely across the Dan after a retreat that was, according to British commander Banastre Tarleton, "judiciously designed and vigorously executed." Cornwallis was 240 miles (390 km) from his supply base at Camden, South Carolina. He established camp at Hillsborough and attempted to forage for supplies and recruit Loyalists. Though Greene's army enjoyed an abundance of food in Halifax County, Virginia, Cornwallis found a "scarcity of provisions," resorted to plundering the farms of the local inhabitants, and lost men "...in consequence of their Straggling out of Camp in search of whiskey."

On 19 February, Greene sent Lee's Legion on a reconnaissance mission south across the Dan. By then, according to author and historian John Buchanan, "Buford's Massacre inflamed rebel passions. Pyle's Massacre devastated Tory (Loyalist) morale." On 22 February Greene moved his army south across the Dan. On 25 February, forced to abandon Hillsborough, Cornwallis moved his camp to the south of Alamance Creek between the Haw River and the Deep River. Greene camped on the north side of the creek, within 15 miles (24 km) of Cornwallis's camp.

By 6 March Cornwallis's men suffered from hunger. His men plundered local inhabitants regardless of their political allegiances, and desertions rose, forcing Cornwallis to seek a definitive battle with Greene. Cornwallis had lost almost 400 men through disease, desertion or death, reducing his strength to about 2,000 men. On 10 March Greene was joined by North Carolina militia, led by John Butler and Thomas Eaton, and Virginia militia, led by Robert Lawson. On 12 March Greene marched his army of about 4,440, 1,762 of whom were Continentals, to Guilford Court House.

On 15 March Cornwallis, after learning of Greene's location, marched down the road from New Garden toward Guilford Court House. The advance guard of both armies met near the Quaker New Garden Meeting House, 4 miles (6.4 km) west of Guilford Court House. Greene had sent Lee's Legion and William Campbell's Virginia riflemen to reconnoiter Cornwallis' camp. At 2 am the Patriots noticed Tarleton's movements, and at 4 am Lee's and Tarleton's men made contact. Tarleton started a retreat, while suffering a musket wound to the right hand, and as Lee pursued, Lee came in contact with the British Guards, who forced Lee to retreat.

== Battle ==
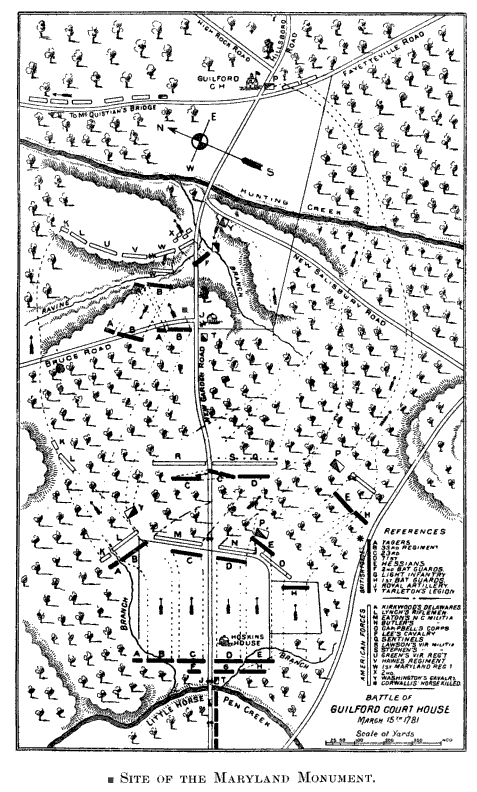
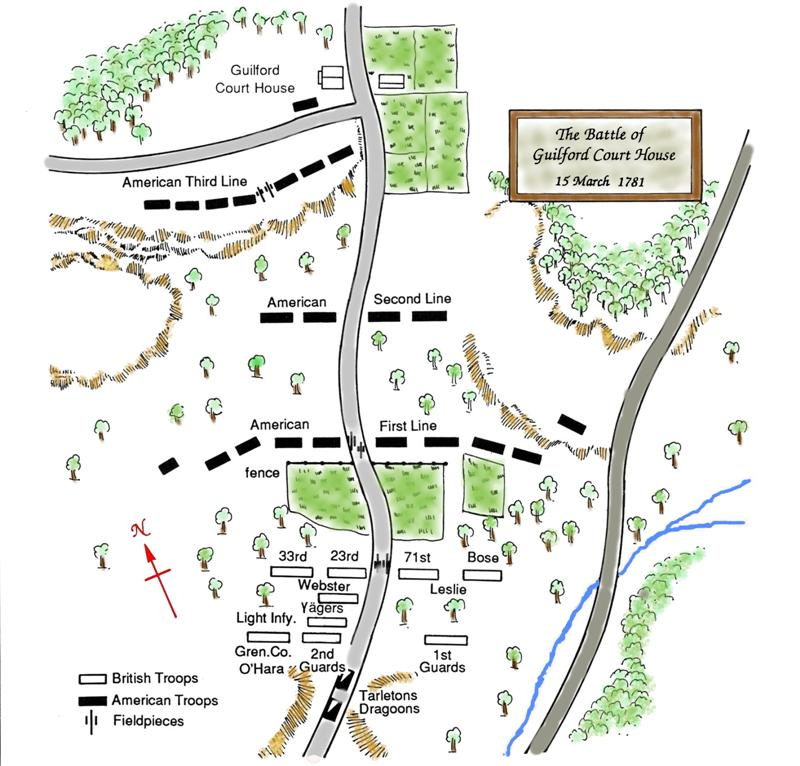
An 1893 map of the battlefield, Guilford Courthouse battleground company (left). A map of the Guilford Court House Battleground, based on a 2006 National Park Service map (right).

Greene had deployed his army in three lines. Greene's first line was along a split-rail fence, where the New Camden road emerged from the woods. On the right was Butler's regiment of 500 North Carolina militia, plus Charles Lynch's 200 Virginia riflemen, William Washington's 90 dragoons, and Robert Kirkwood's 80 man Delaware Line. On the left was Eaton's regiment of 500 North Carolina militia, along with William Campbell's 200 riflemen, and Lee's Legion of 75 horse and 82 foot. In the middle was a dual six-pounder battery led by Anthony Singleton.

Greene's second line was 350 yards (320 m) behind the first: 1,200 Virginia militia, led by Robert Lawson and Edward Stevens. Greene's third line was another 550 yards (500 m) to the right rear, in a clearing: 1,400 Continentals, including Isaac Huger's Virginia Brigade, Otho Holland Williams's Maryland Brigade, and Peter Jacquett's Delaware Company. Between the Virginia and Maryland units was a battery of two six-pounders, led by Samuel Finley.

Cornwallis's column appeared along the New Camden Road at 1:30 pm, and Singleton commenced firing his two six-pounders, while John Macleod's Royal Artillery battery responded with three six-pounders. According to Buchanan, Cornwallis "...did not know how many men Greene had. He was ignorant of the terrain too, he also lacked intelligence on Greene's dispositions. Cornwallis "...had marched hundreds of miles, had driven his army to rags and hunger...".

Cornwallis deployed the 33rd Foot and Royal Welsh Fusiliers on his left wing, led by James Webster, and supported by Charles O'Hara with his 2nd Guards Battalion, Grenadiers, and the Jägers. Cornwallis's right wing, led by Alexander Leslie, included the 2nd Battalion of Fraser's Highlanders and Hessian Regiment von Bose, supported by the 1st Guards Battalion. Tarleton's British Legion was in reserve, but Cornwallis otherwise lacked Loyalist troops.

The British moved forward. The North Carolina militia, according to Singleton, "contrary to custom, behaved well for militia" and fired their volley. Captain Dugald Stuart noted, "One half of the Highlanders dropt on that spot." Thomas Saumarez called it a "most galling and destructive fire." As the British advanced, Sergeant Roger Lamb noted, "...within forty yards of the enemy's line it was perceived that their whole line had their arms presented, and resting on a rail fence...They were taking aim with nice precision. At this awful moment, a general pause took place...then Colonel Webster rode forward in front of the 23rd regiment and said...'Come on, my brave Fuzileers.' This operated like an inspiring voice...".

As instructed by Greene, the North Carolina militia retired through Greene's second line. The British now came under enfilading fire from the riflemen and Continentals on their flanks, forcing Cornwallis to order forward his supporting units. On Greene's left, Lee's Legion and Campbell's Virginians retired in a northeasterly direction, instead of straight back, resulting in their fight with the Regiment von Bose and the 1st Guards Battalion—a backwoods fight a mile from the main fighting.

As the British moved through the woods, the contest reduced to small firefights as the British forced the Virginians back. Cornwallis, despite having a horse shot from under him, led the British clearing of the woods. The British then faced the Continentals in Greene's third line. James Webster led the first British units out of the woods—the Jägers, the light infantry of the Guards, and the 33rd Foot—in a charge against the Continentals. The British were able to come within a 100 feet (30 m) before they were repulsed by the Continental volley of the 1st Maryland and Delaware companies. However, as the 2nd Guards cleared the woods, they forced the 2nd Maryland to run and captured Finley's two six-pounders. The 1st Maryland then turned and engaged the 2nd Guards. William Washington's dragoons charged through the rear of the 2nd Guards, turned, and charged through the 2nd Guards a second time. A 1st Maryland bayonet charge followed Washington. Cornwallis then ordered Macleod to fire grapeshot into the mass of fighting men. The grape killed Americans and British but cleared the field of both. Cornwallis then advanced toward the gap left by the 2nd Maryland. At 3:30 pm Greene ordered his troops to withdraw under covering fire by the 4th Virginians. Cornwallis initially ordered a pursuit but recalled his men. In the words of Buchanan, "...reduced to slightly over 1400 effectives...Cornwallis, had ruined his army."

== Aftermath ==
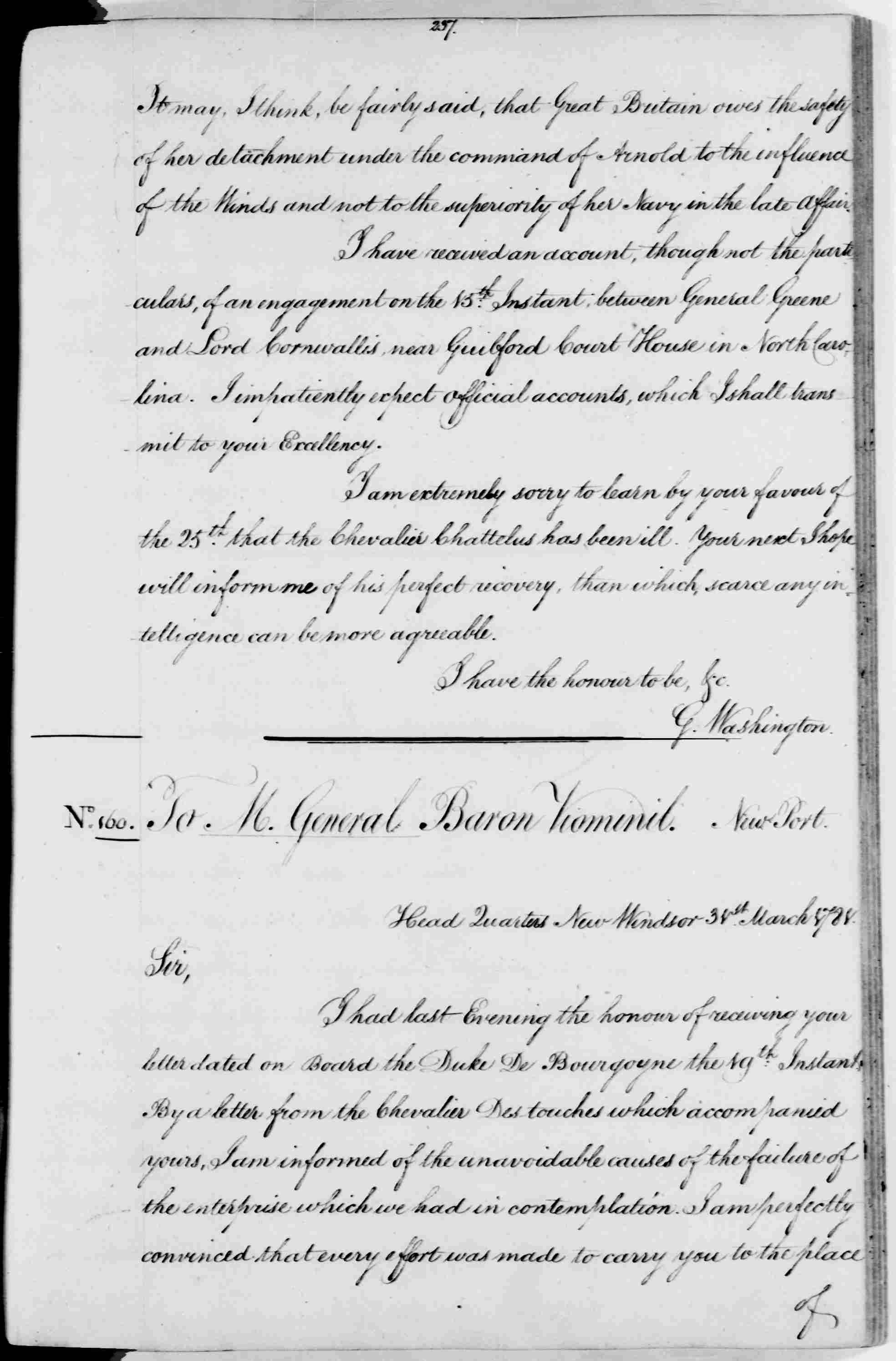
Letter from George Washington to the Comte de Rochambeau (31 March 1781), in which Washington reports he is hearing first reports from the Battle of Guilford Court House

The battle lasted 90 minutes. The British engaged half as many as the Americans yet won possession of the battlefield. However, almost a quarter of the British became casualties. The Americans withdrew intact, which accomplished Greene's primary objective. The British, by holding ground with their usual tenacity despite fewer troops, were victorious. However, Cornwallis suffered unsustainable casualties and subsequently withdrew to the coast to re-group, leaving the Americans with the strategic advantage. Seeing the Guilford battle as a classic Pyrrhic victory, British Whig Party leader and war critic Charles James Fox echoed Plutarch's famous quotation of Pyrrhus by saying, "Another such victory would ruin the British Army!"

In a letter to Lord George Germain, Cornwallis commented: "From our observation, and the best accounts we could procure, we did not doubt but the strength of the enemy exceeded 7,000 men...I cannot ascertain the loss of the enemy, but it must have been considerable; between 200 and 300 dead were left on the field of battle...many of their wounded escaped...Our forage parties have reported to me that houses in a circle six to eight miles around us are full of others...We took few prisoners."

Cornwallis wrote about the British force, "The conduct and actions of the officers and soldiers that composed this little army will do more justice to their merit than I can by words. Their persevering intrepidity in action, their invincible patience in the hardships and fatigues of a march of above 600 miles, in which they have forded several large rivers and numberless creeks, many of which would be reckoned large rivers in any other country in the world, without tents or covering against the climate, and often without provisions, will sufficiently manifest their ardent zeal for the honour and interests of their Sovereign and their country."

After the battle, the British occupied a large expanse of woodland that offered no food or sufficient shelter, and the night brought torrential rains. Fifty of the wounded died before sunrise. Had the British followed the retreating rebels, the redcoats might have come across the rebel baggage and supply wagons, which remained where the Americans had camped on the west bank of the Salisbury road prior to the battle. On March 17, two days after the battle, Cornwallis reported his casualties as 3 officers and 88 men of other ranks killed, and 24 officers and 384 men of other ranks wounded, with a further 25 men missing in action. Webster was wounded during the battle and died two weeks later. Tarleton was also wounded, losing two fingers from taking a bullet in his right hand.

Greene reported his casualties as 57 killed, 111 wounded, and 161 missing among the Continental troops, and 22 killed, 74 wounded, and 885 missing for the militia—a total of 79 killed, 185 wounded, and 1,046 missing. Of those reported missing, 75 were wounded men who were captured by the British. When Cornwallis resumed his march, he left these 75 wounded prisoners at Cross Creek, having earlier left 70 of his own most severely wounded men at the Quaker settlement of New Garden near Snow Camp. An analysis of Revolutionary pension records by Lawrence E. Babits and Joshua B. Howard led the authors to conclude that Greene's killed and wounded at the Battle were "probably 15-20 percent higher than shown by official returns," with a likely "90-94 killed and 211-220 wounded." Apart from the wounded prisoners, most of the other men returned as 'missing' were North Carolina militiamen who returned to their homes after the battle.

To avoid another Camden, Greene retreated with his forces intact. With his small army, fewer than 2,000, Cornwallis declined to follow Greene into the backcountry. Retiring to Hillsborough, Cornwallis raised the royal standard, offered protection to Loyalists, and for the moment appeared to be master of Georgia and the Carolinas. In a few weeks, however, he abandoned the heart of the region and marched to the coast at Wilmington, North Carolina, where he could recruit and refit his army. At Wilmington Cornwallis faced a serious problem. Instead of remaining in North Carolina, he wished to march into Virginia, justifying the move on the grounds that until he occupied Virginia he could not firmly hold the more southerly states he had just overrun. General Henry Clinton sharply criticized the decision as unmilitary and as having been made contrary to his instructions. To Cornwallis he wrote in May: "Had you intimated the probability of your intention, I should certainly have endeavoured to stop you, as I did then, as well as now, consider such a move likely to be dangerous to our interests in the Southern Colonies." For three months, Cornwallis raided every farm or plantation he came across, from which he took hundreds of horses for his dragoons. He converted another 700 infantry to mounted troops. During these raids, he freed thousands of slaves, of whom 12,000 joined his own force.

General Greene boldly pushed toward Camden and Charleston, South Carolina, with a view to drawing Cornwallis to the points where he was the year before, as well as driving back Lord Rawdon, whom Cornwallis had left in that field. In his main object—the recovery of the southern states—Greene succeeded by the close of the year, but not without hard fighting and reverses. Greene said, "We fight, get beat, rise, and fight again."

== Legacy ==
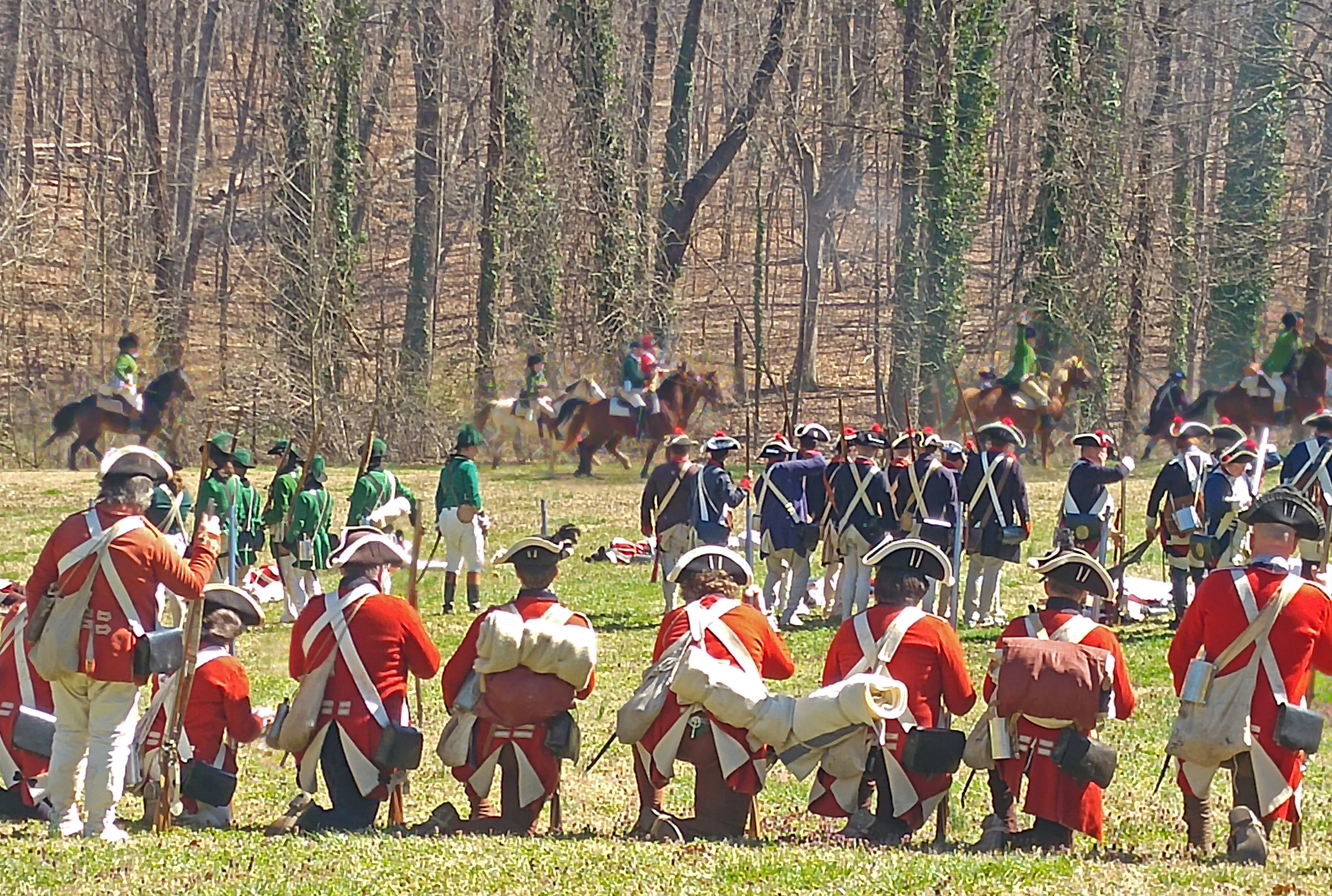
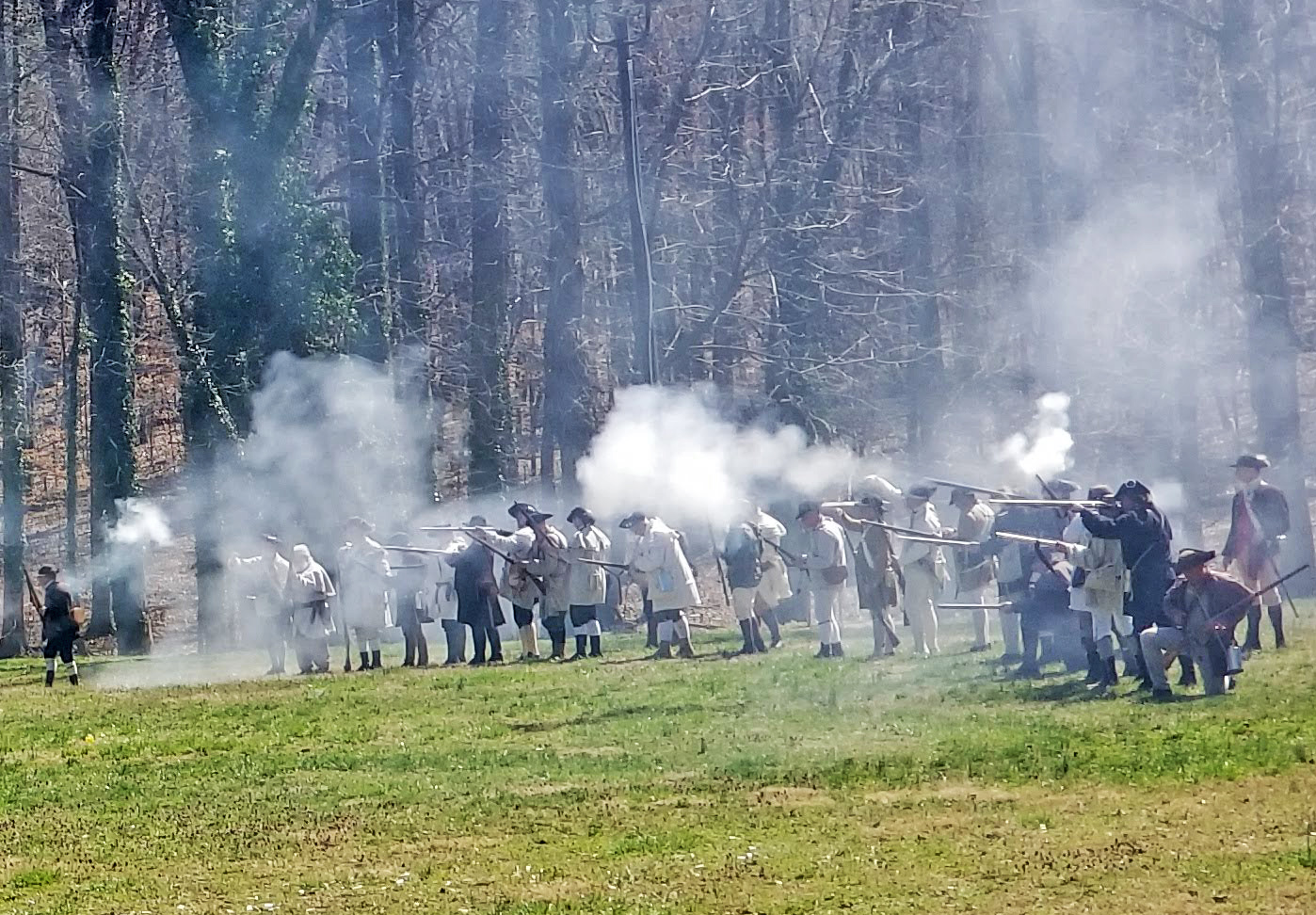
Battle reenactment 2019

Every year on or about March 15, re-enactors in period uniforms present a tactical demonstration of Revolutionary War fighting techniques on or near the battle site, major portions of which are preserved in the Guilford Courthouse National Military Park, established in 1917. Recent research has shown that the battlefield extended into the area now within the boundaries of the adjacent Greensboro Country Park to the east. The American Battlefield Trust and its partners have saved more than an acre of the battlefield at the site of the British attack on the first line and have turned the land over to the National Park Service for inclusion in the national park. In 2016 a Crown Forces Monument was opened at the Guilford Courthouse National Military Park in honor of the officers and men of Cornwallis's army.

Three current Army National Guard units (116th IN, 175th IN and 198th SIG) are derived from American units that participated in the Battle of Guilford Courthouse. There are only thirty Army National Guard and active Regular Army units with lineages that go back to the colonial era.

The town of Gilford, New Hampshire, despite a clerical error in the spelling, is named after the battle. A New Hampshire historical marker there, number 118, commemorates the naming.

== See also ==
- American Revolutionary War § War in the South. Places the Battle of Guilford Court House in overall sequence and strategic context.
- Snow Camp Outdoor Theater which tells some of the story of the aftermath of the battle through the play The Sword of Peace by William Hardy.
