= Hoskins House Historic District =

Historic house in North Carolina, United States

- U.S. National Register of Historic Places
- U.S. Historic district
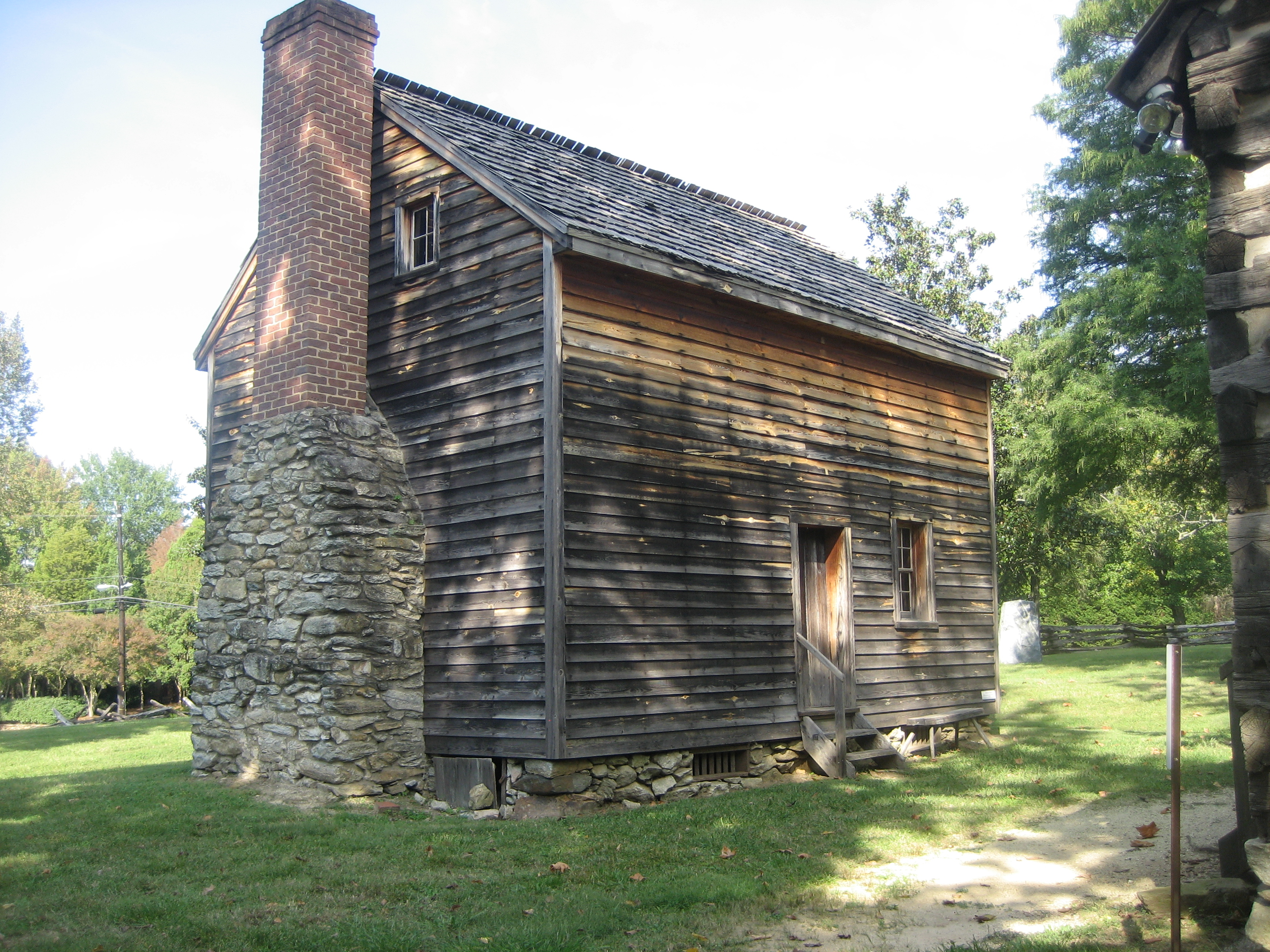
- Hoskins House, September 2012

- Location within North Carolina Location within the United States
- Location: Intersection of New Garden Rd. and US 220, Greensboro, North Carolina
- Coordinates: 36°7′47.31″N 79°51′8.279″W
- Area: 7.5 acres (3.0 ha)
- Built: 1781
- Architectural style: Log cabin style
- NRHP reference No.: 88000175
- Added to NRHP: March 15, 1988

Hoskins House Historic District, also known as Tannenbaum Park, is a historic log cabin and national historic district located at Greensboro, Guilford County, North Carolina. The Hoskins House is a late-18th or early-19th century chestnut log dwelling house measuring 24 feet by 18 feet. It has an interior enclosed stair and exterior stone chimney. The house was restored in 1986–1987. Also on the property is the contributing Coble Barn (c 1830). It is a large double-pen log barn of hewn V-notched logs under a long wood-shingled gable roof. The barn was moved to and restored at its current location in 1987. The Hoskins House site was the focal point of the British attack during the Battle of Guilford Court House on March 15, 1781. The Hoskins property survives today as an important satellite to the Guilford Courthouse National Military Park.

It was listed on the National Register of Historic Places in 1988.
