= Guilford Courthouse National Military Park =

National military park in Greensboro, North Carolina

- IUCN category III (natural monument or feature)
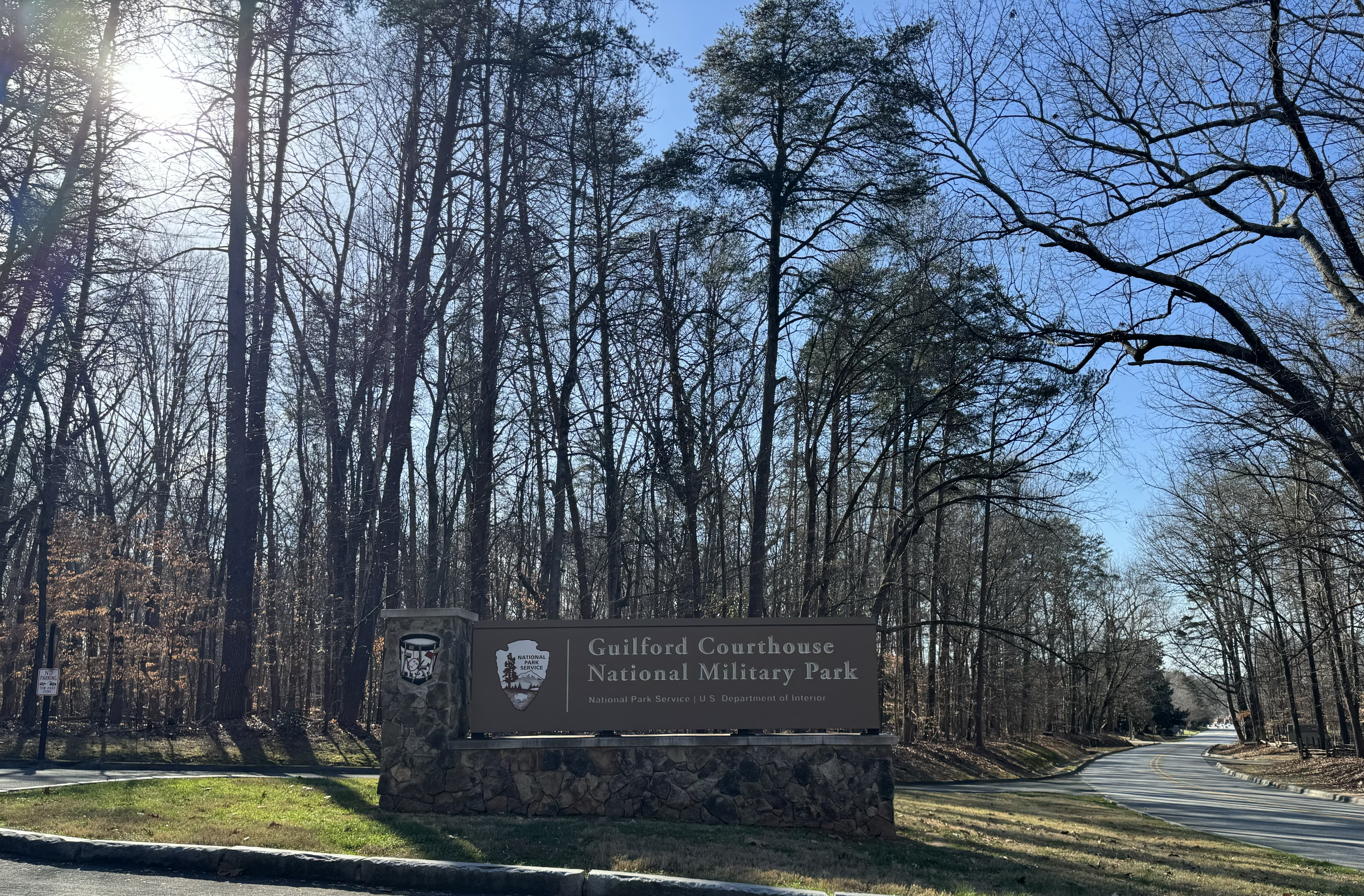
- Entrance to the park.

- Location within North Carolina Location within the United States
- Location: Greensboro, North Carolina, USA
- Nearest city: Greensboro, NC
- Coordinates: 36°7′53″N 79°50′47″W
- Area: 253.54 acres (102.60 ha)
- Established: March 2, 1917
- Visitors: 449,802 (in 2025)
- Governing body: National Park Service
- Website: Guilford Courthouse National Military Park
- Guilford Courthouse National Military Park
- U.S. National Register of Historic Places
- U.S. National Historic Landmark District
- Nearest city: Greensboro, North Carolina
- Architects: National Park Service; Bureau of Public Roads
- Architectural style: Colonial Revival
- NRHP reference No.: 66000069

Significant dates
- Added to NRHP: October 15, 1966
- Designated NHLD: January 3, 2001

Guilford Courthouse National Military Park, at 2332 New Garden Road in Greensboro, Guilford County, North Carolina, commemorates the Battle of Guilford Court House, fought on March 15, 1781. This battle opened the campaign that led to American victory in the Revolutionary War. Though they won the battle, the casualties suffered by the British in this battle contributed to their surrender at Yorktown seven months later. The battlefield is preserved as a National Military Park and operated by the National Park Service (NPS). Based on research of historical evidence, the interpretation of the battle has changed since the late 20th century, which will affect the placement of monuments and markers.

== Battlefield preservation ==
In 1886, local resident David Schenck initiated plans to gain control of the land to commemorate the Guilford Courthouse battleground as a park. The following year, he chartered the non-profit Guilford Battle Ground Company (GBGC) to advance such efforts. From an early date, he planned on the group's donating the property it purchased to the federal government. When the US Congress finally established Guilford Courthouse as a national military park in 1917, the GBGC turned over its 125 acres (0.51 km^{2}) at no charge. Without David Schenck's generosity, it is entirely possible that the park would not exist today.

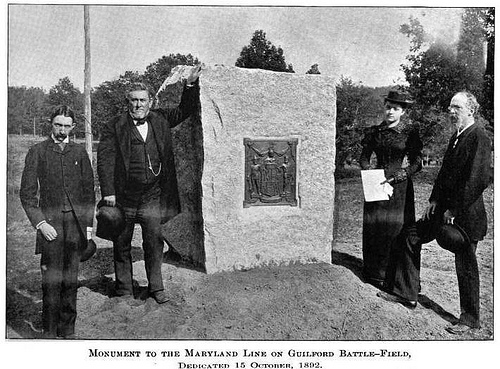
Dedication of Monument to members of the Maryland Line at the Battle of Guilford Court House, Maryland Historical Society, 15 October 1892

Although generous in starting the park, the years of control by the GBGC left a mixed legacy. First, Schenck did not preserve the terrain in its approximate historical state, but beautified the landscape for a pleasing experience. Before the grounds were established as a military park, state historical societies began to erect monuments in the area purchased by the GBGC. Although well-meant, these monuments and interpretations were not based on researched evidence and were often constructed in convenient, if inaccurate, locations.

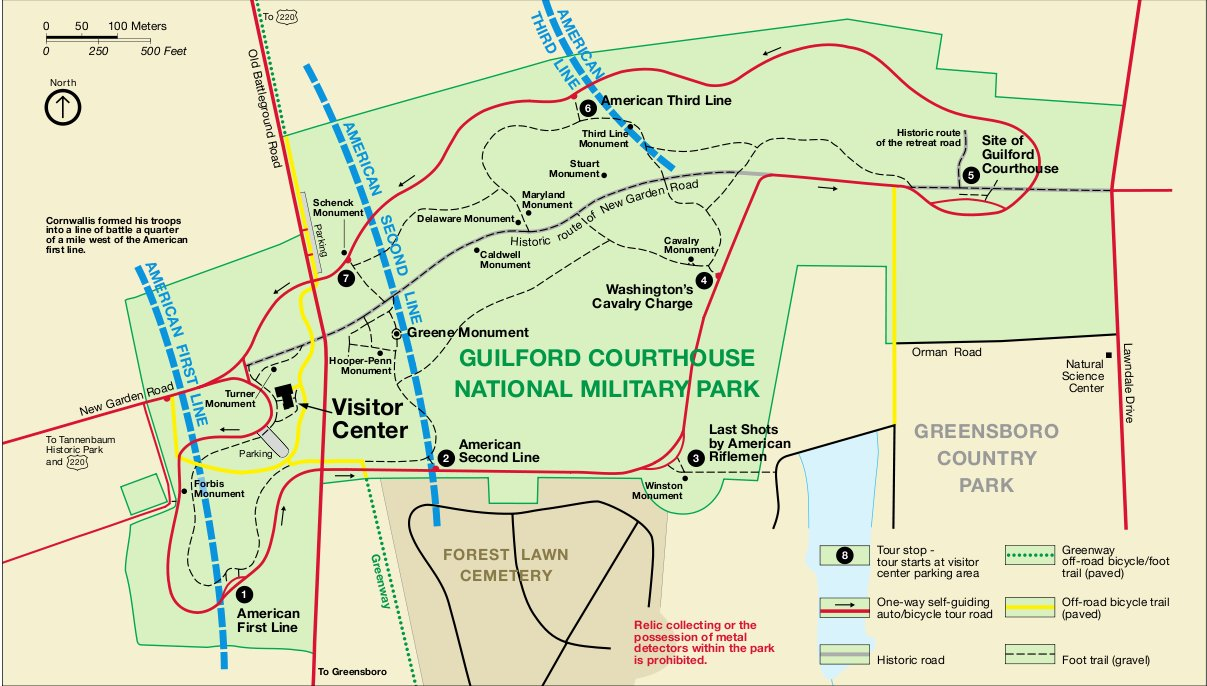
Contrasting National Park Service maps reflect the changing official historiography of the battle. This 1998 map still adheres to the interpretation based on Schenck.

Second, he adopted an interpretation of the battle that encompassed a much smaller area than is indicated by contemporary accounts. Historians believe his limited funds, coupled with landowners' demanding top dollar, influenced his interpretation. This misled researchers and historical groups who relied on his work; they placed historical monuments and markers in the wrong spots. It also hampered government efforts to acquire land or resist development in areas outside the original area designated as a battleground by Schenck. Since his time, the expanding city of Greensboro approached and encircled the park with private development, destroying some battlefield areas. When the National Park Service assumed responsibility for the park, their historians and researchers sought to clarify the accuracy of the locations of the battle. The renewed accuracy places many of the monuments in locations that had very little reference to the actual battle.

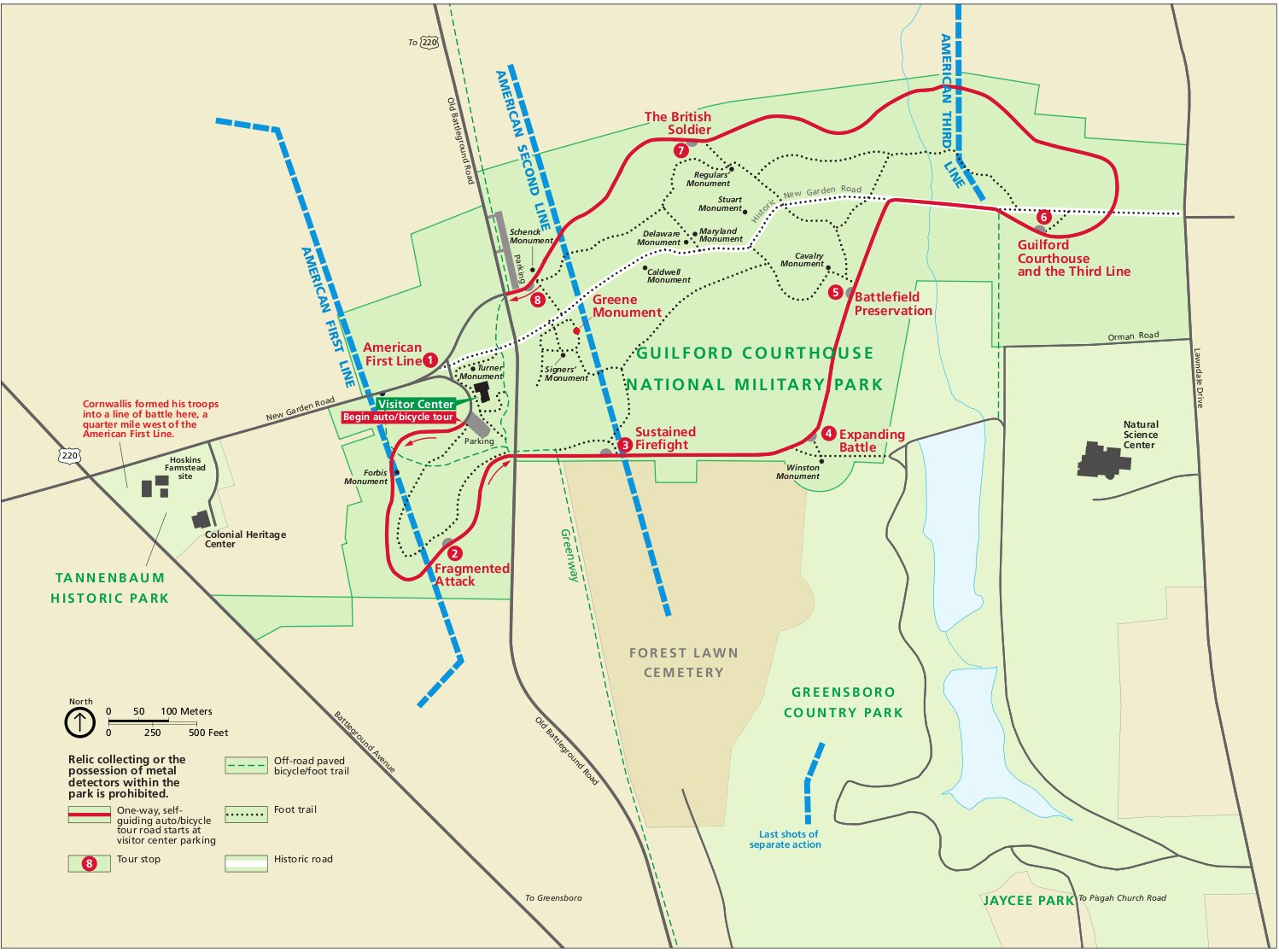
A current map shows a larger battlefield. In particular, the American third line has been moved back, and the last shots of the battle have been placed further south, in Greensboro Country Park.

Today, the National Park Service has moved beyond Schenck's interpretation of the battle with a more researched understanding of the battle's events. It hopes to reconstruct the battlefield and its monuments to be consistent with historical evidence. A revived Guilford Battleground Company supports preservation efforts for Guilford Courthouse National Military Park and Colonial Heritage Center, where British forces assembled for their advance.

The park is linked by a bicycle path to the adjoining Greensboro Country Park, and residents use both for jogging and cycling.

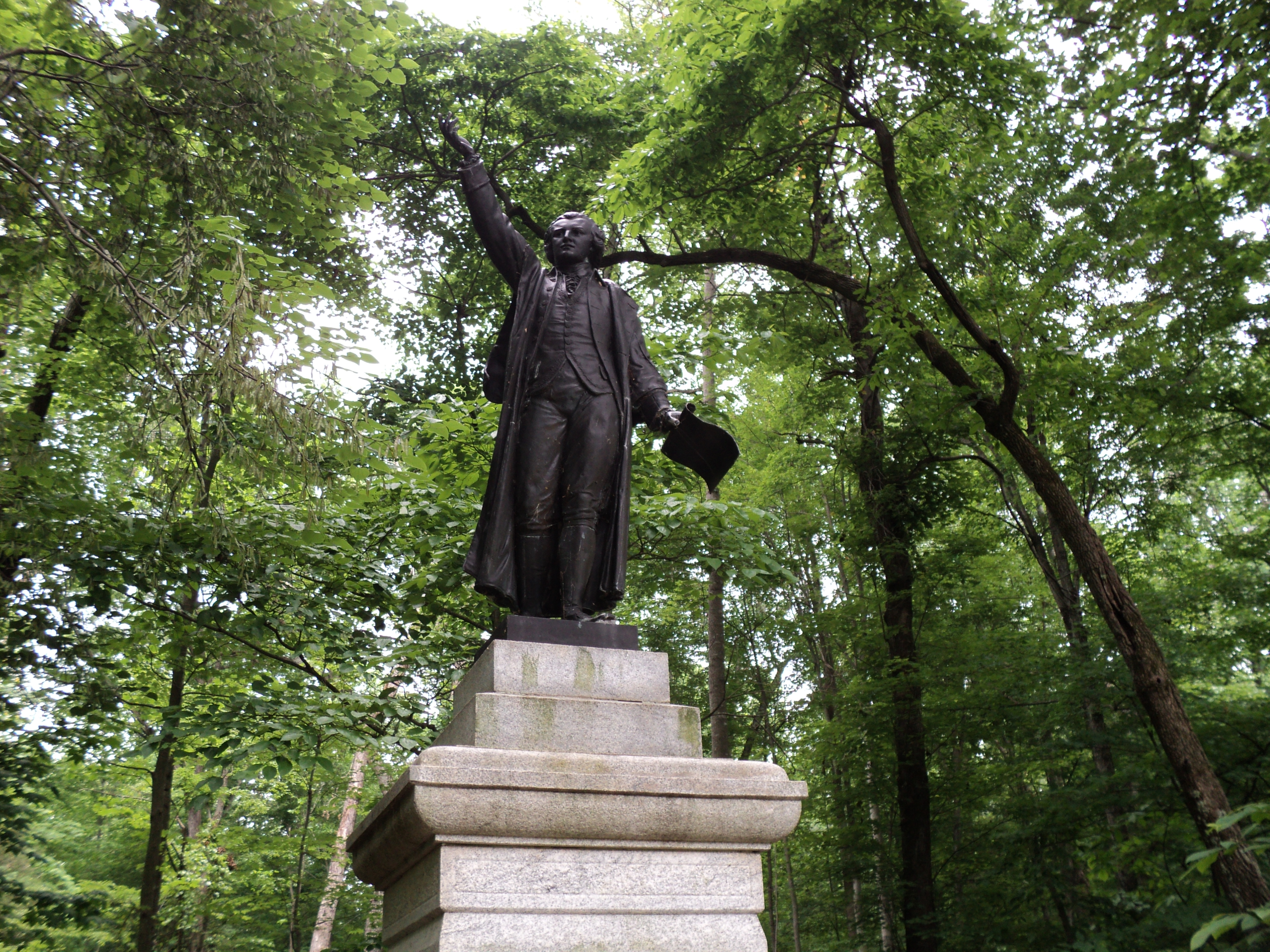
William Hooper, signer of the Declaration of Independence monument

== Administrative history ==
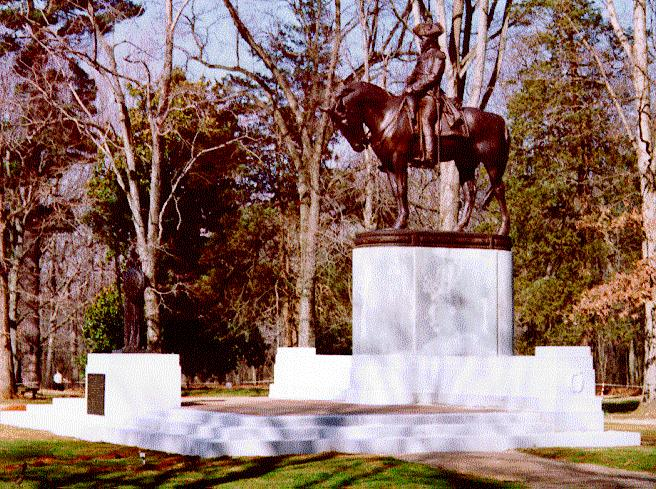
Nathanael Greene Monument at Guilford Courthouse National Military Park

The military park was established on March 2, 1917. It was transferred from the War Department to the National Park Service on August 10, 1933. As with all historic areas administered by the National Park Service, the military park was listed on the National Register of Historic Places in 1966, when it was established. The park's nomination was substantially updated in 1996, and in 2001 it was designated a National Historic Landmark.

== See also ==
- Battle of Guilford Court House
- Guilford Court House, North Carolina
- Hoskins House Historic District
- List of National Historic Landmarks in North Carolina
- National Register of Historic Places listings in Guilford County, North Carolina

== Sources ==
- The National Parks: Index 2001-2003. Washington: U.S. Department of the Interior.
- Redeemed From Oblivion: An Administrative History of Guilford Courthouse National Military Park. (1995) Washington: U.S. Department of the Interior.
