= 6th Maryland Regiment =

- Active: 1776–1783
- Allegiance: Continental Congress of the United States
- Type: Infantry
- Size: 728 soldiers(1776) re-organized to 611 soldiers (1781)
- Part of: Maryland Line
- Engagements: Monmouth, Battle of Camden, Guilford Court House, Battle of Brandywine, Battle of Germantown

Commanders
- Notable commanders: Colonel Otho H. Williams General Mordecai Gist Brigadier General Philippe Hubert Preudhomme de Borre

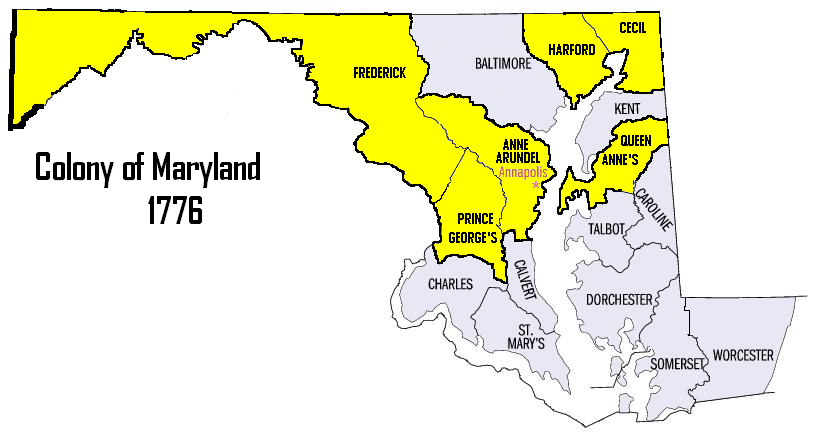
Recruitment Areas

The 6th Maryland Regiment, active from 27 March 1776—January 1, 1783, is most notable for its involvement during the American Revolutionary War (1775 - 1783). An infantry type regiment consisting of 728 soldiers, the 6th Maryland was composed of eight companies of volunteers from Prince Georges, Queen Anne's, Fredrick, Cecil, Harford, and Ann Arundel counties in the colony of Maryland

On 22 May 1777, the regiment was assigned to the 2nd Maryland Brigade. It was re-organized to nine companies on 12 May 1779 and reassigned to the Southern Department on 5 April 1780.

== Background ==
Since the establishment of the American colonies, the British Navy protected the developing colonies, and the colonist paid taxes to the crown through import and export tariffs, taxes, and when requested, raised armies for London. This laissez-faire system where the colonist had a large degree of self-rule worked until 1763, when the British government decided that it needed to raise capital to pay off debt accrued through the French and Indian war, and the more encompassing Seven Years' War. In the minds of the British, the colonist ought to pay a significant portion of the debt as the war benefited the Americans by removing the threat of Indians and French colonist from their lands. Without consultation, Parliament passed the Sugar Act 1764, and taxed molasses at three pence per gallon to collect revenue and pay off debts. The colonist felt as though this tax was unwarranted and that parliament should not burden the Americans with the cost of something they didn't need: a British army.

In 1765, Parliament further alienated its colonies when Prime Minister Grenville introduced the Stamp Act 1765. What made the Sugar Act and the Stamp Act so unprecedented and subject to popular disdain was that it was the first direct tax on the colonies.

To gain more control in the region, especially after New York disregarded the Mutiny Act, Parliament created the American Board of Customs, designed to efficiently collect taxes, specifically those proposed by Prime Minister Townshend. However, this inspired John Dickinson to write Letters from a Farmer in Pennsylvania that argued there should be no taxation without representation and further boycotts of British goods.

After several brouhahas and altercations between American colonist and British civil servants, Parliament made the decision to station British soldiers in Boston. For many this action was an unacceptable infringement on their English Bill of rights and on 5 March 1770, British soldiers opened fire and killed twelve Bostonians. While there were wildly different accounts of the situation, with one anonymous person stating that the shooting was deliberate, and Captain Preston – the commanding officer - stating the shooting was an accident, the result was the same. The Boston Massacre solidified American hatred of the British, and paved the way towards independence.

The American Revolutionary War began in on 19 April 1775, when the Massachusetts Militia engaged the British army at the battles of Lexington and Concord, in Middlesex County. This prompted the newly formed first Continental Congress to authorized and appointed General George Washington to both take charge of the existing militia and for the creation of an entirely new Continental Army.

== History ==
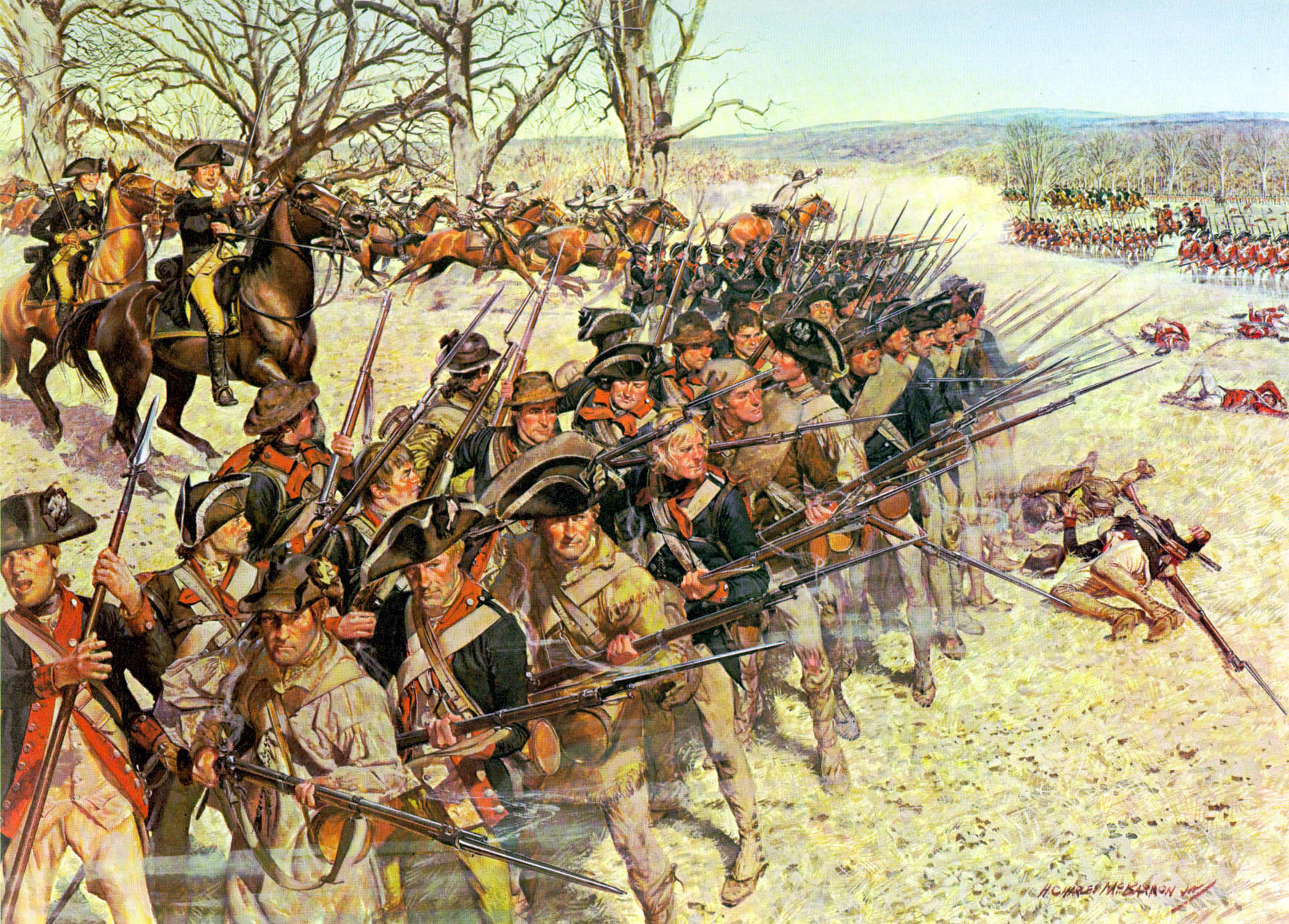
An example of the Maryland Line fighting at the Battle of Guilford Courthouse.

In June 1775, the Second Continental Congress authorized the formation of a "Maryland Line", an entire militia composed and financed by Maryland to be incorporated into the newly formed Continental Army. On 18 January 1776, the Maryland government carried out the orders of the Second Continental Congress and created the following regiments:

- 1st Maryland Regiment, disbanded in 1783
- 2nd Maryland Regiment, disbanded in 1783
- 3rd Maryland Regiment, disbanded in 1783
- 4th Maryland Regiment, disbanded in 1783
- 5th Maryland Regiment, disbanded in 1783
- 6th Maryland Regiment, disbanded in 1783
- 7th Maryland Regiment, disbanded in 1781
- German Battalion (counted as half a regiment against the quota), disbanded in 1781
- Maryland and Virginia Rifle Regiment (counted as half a regiment against the quota), disbanded in 1781
- 2nd Independent Maryland Company – Somerset County absorbed into the 2nd Maryland Regiment in 1781

Once Maryland met its required quota of composing and equipping eight regiments, the units were formally incorporated into the Continental Army to fight aside militia from the twelve other states. The 6th Maryland Regiment was incorporated into the Continental Army on 27 March 1776.

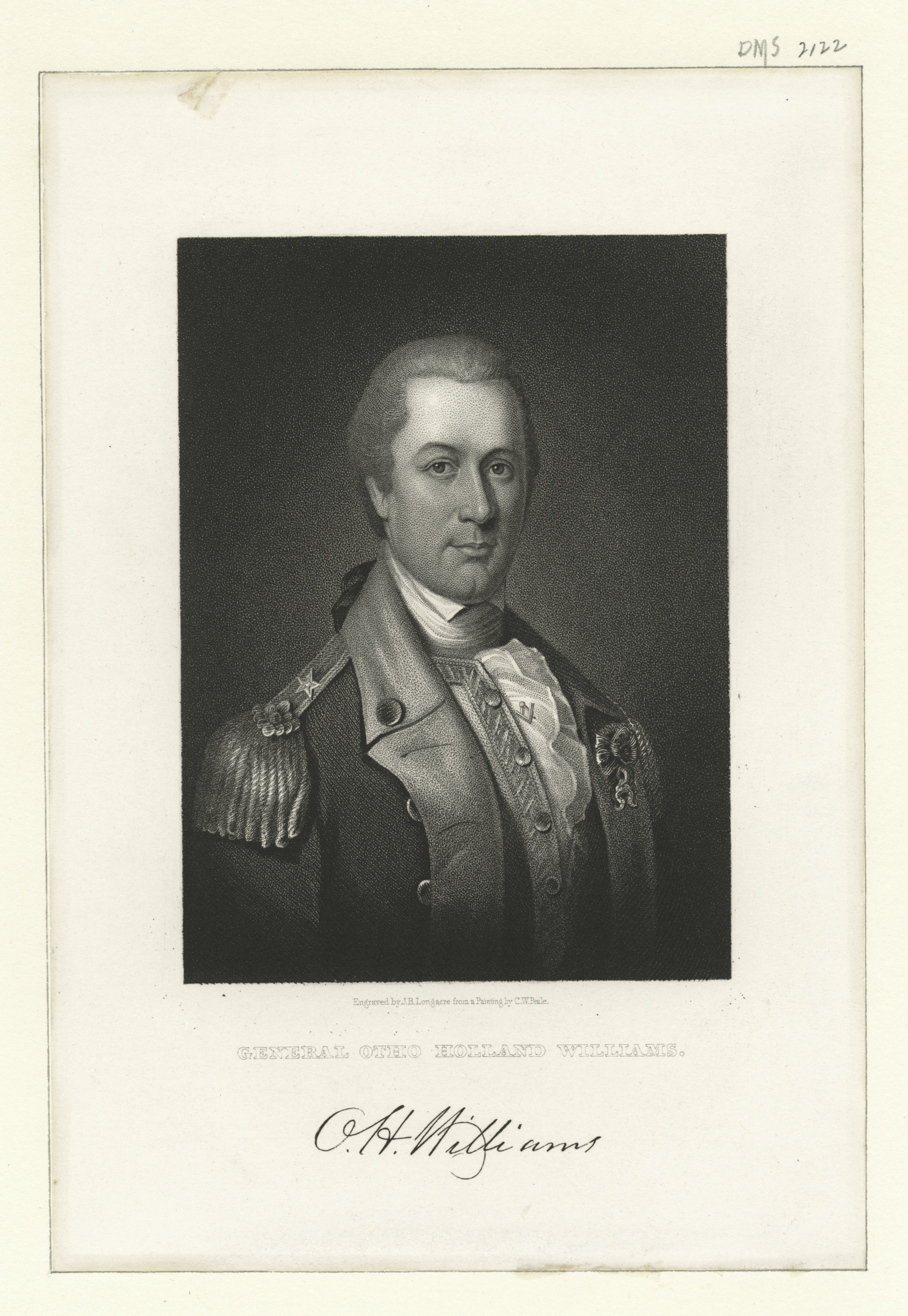
Otho Holland Williams (1749-1794). Colonel of the 6th Maryland Regiment during the American Revolutionary War.

An important member of the 6th Maryland Regiment, was officer Otho Holland Williams. Contributing as a Colonel to the regiment. During his service he was promoted multiple times.

== Action seen ==
=== Battle of Brandywine ===
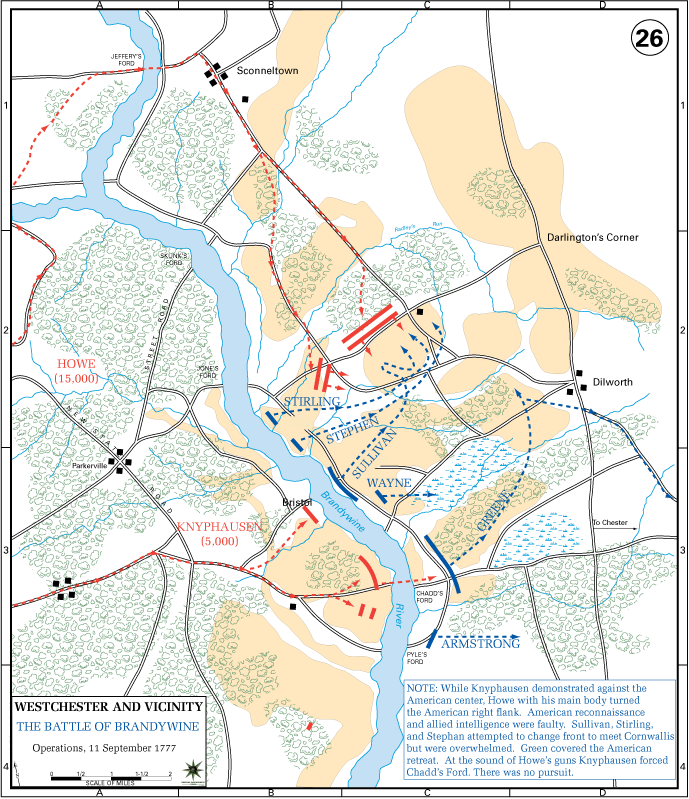
Battle of Brandywine

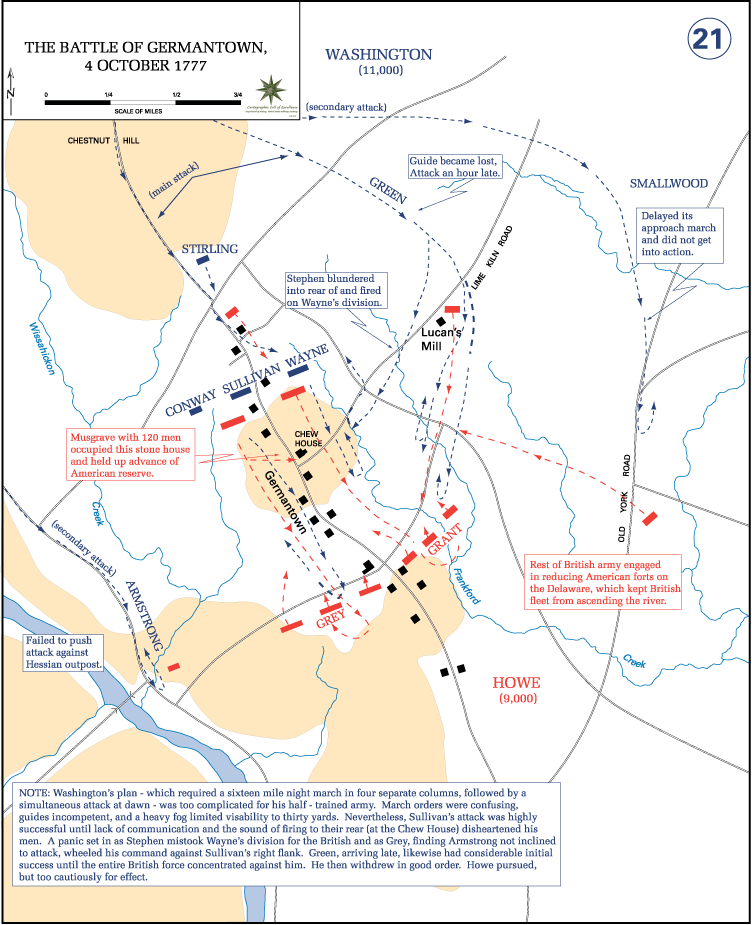
Battle of Germantown

Fought on 11 September 1777 at Chadds Ford Township in Delaware County, Pennsylvania, the large-scale military battle saw action between the Continental army led by General George Washington and the British army led by General Sir William Howe. The overall objective for the American forces was to stop British advancement and prevent the takeover of Philadelphia. Despite both armies having similar strength - both around 15,000 men – General Howe was able to flank Washington's army and force an American retreat. The overall battle lasted a record 11 hours and resulted in the loss of around 1,900 men: 1,300 from the Continental army and 600 from the British Army.

The Maryland 6th Regiment entered the theater of war for the first time at the Battle of Brandywine as part of the 2nd Maryland Brigade led by Brigadier General Chevalier Philippe Hubert Preudhomme de Borre. This Brigade in conjunction with the 1st Maryland brigade, 3rd Virginia Brigade, 4th Virginia Brigade, New Jersey Brigade and the 3rd Pennsylvania Brigade formed a Division of 1,100 men led by Major General John Sullivan, known during the battle as Sullivan's Wing.

Originally stationed northwards along the banks of the Brandywine River, Sullivan's Wing was ordered to prevent any British crossing. However, after British forces led by General Cornwallis flanked the Continental Army, Sullivan's Wing, and thus the 6th Maryland Regiment, was ordered to march north along with Stirling's Wing and Stephen's Wing to stymie Cornwallis's advancements and allow for an American retreat.

=== Battle of Germantown ===
Fought on 4 October 1777, in Germantown, Pennsylvania between George Washington's Continental army and General William Howe's British forces, this battle occurred shortly after the Battle of Brandywine and solidified British control of Philadelphia.

Originally the plan, drawn up by Washington himself, called for a four prong attack on Germantown in which Sullivan's wing, and the 6th Maryland, would take the center-right column and directly assault the camp. However, due to a thick fog, Sullivan's wing was unable to properly navigate and became trapped in the line of fire from a heavily fortified mansion. The Maryland Regiment ultimately ran out of ammunition along with the rest of the wing, and was forced to retreat. This initial retreat led to an eventual army wide retreat in which, coupled with the battle, 152 American soldiers died. The British were able to keep Philadelphia and the Americans were forced to set up winter camp at Valley Forge.

=== Battle of Monmouth ===
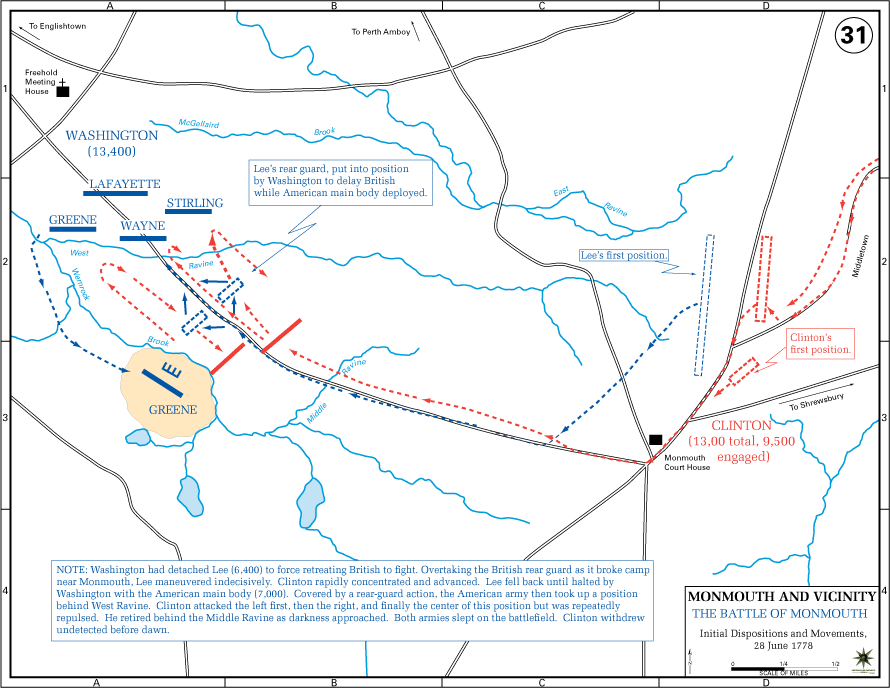
Battle of Monmouth

Fought on 28 June 1778, at Monmouth Court House, New Jersey, between George Washington's Continental army and Lieutenant General Henry Clinton's British forces, initiated by Washington, the primary objective was for the American forces to attack the rear of Clinton's army as the British left the courthouse for redeployment in New York. The overall battle was inconclusive in terms of strategic advantage, but the American forces suffered twice as many casualties as their British opponents, due to a disorganized American attack followed by a swift British counterattack.

During this battle, the 6th Maryland Regiment was led by the notorious Colonel Otho Holland Williams. Moreover, the 6th Maryland fought alongside the 4th Maryland Regiment and the 2nd Maryland Regiment to make up the 2nd Maryland Brigade. This brigade, along with six other brigades made up Major General Nathanael Greene's Right Wing which was tasked to enfilade Clinton's forces.

=== Battle of Camden ===
Fought on 16 August 1780, in Kershaw County, South Carolina by Lieutenant General Charles Cornwallis commanding the British army, and Major General Horatio Gates commanding the American army, the battle was a British victory and led to further British control of the Carolinas.

The original American objective was to capture the crossing at Camden as it was a strategic route in taking back control of the South. Gates decided to break up his 3,700 troops into two columns with the 2nd Maryland regiment commanded by Mordecai Gist as the right flank, and the unproven North Carolina regiment as the left. Once the battle began, it became clear that the untrained North Carolina regiment was outmatched and they quickly fled from battle. Alone the right flank and the 2nd Maryland regiment was forced to retreat and give up any potential land that they might have gained. Overall the British forces lost 68 men, while the Americans suffered a loss of 900 men killed and 1,000 captured.

=== Battle of Guilford Court House ===
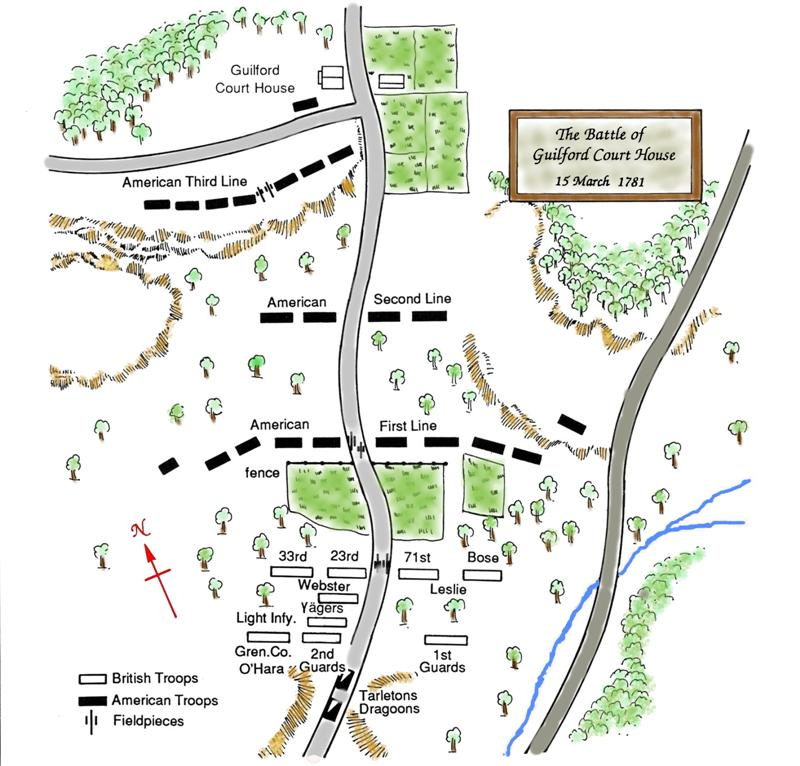
Battle of Guilford Court House

Fought on 15 March 1781 in Greensboro, North Carolina, by Lieutenant General Charles, Lord Cornwallis commanding the British army and Major General Nathanael Greene commanding the American army, the battle ended in a costly British victory in which roughly 100 British soldiers lost their lives, and 413 wounded compared to the 70 and 185 who lost their lives and were wounded respectively.

The original British objective was to attack Greene's encampment as to prevent reinforcements, which would inevitably lead to, a loss of British control in the region. However, when the British arrived at the Court house, where the Americans were stationed, Greene had already prepared three defense lines in which the 2nd Maryland Regiment was stationed in the third line, furthest from the initial British Attack. The British ultimately managed to break thorough the lines, and forced an American retreat, but while the battle only lasted ninety minutes, the British lost over a quarter of their men.

== Legacy ==
The members of the 6th Maryland Regiment and Cecil County Militia are living history re-enactors whom seek to portray accurately, military and early American life.

An online source has been created documenting the casualties of the 6th Regiment during the war. https://web.archive.org/web/20161017165105/http://6thmarylandinfantry.org/familystories/6thMdCasualties.html
