= Philippe Hubert Preudhomme de Borre =

Continental Army officer

Philippe Hubert Chevalier Preudhomme de Borre
- Born: 17 September 1717; Liège, Prince-Bishopric of Liège
- Died: 30 May 1789 (aged 71) Brussels
- Allegiance: (Kingdom of France) France; United States
- Branch: Cavalry, artillery
- Service years: (Kingdom of France) 1740–1776 (United States) 1776–1777 (Kingdom of France) 1779–1780?
- Rank: (United States) Brigadier General, 1776 (Kingdom of France) Brigadier General, 1780
- Conflicts: War of the Austrian Succession; American Revolutionary War
- Awards: Order of Saint Louis 1757

Philippe Hubert, Chevalier de Preudhomme de Borre (17 September 1717 in Liège – 30 May 1789 in Brussels) joined the French Army in 1740 and served in the War of the Austrian Succession. During the American Revolutionary War he traveled to America where he was presented as a military expert. Promoted to general officer, his career as a Continental Army officer was brief and undistinguished. He resigned under a cloud and returned to France in 1779. His career ended in obscurity.

De Borre began his military career in the French royal army as a volunteer. He served as a cavalry officer in several campaigns during the War of the Austrian Succession. In 1745 he was seriously wounded. In 1757 he raised a unit from his home town of Liège in what is now Belgium but evidently saw no action in the Seven Years' War. When he arrived in America in 1776, the Second Continental Congress commissioned him a brigadier general. George Washington assigned de Borre to command the 2nd Maryland Brigade in John Sullivan's division. He led his troops at Staten Island and Brandywine. At the latter battle he proved incapable of handling his troops in action. Threatened with a court martial, he resigned and left America in 1779. He was promoted to brigadier general in the French army in 1780 but he was no longer physically capable of active service.

== Early career ==
De Borre was born on 17 September 1717 at Liège. On 1 May 1740 he joined the Regiment of Champagne as a volunteer. He was commissioned as a sous lieutenant on 26 July 1741 and a lieutenant on 20 April 1742. He became a captain in the Duc de Bretagne Dragoon Regiment on 6 August 1744. After having fought in Bavaria, Bohemia, and Flanders, de Borre was badly wounded during the passage of the Rhine River in 1745. He suffered four sword strokes to his head and one to his wrist. The latter injury crippled one of his hands for life.

While a lieutenant colonel in 1757, de Borre raised a unit from the Prince-Bishopric of Liège, the Liègeois d'Orion Regiment. Though the bishopric was not part of France the Prince-Bishop had an agreement with the King of France provide a regiment for the royal army. On 20 June 1757 King Louis XV made him a Chevalier of the Order of Saint Louis. There is no record of him being in action during the Seven Years' War which was then raging. When his regiment was reorganized on 1 January 1762, he was sent to garrison Metz. Until 1767 his task was to prevent desertion in the area of Liège. On 14 December 1776, then a temporary artillery brigadier general, he set out with Philippe Charles Tronson de Coudray and a large group of French officers who were given the government's blessing to assist the American Revolution. However, the French vessel Amphitrite turned back. De Borre and a fellow officer Thomas-Antoine de Mauduit du Plessis set sail from Saint-Nazaire in the Mercure on 5 February 1777. The ship also carried a secret cargo of gunpowder, small arms, and material for uniforms, all bound for the American army.

== American Revolutionary War ==
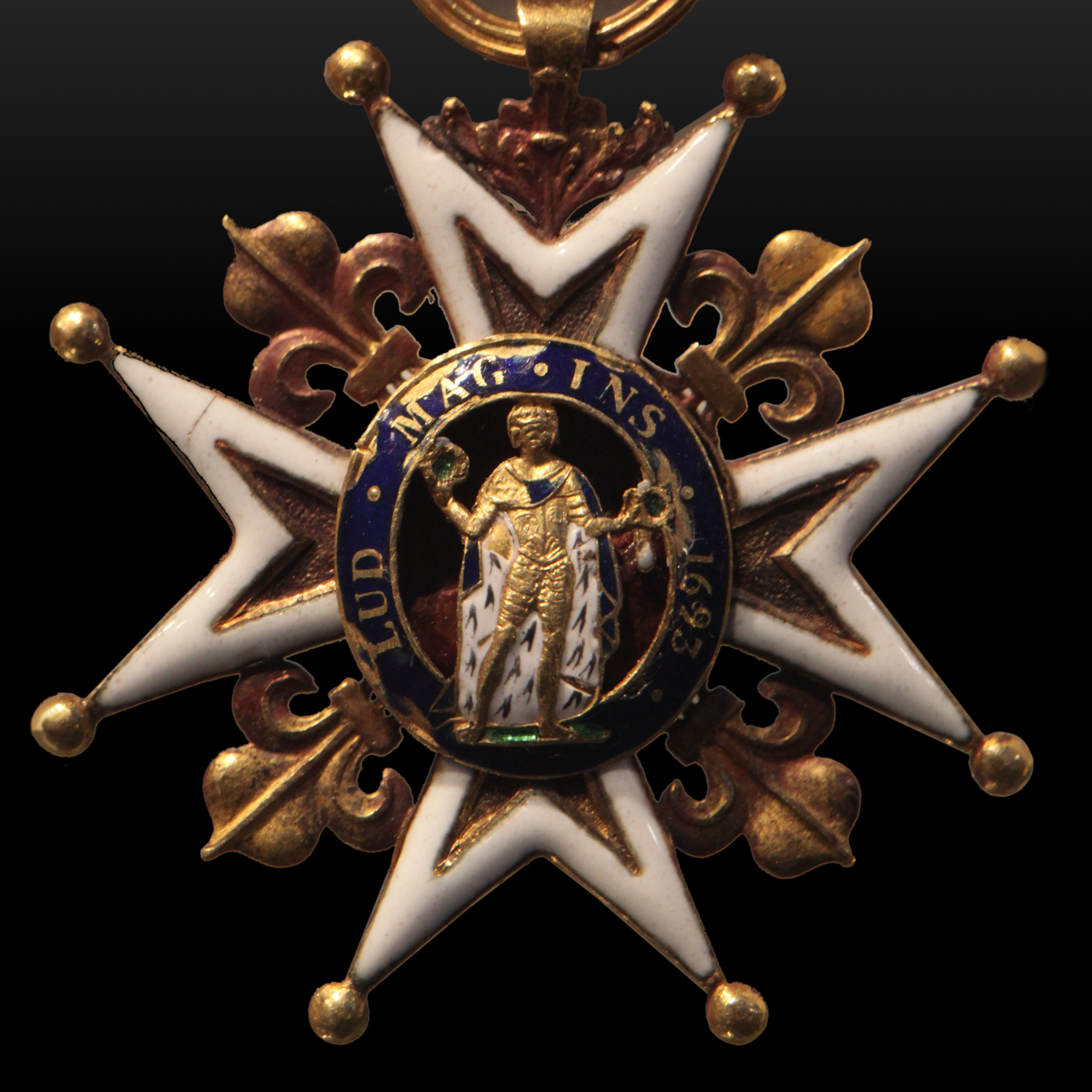
De Borre won the Order of Saint Louis in 1757.

De Borre disembarked from the Mercure at Portsmouth, New Hampshire on 17 March 1777. He made his way to Morristown, New Jersey where on 17 May George Washington presented him with a brigadier general's commission back-dated to 1 December 1776. That week, Washington was in the process of forming the main army into ten permanent brigades. There were four from Virginia, three from Pennsylvania, two from Maryland, and one from New Jersey. William Smallwood was appointed to lead the 1st Maryland Brigade while de Borre was given command of the 2nd Maryland Brigade. At the same time, a Frenchman of Irish heritage, Thomas Conway received command of another brigade. De Borre's brigade consisted of the 2nd Canadian Regiment, and the 2nd, 4th, and 6th Maryland Regiments.

In May 1777, de Coudray and his entourage of 18 officers and 10 sergeants reached America. At this time Americans were becoming aware of the problem of accepting foreign adventurers into their ranks. Some foreign officers proved valuable to the American cause, while others were not useful. For example, Matthias Alexis Roche de Fermoy and Frederick William, Baron de Woedtke proved to be failures as combat generals. Because de Coudray had been promised the rank of major general, Henry Knox, Nathanael Greene, and John Sullivan vowed to resign if the Frenchman was promoted over their heads. Anxious not to offend France, Congress invented the title Inspector General of Ordnance and Military Manufactories for de Coudray but made sure that he had no authority over the combat generals. The freshly-minted Inspector General promptly began quarreling with other French officers such as the capable engineer Louis Lebègue Duportail and involved himself in intrigues. One Frenchman noted that de Coudray's arrogance offended the Congress and damaged relations between the American colonies and France. De Coudray even managed to anger Gilbert Motier, marquis de La Fayette. Finally, on 16 September 1777 de Coudray stupidly rode his horse onto a Schuylkill River ferryboat and the skittish animal leaped overboard, drowning its rider.

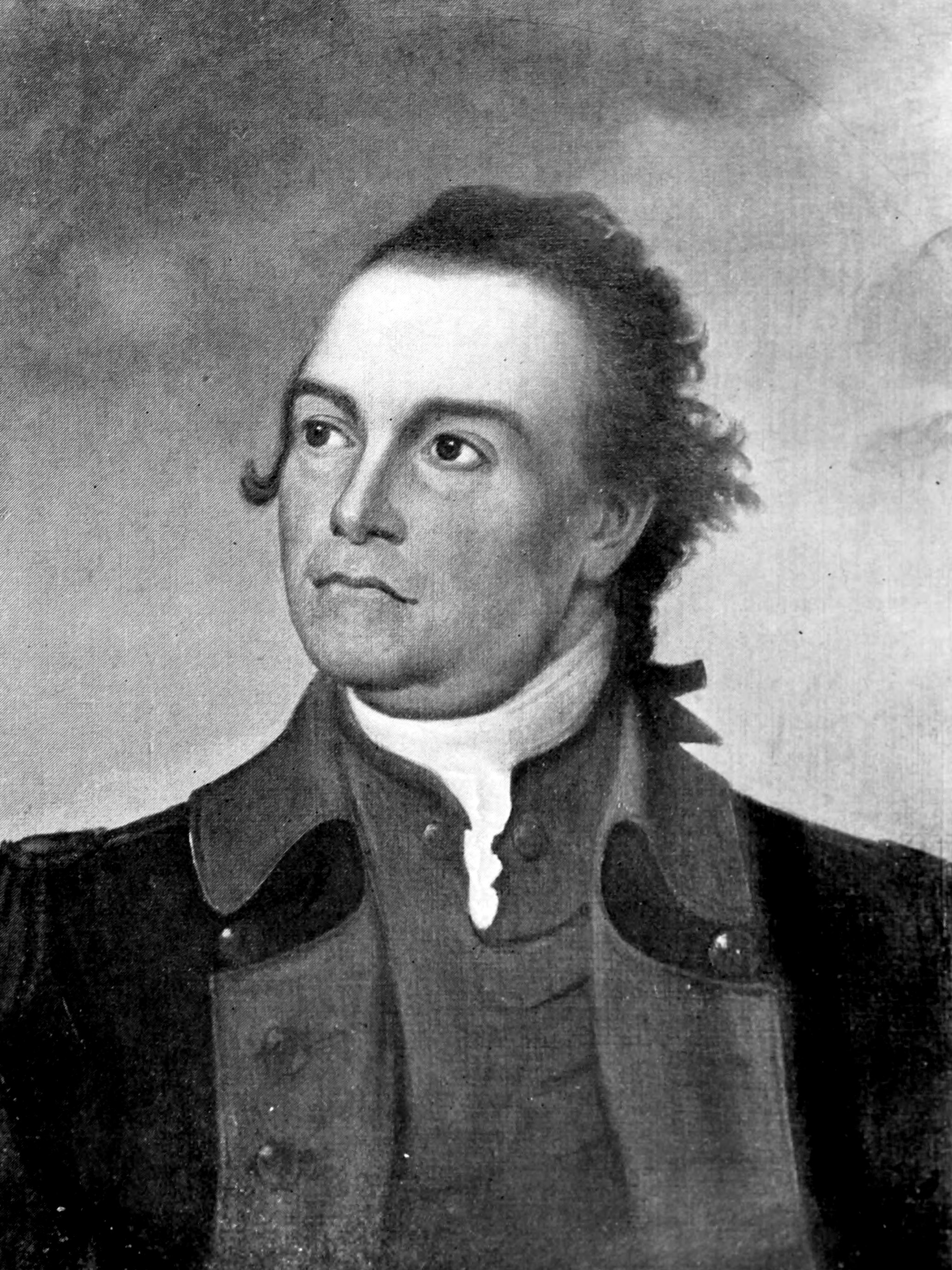
Americans such as John Sullivan resented foreigners being promoted over them.

On 22 August, Sullivan mounted an unsuccessful raid on British positions near New York City in the Battle of Staten Island. The Americans captured most of one loyalist battalion but admitted losing 20 wounded and 150 prisoners. The British claimed to have captured 260 Americans while the New Jersey loyalists lost about 140 captured. Meanwhile, the 2nd Canadian and the 2nd Maryland Regiments apparently suffered the heaviest losses on the American side. One of Sullivan's officers subsequently preferred charges against him for botching the operation. Sullivan asked de Borre, whose brigade had participated, to keep quiet until his court martial could take place. Ultimately, Sullivan was exonerated.

On 11 September, the British-Hessian army of Sir William Howe squared off against Washington's 12,000 continentals and 3,000 militiamen at the Battle of Brandywine. The American left flank at Pyle's Ford was held by John Armstrong Sr. and 2,000 Pennsylvania militia. Nathanael Greene's division of 2,500 men in two Virginia brigades and Francis Nash's 1,500-strong North Carolina brigade held the left center. Anthony Wayne's 2,000 troops in two Pennsylvania brigades defended Chadds Ford in the center. In reserve were 2,500 troops in the divisions of Adam Stephen and William Alexander, Lord Stirling. Stephen led two Virginia brigades while Stirling had a New Jersey and a Pennsylvania brigade. While the rest of the army waited on the east bank of Brandywine Creek, William Maxwell's 1,000 light infantry and some militia fought a delaying action on the west bank. See the Brandywine order of battle for details of both armies.

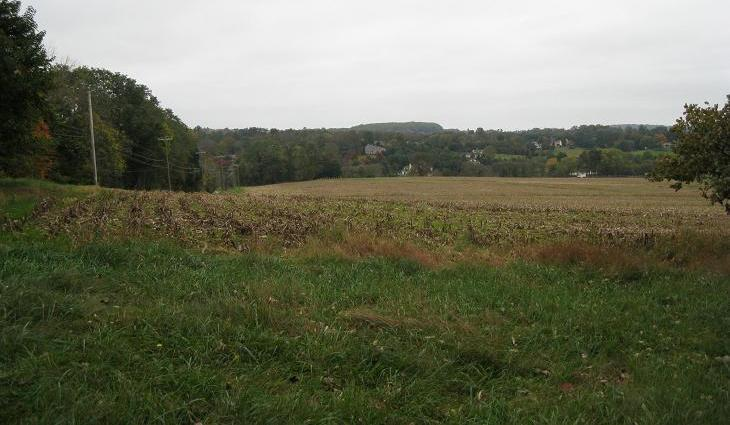
This view from the British position on Osborne's Hill looks southeast. From (photo) left to right, the American divisions of Stephen, Stirling, and Sullivan opposed Howe's troops.

Sullivan's division held the right flank with the two Maryland brigades. He deployed 1,100 troops and two artillery pieces from both de Borre's and Smallwood's brigades at Brinton's Ford. The 250-man Delaware Regiment from the 1st Brigade was detached to hold Jones's Ford, the next crossing place to the north. Moses Hazen's 400-strong 2nd Canadian Regiment defended Wister's and Buffington's Fords, which were even more distant. American reconnaissance that day was woefully deficient. Howe divided his 18,000 British and Hessian troops into two wings. He sent the right wing under Wilhelm von Knyphausen to advance directly on Chadds Ford. Meanwhile, the more powerful left wing under Howe and Lord Charles Cornwallis marched north. About noon, Howe's wing crossed the Brandywine at undefended Jefferis's Ford, which was north of Buffington's. Howe's column veered to the southeast past Strode's Mill toward Osborne's Hill where the footsore troops were permitted to rest. At this location they were finally spotted by American cavalrymen and Theodorick Bland quickly notified both Washington and Sullivan of the danger.

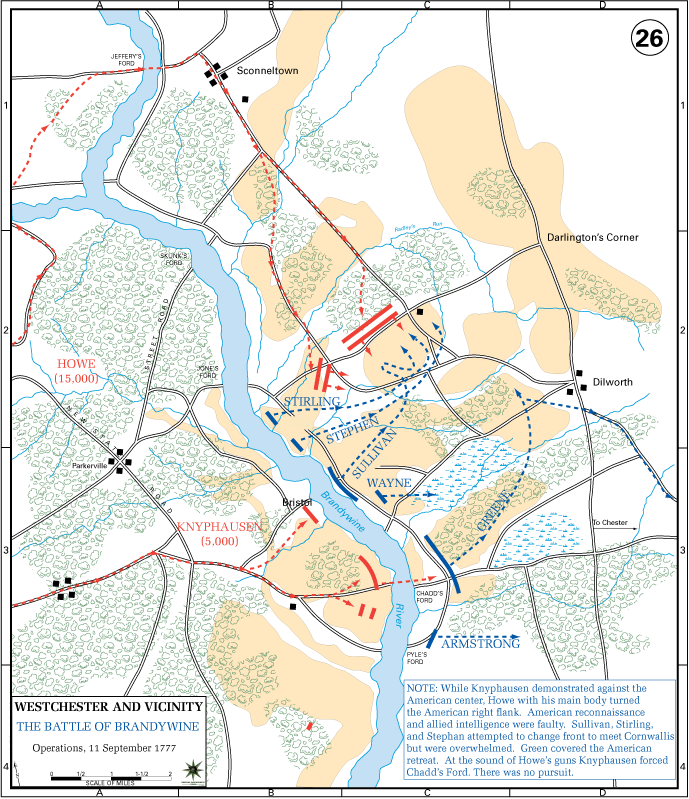
Battle of Brandywine map shows Stirling and Stephen deployed on Sullivan's right when in fact they started in reserve near Chadds Ford. The map shows their final positions correctly. Birmingham Quaker Meetinghouse is the single black square near the map center.

Washington immediately instructed Stirling and Stephen to march north toward Birmingham Meeting House, a place of Quaker worship. These two divisions had time to deploy on a ridge to the southeast of Birmingham. At 2:30 PM Sullivan received orders to rendezvous with the other two divisions and take command of the right wing. Not only did he need to navigate through difficult terrain, but he had to link up with the Delaware Regiment and Hazen's men. During the maneuver, de Borre asked Sullivan if Hazen's regiment could rejoin his brigade, but the request was denied. De Borre was miffed because this left his brigade with only 350 men.

After Sullivan got his men onto a hill 400 yards (366 m) west of Birmingham he realized that his division was separated from and several hundred yards in front of the other two divisions. Sullivan rode over to confer with Stirling and Stephen. Because Smallwood was on detached duty with the Maryland militia, de Borre was left in charge of the two Maryland brigades. The Frenchman, whose command of English was rudimentary, was not popular with the officers or the rank and file. Sullivan issued orders for the Maryland division to move to the right in order to come in line with the other two divisions. To make room, Stephen and Stirling also had to shift rightward.

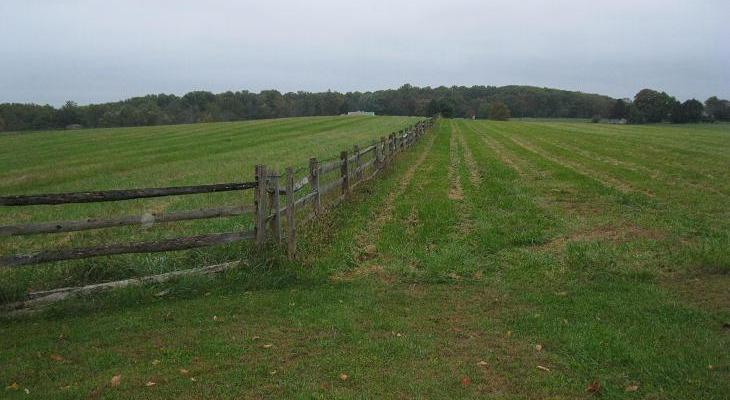
The view is southwest from Wylie and Birmingham Roads. De Borre performed his strange maneuver in the area beyond the tree line. The British attack went from right to left.

Stephen and Stirling moved their divisions without incident, even though their troops were coming under fire from the enemy's light troops. De Borre somehow mismanaged the shift of Sullivan's division. Instead of simply moving to the right, the Frenchman ordered the division to file off to the left and circle back to the northeast. At the end of the bizarre maneuver, the 1st Brigade was in almost the same position it started. Instead of being alongside the 1st Brigade, the 2nd Brigade was behind it. At this moment, the crack Brigade of Guards supported by two 12-pound cannons attacked. When the sound of gunfire erupted, the confused soldiers of the 2nd Brigade volleyed into the backs of the 1st Brigade. The 1st Maryland Regiment put up some resistance, suffering 26 casualties, but the entire division soon crumbled. The soldiers headed to the rear pursued by the British Guards. De Borre later stated to Samuel Smith of the 4th Maryland that a wound on his cheek was caused by the English firing fish hooks. Smith suspected that de Borre misrepresented his injury and that it was caused by riding through some briars. Since it led the column of march, Hazen's regiment apparently did not take part in de Borre's maneuver and instead joined Stirling's left flank.

Under the direction of Sullivan, the divisions of Stirling and Stephen resisted the British attack stoutly for an hour. Stirling's command was forced to retreat first, though Conway acquitted himself well. Finally, Stephen's division was overwhelmed and compelled to withdraw. Washington averted a disaster when he brought up George Weedon's brigade of Greene's division at 6:00 PM to slow the British pursuit.

De Borre reported to Congress that his division ran away without having suffered any casualties. He urged Washington to pull the entire army back into Philadelphia and call up 50,000 militia to annoy the British, but this suggestion was ignored. Charged with mismanagement and told that a court of inquiry would be convened, de Borre sent in his resignation on 14 September and Congress accepted it. The next day he explained that he had resigned because he led "nothing but bad troops" and he refused to be dishonored. Historian Mark M. Boatner III remarked that the war record of the 2nd Maryland Brigade showed that it was made up of excellent regiments. Sullivan, who was often at the center of controversy, was also blamed for the defeat. A story arose at the time that he insisted on his division being assigned to hold the post of honor on the right flank, but historian Thomas J. McGuire disproved this myth. Congress demanded that Sullivan be recalled, but Washington declined to remove him because it would have left the Maryland division leaderless.

== Later career ==
Leaving Charleston, South Carolina on 20 January 1779, de Borre took dispatches to Charles Hector, comte d'Estaing whose French fleet was then at Cap-François in Haiti. From there, he had an eventful voyage home to France on the frigate Andromaque (40). En route, the warship sank the British privateer Tartar on 15 May and arrived at Brest, France on 5 July. He was promoted to brigadier general in the French royal army as of 1 March 1780, but a little over one month later the retirement process was begun due to his physical disability. He died in Brussels, in his house on the "Cantersteen" on 30 May 1789, with funeral at the Collegiale des Ss Michel et Gudule on 1 June. His unpublished manuscript, Journal des campagnes de 1777 et 1778 au service des colonies unies de l'Amérique, is in the French Archives historiques de la Guerre.
