= 3rd Maryland Regiment =

- Regimental flag
- Active: 27 March 1776–1783
- Country: United States
- Allegiance: (United States) Continental Congress
- Type: Infantry
- Size: 728 soldiers (1776); 611 soldiers (1781)
- Part of: Maryland Line
- Engagements: American Revolutionary War: Battle of Brandywine (1777); Battle of Germantown (1777); Battle of Monmouth (1778); Battle of Camden (1780); Battle of Cowpens (1781); Battle of Yorktown (1781)

Commanders
- Notable commanders: Colonel Mordecai Gist, Lieutenant-Colonel Nathaniel Ramsey

The 3rd Maryland Regiment was an infantry regiment of the Continental Army during the American Revolutionary War. It served from 1776 to 1783, mostly in the Middle Atlantic Region of the conflict.

== Background ==
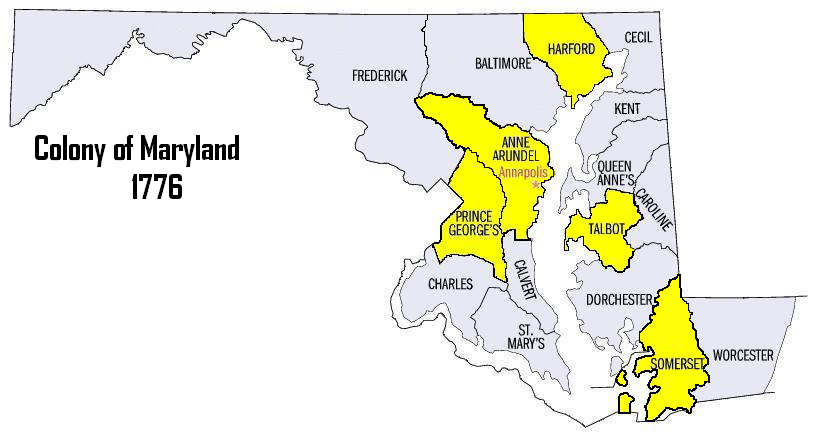
Recruitment Areas

The 3rd Maryland Regiment was organized on 27 March 1776 of eight companies from Anne Arundel, Prince George's, Talbot, Harford and Somerset counties of the colony of Maryland.

The regiment was authorized on 16 September 1776 for service with the Continental Army and was assigned on 27 December 1776 to the main element.

== 1st Maryland Brigade ==
On 22 May 1777 it was assigned to the 1st Maryland Brigade. The regiment was re-organized to nine companies on 12 May 1779. On 5 April 1780 the 1st Maryland Brigade was reassigned to the Southern Department. The regiment was relieved from the 1st Maryland Brigade on 1 January 1781. It was assigned to Gist's Brigade on 24 September 1781 in the main Continental Army. Three days later (27 September 1781) Gist's Brigade was reassigned to the Southern Department. On 4 January 1782 the regiment was reassigned from Gist's Brigade to the Maryland Brigade in the Southern Department. The regiment would see action during the Battle of Brandywine, Battle of Germantown, Battle of Monmouth, Battle of Camden, Battle of Guilford Court House, Battle of Eutaw Springs and the Battle of Yorktown. The regiment disbanded on 1 January 1783 at Charleston, South Carolina.

== Under Gist's command ==
Gist became colonel in command of the 3rd Maryland on 10 December 1776. On 22 May 1777, George Washington assigned the regiment to the 1st Maryland Brigade together with the 1st Delaware Regiment, and the 1st, 5th, 7th Maryland Regiments. During the Battle of Brandywine on 11 September 1777, both the popular brigade commander William Smallwood and Gist were on detached duty recruiting the Maryland militia. This left the disliked Frenchman Philippe Hubert Preudhomme de Borre as the senior brigadier. The regiment was in John Sullivan's division on the right flank, guarding Brinton's Ford while other elements of the division guarded three upstream fords. Finding that the greater part of Sir William Howe's army had marched into the right rear of his division, Sullivan had to march cross country in an attempt to block the move. Finding his division in an awkward position, Sullivan rode off to confer with Adam Stephen and Lord Stirling and ordered De Borre to shift the division to the right. The inept Frenchman botched the evolution, throwing the troops into disorder just as they came under attack by the Brigade of Guards. According to John Hoskins Stone, commander of the 1st Maryland, only his regiment and the 3rd put up a creditable fight. As they tried to resist the oncoming British, the confused 2nd Brigade mistakenly fired a volley into the two regiments from behind. The badly mishandled Marylanders then fled.

Gist commanded the 3rd Maryland at the Battle of Germantown. He led the 3rd Maryland until 9 January 1779 when he was promoted brigadier general in command of the 2nd Maryland Brigade.

== Battle of Monmouth ==
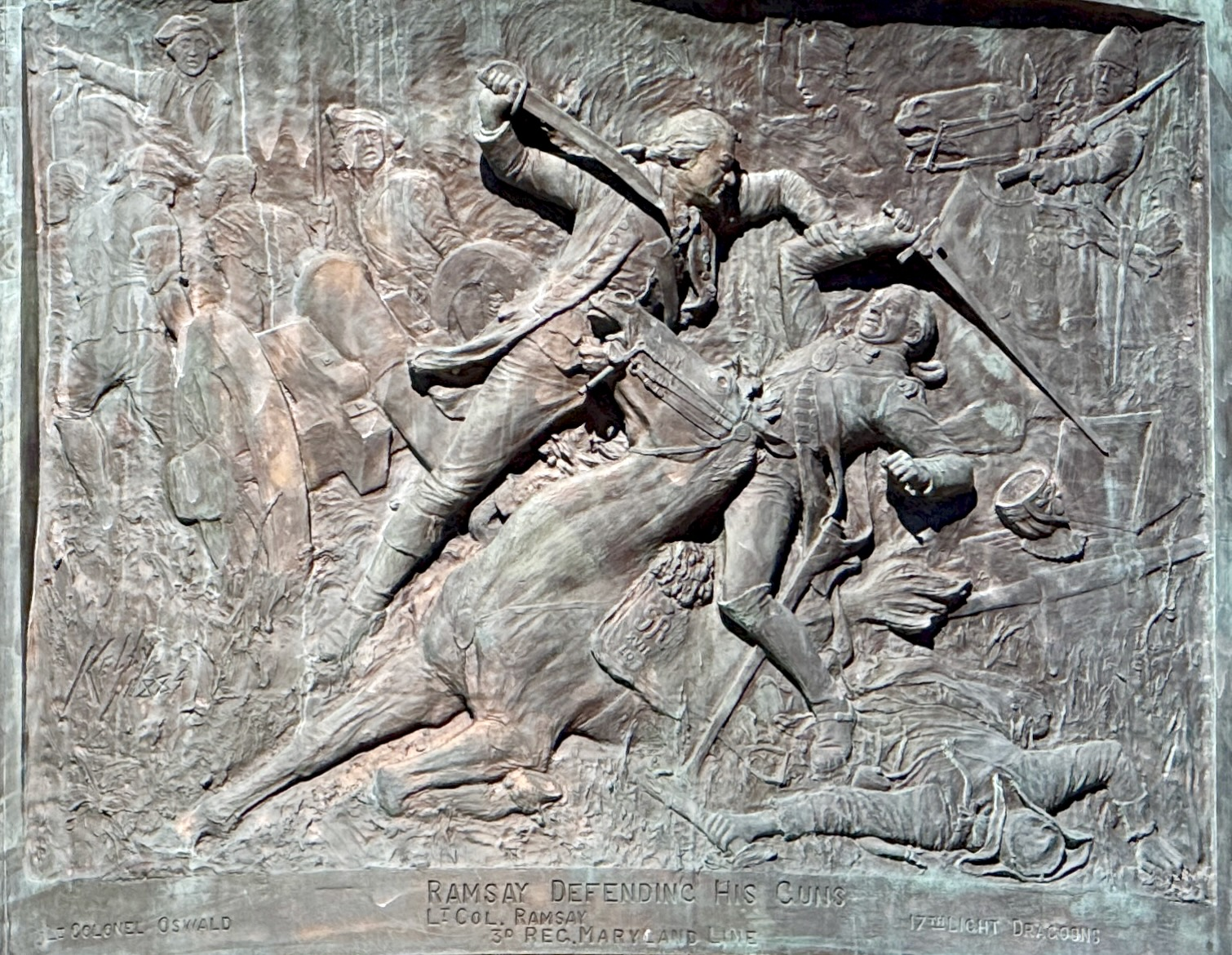
Ramsay Defending His Guns bas-relief on the Monmouth Battle Monument

At Monmouth, the regiment was commanded by Colonel Mordecai Gist while its second-in-command was Lieutenant Colonel Nathaniel Ramsey. Ramsey was detached to Colonel James Wesson's detachment under Brigadier General Anthony Wayne. Early in the battle, Wesson was wounded and Ramsey assumed command of his detachment. (Note: Presumably, part of the regiment was detached with Ramsey, but this is not directly stated by the source.) Surprised by a sudden British counterattack, the American advance guard began to retreat.

Washington personally asked Ramsey and Colonel Walter Stewart to hold off the British while he arranged the main line of defense. The two officers agreed and Wayne deployed their soldiers in a nearby wood. As the Brigade of Guards came up to their hidden position, the Americans opened fire into their flank. The Guards charged and cleared the wood after a tough fight in which they lost 40 casualties including Colonel Henry Trelawney wounded. Stewart was shot and carried off. The retreating Americans were set upon in the open by a troop of the 16th Light Dragoons. A dragoon rode up to the unhorsed Ramsey and fired at him with his pistol. The weapon misfired and Ramsey attacked the trooper with his sword, dragged him from his horse, and tried to ride away.

Surrounded by dragoons, Ramsey was badly wounded and left for dead. Later, the British picked him up as a prisoner. Impressed by his bravery, the British commander Sir Henry Clinton paroled Ramsey the next day. Ramsey was not exchanged until December 1780.
