= Battle of Hobkirk's Hill =

1781 battle of the American Revolutionary War

- Part of the American Revolutionary War
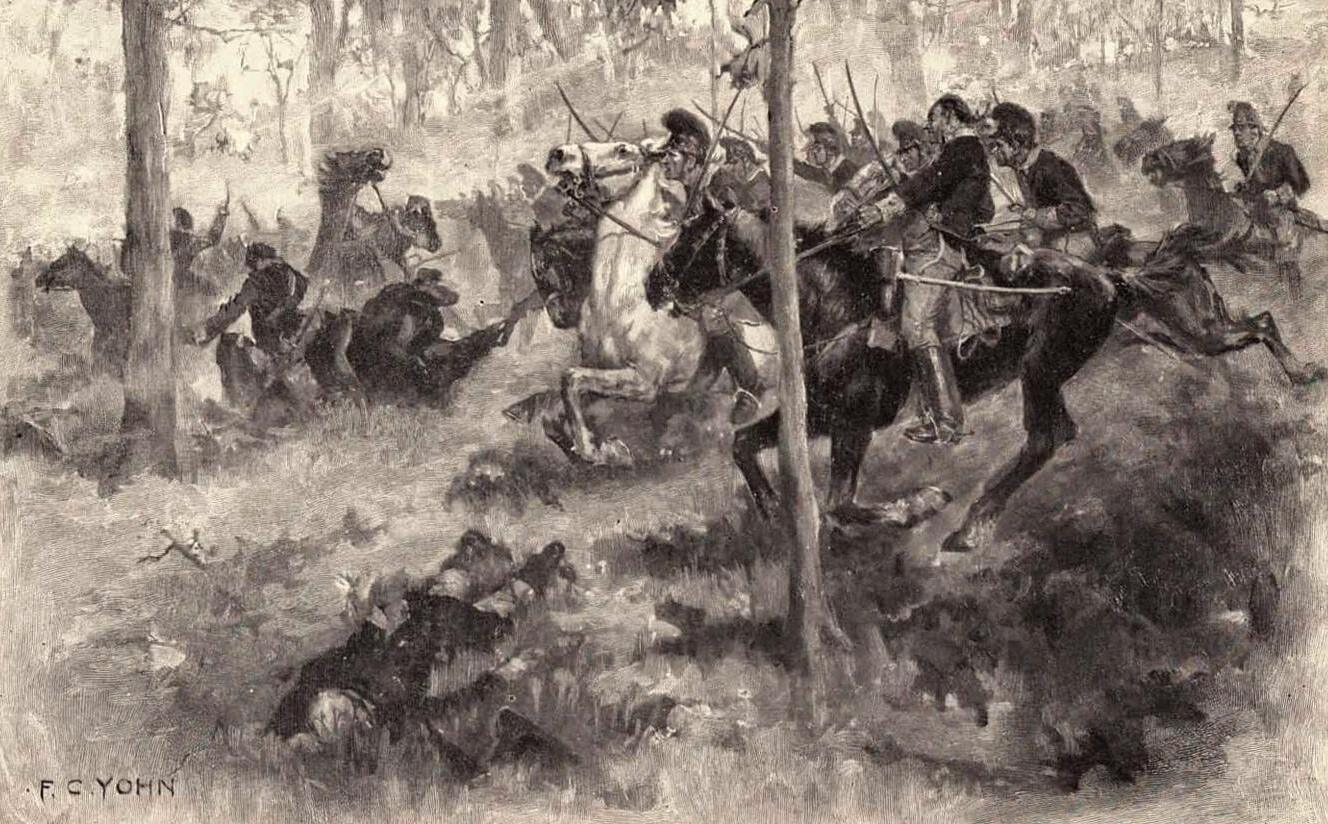
- 1898 illustration of the battle by Frederick Coffay Yohn
Date	April 25, 1781
Location	Camden, South Carolina 34°16′28″N 80°36′26″W
Result	British victory

Belligerents
Great Britain	United States

Commanders and leaders
Lord Rawdon	Nathanael Greene

Strength
900 regulars and militia	1,550 regulars and militia

Casualties and losses
39 killed 210 wounded 12 missing	19 killed 113 wounded 89 captured 50 missing

The Battle of Hobkirk's Hill (also known to as the Second Battle of Camden) was fought on April 25, 1781, near Camden, South Carolina, as part of the Southern theater of the American Revolutionary War. 1,550 American regulars and militia under Major General Nathanael Greene occupying Hobkirk's Hill, north of Camden, were attacked by a British force of 900 regulars and militia under Lieutenant-colonel Lord Rawdon. After a fierce clash, Greene retreated, leaving Rawdon's force in possession of the hill.

Despite his victory, Rawdon soon fell back to Camden and two weeks later found it necessary to abandon Camden and withdraw toward Charleston, South Carolina. The battle was one of four engagements in which Greene was defeated. The battlefield marker is located at Broad Street and Greene Street two miles north of the center of modern Camden.

== Background ==
Following its victory at the Battle of Guilford Court House, Lieutenant-general Lord Cornwallis's force was spent and in great need of supply. Cornwallis therefore moved his army towards Wilmington, North Carolina where he had previously ordered supplies to be sent. Major General Nathanael Greene pursued the British force for a short time before deciding to take his forces into South Carolina. Greene hoped that by threatening the British garrisons in the state he could force Cornwallis to pursue him and then engage the British on ground favorable to his army. When informed of this strategy, Henry Lee III replied on April 2:

I am decidedly of opinion with you that nothing is left for you but to imitate the example of Scipio Africanus.

Scipio Africanus had defeated Carthaginian forces in Spain 'in detail,' a tactic where a larger force attacks and defeats smaller enemy units one at a time, rather than engaging the entire enemy force at once. This strategy allows for the systematic destruction of the enemy while minimizing risks to the attacking force.

When Cornwallis did not pursue the Continental Army, Greene chose to reduce the British garrisons scattered throughout South Carolina in order to force the British back into Charleston. To this end, Greene started his army of 1,450 men, made up of four Continental regiments, Lee's Legion, Washington's Cavalry and Campbell's Riflemen, as rapidly and secretly as possible towards Camden, which was at the center of the British line of posts in South Carolina. At the same time he hoped to secure the cooperation of the various partisan bands in South Carolina. The movement was part of an intricate campaign organised by Greene involving Continental and militia troops all across the state. To that end, he sent Lee and his men to assist General Francis Marion, whose small band of militia was being pursued by 400 British troops under John Watson, in the hopes of preventing Watson and his men from reaching Camden before the battle. To that end he was successful, as the combined forces of Lee and Marion forced Watson to make a lengthy detour before eventually rejoining the British forces at Camden after the battle.

The Camden garrison under Lieutenant-colonel Lord Francis Rawdon included the 63rd Regiment of Foot, Volunteers of Ireland, King's American Regiment, New York Volunteers, South Carolina Royalists and a small detachment of cavalry.

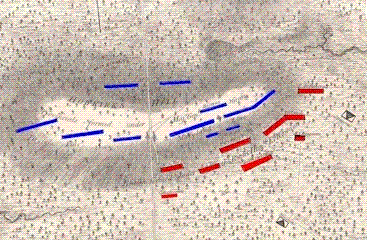
Disposition of force at the start of conflict

The town of Camden was situated on a gentle elevation. To the south and southwest lay the Wateree River and to the east was Pinetree creek. A ring of redoubts, constructed by the British during their year-long occupation of the town, stretched from the Wateree to the Pinetree and covered the northern approaches. Upon arrival on April 20, 1781 at Camden, it was apparent that the Continentals had lost the element of surprise as Rawdon's forces were prepared on all fronts. Being unable to storm the town or surround the entire circle of fortifications, Greene chose to encamp his army about a mile and a half away on a small elevation called Hobkirk's Hill, blocking Great Waxhaw Road. As he did not have enough men to besiege Camden, Greene, hoping to draw Rawdon into an attack on the position, organized the camp so that battle positions could be taken quickly in the event of an alarm.

The following evening, Greene's intelligence indicated that a force of some four hundred British soldiers was marching to Camden to join Rawdon's garrison. Greene detached some of the South Carolina militia under Colonel Carrington to the east with some of his artillery to cover the road from Charleston. Finding the terrain too marshy for the artillery, Carrington removed the cannon to a position of safety and awaited further orders. On April 24, having received updated information that the additional forces were not on their way to join the Camden garrison, Greene ordered Carrington back to Hobkirk's Hill.

Early the next morning a Continental deserter, sometimes identified as a drummer, made his way into Camden. He was brought before Rawdon and informed the British commander of the Continental Army's dispositions and that they had no artillery. Fearing that Generals Marion and Lee were on their way to join Greene and believing the Continental artillery was many miles away, Rawdon decided it was a judicious time to attack.

== Order of Battle ==
The order of battle of forces during the battle was:

=== Continentals ===
- Commanding Officer, Major General Nathanael Greene
- 1 Company from the Delaware Regiment
- 3 6-pounder cannons, 1 coy commanded by Colonel Charles Harrison
- 3 Companies from the North Carolina Militia by Colonel Thomas Wooten
- Virginia Cavalry, commanded by Lieutenant Colonel William Washington
  - White's Cavalry Regiment
  - Washington's Cavalry Regiment
- Maryland Brigade, commanded by Colonel Otho Holland Williams
  - 1st Maryland Regiment
  - 2nd Maryland Regiment
- Virginia Brigade, commanded by Brigadier General Isaac Huger (these regiments were recently reorganized from the three Virginia battalions that had fought at Guilford Courthouse)
  - 1st Virginia Regiment - Lieutenant Colonel Richard Campbell
  - 2nd Virginia Regiment - Lieutenant Colonel Samuel Hawes
  - Light Infantry Company - Captain Simon Morgan

=== British ===
- Commanding Officer, Lieutenant-colonel Lord Rawdon
- 1 Troop of the New York Dragoons (Provincial)
- 63rd Regiment of Foot
- Volunteers of Ireland
- King's American Regiment
- New York Volunteers
- South Carolina Provincial Regiment
- 2 6-pounder guns, 1 coy of 40-50 men from Royal Artillery

== Battle ==
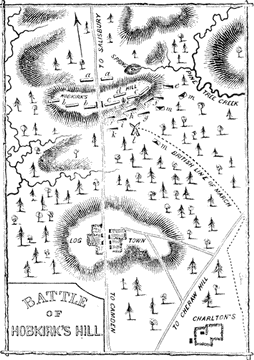
Battle of Hobkirk's Hill

On the morning of April 25, 1781, Rawdon was still under the impression that the Continental army was without its artillery. At approximately 9:00 am he left the security of the Camden fortifications with 900 troops. Unknown to Rawdon, Carrington had returned to Hobkirk's Hill that morning, together with the artillery and provisions, which were distributed to the Continental troops. At around 11 am, while many of the Continentals were occupied with cooking and washing clothes, their advanced pickets detected the British forces which had gained the American left by a long march skirting a swamp next to the ridge occupied by the Continental Army.

The advanced pickets, under Captain Robert Kirkwood, were able to delay the British advance giving Greene time to give orders and line his forces up for battle. He placed the Virginia Regiment under Lieutenant Colonel Campbell on the extreme right with another Virginia Regiment under Lieutenant Colonel Samuel Hawes to their left. On the extreme left, Greene placed the 5th Maryland Regiment under Lieutenant Colonel Benjamin Ford, with the 1st Maryland Regiment commanded by John Gunby to their right. The artillery was placed in the center with North Carolina militia in the rear. The three 6-pound cannons and 40 Virginia gunners were directed by Colonel Charles Harrison.

Having extricated his forces from the woods and forced back the pickets, Rawdon arranged his forces and slowly advanced up the ridge towards the waiting Continentals. Greene, perceiving the British forces were presenting a narrow front, ordered an attack. He instructed Campbell on the right to wheel his men to the left and engage the British on their flank with Ford to take his men and make a similar movement on the left. Greene ordered the two remaining regiments in the center to advance with bayonets and confront the enemy head on, while Washington was to take his cavalry around the British left flank and attack the enemy in the rear. The forceful movement of the Americans and the unexpected contribution of their artillery to the exchange inflicted heavy casualties on the British, but their line held.

During the advance of the 1st Maryland on the British left, Captain William Beatty Jr., who was in command to the right of the 1st Maryland regiment, was killed causing his company to stop their advance. Gunby ordered his men to stop their advance and fall back with the intention of reforming their line. At this time, Benjamin Ford of the 5th Maryland was mortally wounded, which threw his troops into disorder. When the Continental flank began to fall apart, Lord Rawdon and the Volunteers of Ireland (Rawdon's Personal Regiment) charged. The Maryland troops rallied briefly to fire a few rounds and then fled. Lord Rawdon, although outnumbered nearly two to one, and without artillery, took the field.

== Casualties ==
The British casualties were 39 killed, 210 wounded and 12 missing. The American casualties may be ascertained from two documents written by Colonel Otho Holland Williams, General Greene's deputy adjutant-general. The first of these, a 'List of the officers killed, wounded, and taken prisoners, in the action before Camden, the 25th of April, 1781', details 1 officer and 18 enlisted men killed, 5 officers and 108 enlisted men wounded, 2 officers captured (one of them wounded) and 136 enlisted men missing. Williams wrote, "The greatest part of those who are missing had not well understood the order to rally at Saunder's creek; some were killed; 47 of them were wounded, and are in the enemy's hospital; we have tidings of about one third of the remaining number, and hope they will be able to join us". The second of these documents is a letter from Williams to his brother, dated April 27, in which he wrote, "Capt I. Smith of the Third, and Capt Lunt [Lieut] Bruff are both prisoners, last wounded. Lieut Trueman is a prisoner, and it is said thirty-nine privates of our army are taken, besides a number wounded, the whole amounting to about fifty" This would indicate that 2 officers and 39 enlisted men were taken prisoner apart from the 1 officer and 47 enlisted men who were wounded and captured. The total American loss at Hobkirk's Hill would therefore appear to be 19 killed; 113 wounded; 48 wounded prisoners; 41 unwounded prisoners and 50 missing unaccounted for; some of whom were killed.

== Aftermath ==
Washington and his cavalry never made it to the action. Their circuit to reach the British rear took them to Rawdon's hospital and commissary area, where they took 200 prisoners. Thus laden, they were too late to assist in the battle, and joined Greene's army on its retreat from the battlefield. Washington did, however, return in time to save the three cannons from capture. The guns were dragged from the field by 45 Maryland infantrymen. This company repelled a number of charges by loyalist horsemen under John Coffin but they suffered serious losses in the process.

The American retreat did not last long. Rawdon withdrew most of his forces to Camden, leaving only a company of dragoons at the battlefield. That afternoon, Greene sent Washington and Kirkwood back to Hobkirk's Hill, where they ambushed and drove the dragoons away; Greene turned the army around and reoccupied the site. Colonel Gunby was castigated by Greene for his actions that caused the line to break. A court martial that was immediately convened found that his "spirit and activity were unexceptionable" but that his order to fall back was "in all probability the only cause why we did not obtain a complete victory", without mentioning the failures of Washington and his cavalry's late arrival.

Rawdon returned to Camden, where Watson's men joined him on May 7. However, the ongoing presence of Greene on one flank and South Carolina militia general Thomas Sumter on another, and the fact that Marion and Lee were wreaking havoc with his supply and communications with Charleston, convinced him that he could no longer hold Camden. On May 9, Rawdon abandoned Camden, retreating to Moncks Corner.

At the time of the battle, future president of the United States, Andrew Jackson was in the Camden District jail, a mile and a half to the south. Although he was in the early stages of smallpox, he saw something of the battle through a knothole.

== Preservation ==
The American Battlefield Trust and its partners have saved more than 22 acres of the battlefield at Hobkirk's Hill as of mid-2023.

== See also ==
- American Revolutionary War § War in the South. Places ' Battle of Hobkirk's Hill ' in overall sequence and strategic context.
