= Thomas Wooten =

American military officer and politician

Col. Thomas Wooten
- Wooten Family Coat of Arms

County Commissioner of Wake County, North Carolina
- In office February 1780 – July 1781

Sheriff of Wake County, North Carolina
- In office December 5, 1777 – December 4, 1780

Member of the North Carolina General Assembly for Wake County
- In office April 1777 – December 1777

Justice of the Peace for Wake County, North Carolina
- In office June 1771 – March 1776

Personal details
- Born: 1725 Halifax, Province of North Carolina, Colonial North America
- Died: 1808 (aged 82–83) Oglethorpe County, Georgia, United States
- Party: Patriot (American Revolution)
- Spouses: Sarah Rabun (1735–1768); Tabitha Bradford (1730–1828)
- Children: 4, including Mary Ann Wooten
- Occupation: Politician; Military Officer; Sheriff

Military service
- Allegiance: United States of America
- Years of service: 1775-1783
- Rank: Lt. Colonel; Colonel
- Commands: Wake County Regiment of the North Carolina Militia (Minutemen)
- Battles/wars: American Revolutionary War; Battle of Moore's Creek Bridge; Battle of Briar Creek; Battle of Stono Ferry; Siege of Charleston; Battle of Camden; Battle of Cowan's Ford; Battle of Guildford Court House; Battle of Hobkirk's Hill; Battle of Eutaw Springs

Colonel Thomas Wooten was an American sheriff, politician, and military officer who served in the American Revolutionary War. In 1771, he was one of the founding politicians for Wake County, North Carolina. He also served as the Sheriff and as County Commissioner for Wake County, North Carolina.

== Early life & family ==
Thomas Wooten was born to Benjamin Wooten and Elizabeth Rousseau in Halifax, North Carolina. His maternal grandfather, Hillaire Rousseau was a Huguenot from Nantes.

== Political career ==
Wooten started his political career when he was present for the creation of Wake County, North Carolina in 1771 and was its first Justice of the Peace. He later went on to serve in other roles such as a Member of the North Carolina General Assembly, Sheriff, and County Commissioner. As comminssioner, he was involved with the overseeing of the collection and management of taxes and provisions to support the local militia. In this role, he collected grain and bacon taxes, including one bushel of corn per person and one-fifth pound of bacon per resident, and was authorized to purchase additional provisions for troops beyond these levies. Payments for these provisions were issued as specie certificates bearing six percent interest, which Wooten signed and distributed with the assistance of his deputy, John Abernathie.

== Military career ==
He served as a Lt. Colonel and later Colonel of the Wake County Regiment, commanding them at several battles during the American Revolutionary War such as the Battle of Moore's Creek Bridge, the Siege of Charleston, the Battle of Camden, and the Battle of Guilford Court House.

== Later life & legacy ==
In 1782, he moved to Oglethorpe County, Georgia where he acquired a large tract of land. He died in 1808, leaving behind 4 children. His great-great granddaughter, Mary Irion married George McElderry, a son of Thomas McElderry.
