= John Gunby =

American planter and soldier (1745–1807)

- Born: March 10, 1745; Somerset County, Maryland, British America
- Died: May 17, 1807 (aged 62); Snow Hill, Maryland, U.S.
- Military career
- Allegiance: United States of America
- Service years: 1775–1783
- Rank: Continental Army: Captain January 14, 1776; Lieutenant Colonel December 10, 1776; Colonel April 17, 1777; Brevet Brigadier General September 30, 1783
- Units: Continental Army: 2ND Independent Maryland Company; 7th Maryland Regiment; 2nd Maryland Regiment; 1st Maryland Regiment
- Commands: Continental Army: 2ND Independent Maryland Company; 7th Maryland Regiment; 2nd Maryland Regiment; 1st Maryland Regiment
- Conflicts: American Revolutionary War; Battle of White Plains; Battle of Trenton; Second Battle of Trenton; Battle of Brandywine; Battle of Cowpens; Battle of Guilford Court House; Battle of Hobkirk's Hill; Battle of Eutaw Springs

John Gunby (March 10, 1745 – May 17, 1807) was an American planter and soldier from Somerset County, Maryland, who is considered by many to be "one of the most gallant officers of the Maryland Line under Gen. Smallwood". He entered service volunteering as a minuteman in 1775 and fought for the American cause until the end earning praise as probably the most brilliant soldier whom Maryland contributed to the War of Independence. Gunby was also the grandfather of Senator Ephraim King Wilson II.

== Early life ==
The Gunby family arrived in Maryland around 1660, coming from Yorkshire, England, and settling in Queen Anne's County. Around 1710, his grandfather moved the family to Somerset County to a farm at Gunby's Creek, an inlet of Pocomoke Bay, near present-day Crisfield where John Gunby was born on March 10, 1745. During his youth, Gunby had many opportunities to deal with persons from different social classes as the Gunby home was considered a rendezvous for the people of the neighboring country and the family exercised substantial influence due to their large land holdings and sea vessels with which they engaged in coastal trade.

In the spring of 1775, at the age of 30, Gunby volunteered as a minuteman, for which his father, a staunch loyalist, warned him that he was running the risk of being hanged as a traitor. John Gunby is said to have replied:

I am determined to join American forces, come what will. We have little fear, for justice will dominate, and the colonies, as victors, will live to adopt a crown of freedom, not one of oppression. Your arguments, your entreaties your commands will avail nothing. For me, I would rather sink into a patriots grave then wear the crown of England.

== Early War ==
When the Revolution began, Gunby joined the American forces and formed an independent military company at his own expense. The equipping and maintaining of this company, which was among the first to be organized, cost Gunby most of his wealth. The company, including officers, numbered a hundred and three men. On January 2, 1776, he was elected captain of the 2nd Independent Maryland Company – Somerset County.

In the early part of the War, Gunby's company spent much of their time patrolling southern Maryland and breaking up Tory camps which were to be found on the lower part of the peninsula as Somerset County was a leading Tory stronghold. On August 16, 1776, the 2nd Independent Maryland Company was ordered north to join General George Washington's army as part of Maryland's quota of troops towards the Continental Army.

Although specific information is lacking, it is known that the 2nd Independent Maryland Company under Gunby's command participated in the following battles/campaigns:

2nd Independent Maryland Company Battles under Command of John Gunby
Battle	Date	Campaign
Battle of White Plains	October 28, 1776	New York and New Jersey campaign
Battle of Trenton	December 26, 1776	New York and New Jersey campaign
Second Battle of Trenton	January 2, 1777	New York and New Jersey campaign
Battle of Brandywine	September 11, 1777	Philadelphia campaign
Battle of Monmouth	June 28, 1778	Philadelphia campaign

In all of these battles, Gunby commanded the 2nd Independent Maryland Company first as a captain until December 10, 1776, when he was commissioned as lieutenant colonel and then as a full colonel when he was promoted on April 17, 1777

== Southern Campaign ==
After the unsuccessful attempt to capture Savannah, Georgia, under the command of General Benjamin Lincoln, the Southern Department of the Continental Army retreated to Charleston, South Carolina. General Sir Henry Clinton moved his forces, surrounded the city where Lincoln's army had taken refuge and cut off any chance of relief for the Continental Army. Prior to his surrender, Lincoln had been able to get messages to General Washington and the Continental Congress requesting aid. At the end of April 1780, Washington dispatched General deKalb with 1,400 Maryland and Delaware troops. The Maryland Line made up a large portion of this force.

General deKalb's forces took almost a month to descend the Chesapeake Bay and did not arrive in Petersburg, Virginia, until the middle of June, almost a month after Lincoln had surrendered his army. The Continental Congress appointed Horatio Gates to command the Southern Department. He assumed command on July 25, 1780, and immediately marched into South Carolina with the intent of engaging the British Army, now under the command of Charles Cornwallis.

=== Battle of Camden ===
After brief aggressive maneuvering which threatened the British position in the Carolinas, Cornwallis moved his forces to engage the American forces. The two armies engaged one another in the Battle of Camden on August 16, 1780, six miles north of Camden, South Carolina. Due to several tactical errors on the part of Horatio Gates, the British were able to achieve a decisive victory. The Maryland Troops, Gunby's company among them, deserted by their commander fought until they were pressed on all sides and forced to retreat. Two-fifths of the Marylanders were killed or wounded and General deKalb was mortally wounded. Prior to his death three days later, deKalb paid a glowing tribute to the Maryland Troop under his command.

=== Battle of Cowpens ===
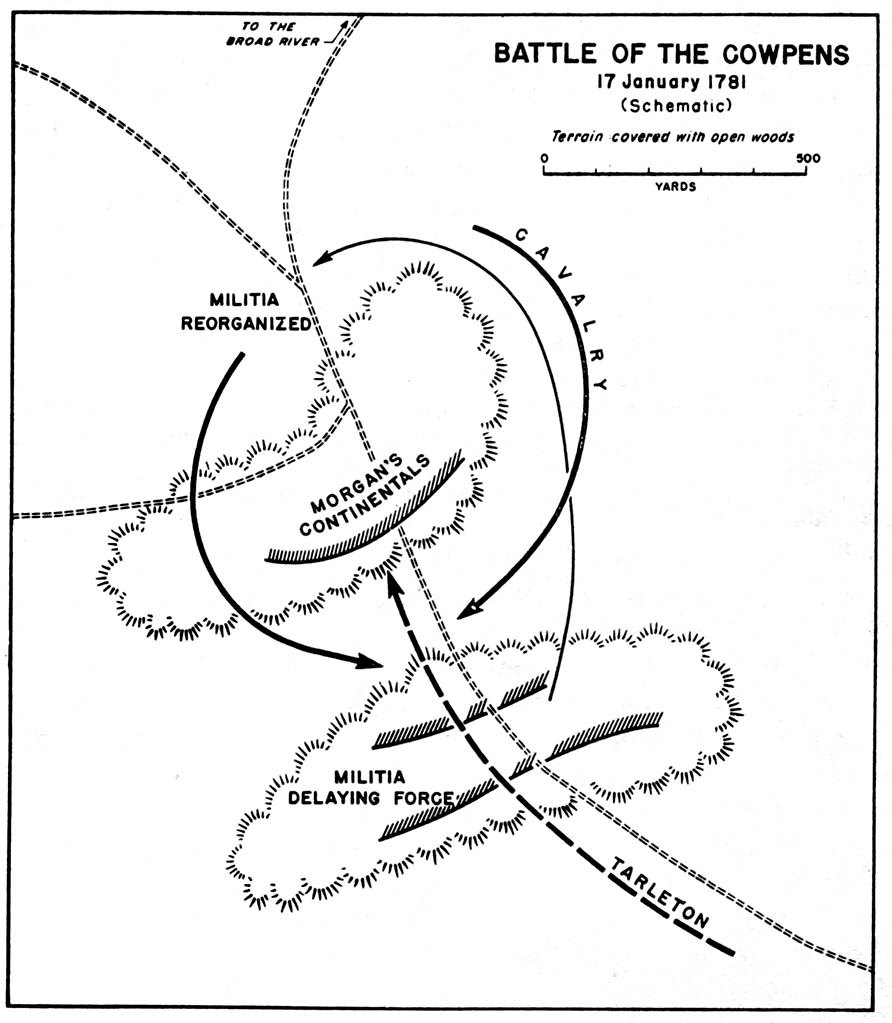
Battle of Cowpens

Nathanael Greene was appointed commander of the Southern Department on October 5, 1780, and assumed command on December 2, 1780. In early January 1781, Greene detached four companies of the 1st Maryland Regiment, to reinforce Daniel Morgan's forces. On January 17, 1781, Morgan's newly reinforced army engaged a significantly larger British force under the command of Banastre Tarleton and won a decisive victory.

Gunby was in command of his company as they charged the British 71st Regiment. The British force was completely routed and Lieutenant Colonel Howard is said to have collected seven swords surrendered to him by British officers.

=== Battle of Guilford Court House ===
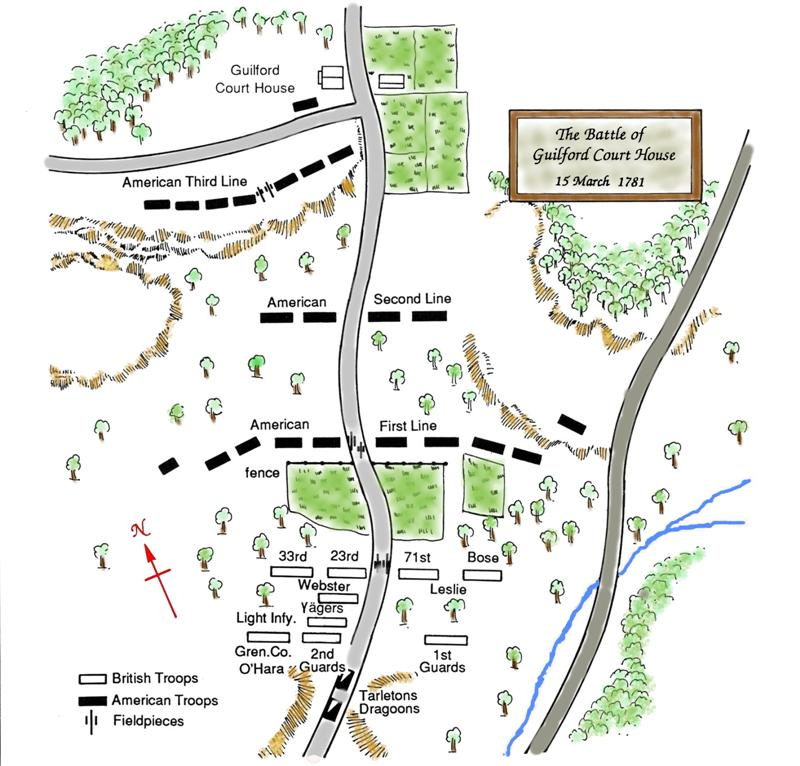
Battle of Guilford Court House

After the successful retreat across the Dan River, General Greene chose to offer battle to General Cornwallis's forces on March 15, 1781, on ground of his own choosing at Guliford Court House, inside the city limits of present-day Greensboro, North Carolina.

After the British forces had broken Greene's first line made up of North Carolina Militia and the second line made up of Virginia Militia, they threatened the third line made up by the 1st Maryland Regiment, under the command of Gunby, and the 2nd Maryland Regiment. The Brigade of Guards, under the command of a Colonel Stewart, broke through the 2nd Maryland Regiment, captured two field pieces and threatened the rear of Gunby's forces, who were already engaged with sizable force under the command of a Colonel Webster.

Gunby, his command threatened on two fronts, ordered a fierce charge and swept Webster's forces from the field. He then wheeled his troops to face the oncoming guards unit. After a brief exchange of musket fire, in which Gunby's horse was shot from under him, the 1st Maryland Regiment charged the Guards unit, who were quickly routed.

Greene, not able to see this part of the battle from his vantage point, had already ordered a retreat. Thus, unsupported, the Maryland troops were soon forced to withdraw.

== The Battle of Hobkirk's Hill ==
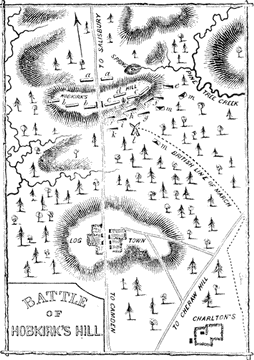
Battle of Hobkirk's Hill

After Guilford Court House, Cornwallis's force was spent and in great need of supply. He therefore moved his army towards Wilmington, North Carolina where he had previously ordered supplies to be sent. Greene pursued the British force for a short time before deciding to take his forces into South Carolina. Greene hoped that by threatening the British garrisons in the state he could force Cornwallis to pursue him and then engage the British on ground favorable to his army. When Cornwallis did not pursue the Continental Army, Greene chose to reduce the British garrisons scattered throughout South Carolina in order to force the British back into Charleston.

To this end, General Greene moved his main force—made up of two Virginia and two Maryland regiments of Continentals as well as a force of Cavalry under William Washington—with all possible speed towards Camden, South Carolina where Lord Francis Rawdon was stationed with 900 troops. Rawdon learned of Greene's approach and readied his forces to repel an attack. Upon arriving at Camden, and finding his planned assault impractical, Greene retired his forces to a low heavily wooded ridge locally called Hobkirk's Hill.

Having received intelligence from a deserter on April 24 that the Continental Artillery and Militia had been detached from Greene's main force, Rawdon decided to attack. However, on the morning of April 25, 1781 Lieutenant Colonel Carrington had brought the artillery back to Hobkirk's Hill along with a supply of provisions which were distributed to the Continental troops. At around 11 am, while many of the Continentals were occupied with cooking and washing clothes, the advanced pickets detected the British forces who had gained the American left by marching a circuit of great distance and keeping close to a swamp that was next to the ridge occupied by the Continental Army.

The advanced pickets, under Captain Robert Kirkwood, were able to delay the British advance giving Greene time to give orders and address his forces distribution. Greene placed the a Virginia Regiment under Lieutenant Colonel Campbell on the extreme right with another Virginia Regiment under Lieutenant Colonel Samuel Hawes to their left. On the extreme left, Greene placed the 5th Maryland under Lieutenant Colonel Benjamin Ford with the 1st Maryland, under Gunby's command, to their right. The artillery was placed in the center with North Carolina militia in the rear.

Once having extricated his forces from the woods and forcing the pickets to retreat, Rawdon arrayed his forces and slowly advanced up the ridge towards the waiting Continentals. Greene, perceiving the British forces were presenting a narrow front, ordered an attack. Greene instructed Campbell on the right to wheel his men to the left and engage the British on their flank with Ford to take his men and make a similar movement on the left. Greene ordered the two remaining regiments in the center to advance with bayonets and confront the enemy head on while Washington was to take his cavalry around the British left flank and attack the enemy in the rear.

During the advance of the 1st Maryland on the British left, Captain William Beatty jr. who was in command on the right of Gunby's regiment, was killed causing his company to stop their advance. Gunby ordered his men to stop their advance and fall back with the intention of reforming their line. At this time, Benjamin Ford of the 5th Maryland was mortally wounded throwing his troops into disorder. Finding their flank in disarray and being threatened by a company of Irish troops Rawdon had brought up to strengthen his flank, the Maryland troops rallied briefly to fire a few rounds and then left the field in disorder. Seeing this, Rawdon quickly rallied his flagging troops and advanced, taking the field.

== Court of inquiry ==
The day after the Battle of Hobkirk's Hill, General Greene addressed his troops and presented a pointed comment that Gunby apparently felt this was directed at him and he immediately applied for a court of inquiry to review his actions on the field. His request was granted by General Greene who named General Huger, Colonel Harrison of the artillery and Lieutenant Colonel Washington of the cavalry to conduct the review.

On May 2, the Court published their conclusions:

The Court, whereof Brigadier General Huger is president, appointed to inquire into the conduct Colonel Gunby, in the action of the 25th ultimo, report as follows, namely:

It appears to the Court that Colonel Gunby received orders to advance with his regiment and charge bayonet without firing. This order he immediately communicated to his regiment which advanced cheerfully for some distance, when a firing began on the right of the regiment, and in a short time became general through it. That soon two companies on the right of the regiment gave way. That Colonel Gunby then gave Lieutenant Colonel Howard orders to bring off the other four companies, which at that time appeared disposed to advance, except a few. That Lieutenant Colonel Howard brought off the four companies from the left and joined Colonel Gunby at the foot of the hill, about sixty yards in the rear. That Lieutenant Colonel Howard there found Colonel Gunby actively exerting himself in rallying the two companies that broke from the right, which he effected, and the regiment was again formed and gave a fire or two at enemy, which appeared on the hill in front. It also appeared from other testimony, that Colonel Gunby, at several other times, was active in rallying and forming his troops.

It appears, from the above report, that Colonel Gunby's spirit and activity were unexceptionable. But his order for the regiment to retire, which broke the line, was extremely improper and unmilitary, and, in all probability the only cause why we did not obtain a complete victory

Greene was firm in his belief that Gunby was the sole reason for the Continental Army's loss at Hobkirk Hill. On August 6, 1781, in a letter to Joseph Reed, Greene stated his position bluntly:

The troops were not to blame in the Camden affair; Gunby was the sole cause of the defeat; and I found him much more blameable afterwards, than I represented him in my public letters. The action of Camden was much more bloody, according to the numbers engaged, than that of Guilford on both sides. The enemy had more than one third of their whole force engaged either killed or wounded, and we had no less than a quarter. Depend upon it, our actions have been bloody and severe, according to the force engaged, and we should have had Lord Rawdon and his whole command prisoners in three minutes, if Colonel Gunby had not ordered his regiment to retire, the greatest part of which were advancing rapidly at the time they were ordered off. I was almost frantic with vexation at the disappointment. Fortune has not been our friend

Henry Lee, "Light Horse Harry", gave a different opinion in his memoirs of the war stating that the Maryland troops abandoned their position contrary to the efforts and example of Gunby and the other Continental officers on the field.

It has been pointed out that the tribunal paid no disrespect to Colonel Gunby, pointing out his "spirit and activity"; however, it clearly found him at fault for making an error in military tactics. Both the tribunal's and Greene's assertion that Gunby's order to his regiment to retire and reform was the sole cause for the Continental line breaking does not take into account that the two companies on Gunby's right had already broken the line and were falling back in confusion upon the death of Captain Beatty. The historian Benson John Lossing attributes the entire loss of victory to the death of Captain Beatty.

Nor did the tribunal or Greene appear to accept that Gunby's order for the four companies that were still advancing to reform their line to be a proper military tactic. Henry Lee, however, points out that this same maneuver had been performed by Daniel Morgan at Cowpens.

In addition, as mentioned in the tribunal's report, Gunby was apparently successful in rallying his troops who then fired one or two rounds at the oncoming British soldiers which would seem to indicate that the Maryland troops were not panicked as Greene's comments, the tribunal's report and Henry Lee's account seem to allude.

Lee offers another reason for the American defeat at Hobkirk's Hill, suggesting that Greene's order to the Cavalry under Williams to circle around the British and attack them in the rear was a plausible explanation for the loss. As explained in his memoirs, if the Cavalry had been held in reserve, rather than order to attack the rear of the British force where they were held up by Rowsan's baggage train, William's troops could have been used to reinforce the line and reversing the gains made by the British reserve that had already been committed to the battle.

Regardless that both the tribunal and Greene found fault with Gunby for his actions at Hobkirk Hill, Gunby was retained as commander of the 1st Maryland Regiment.

== Later war ==
The Maryland Line continued to distinguish itself in the later battles of the Southern theater of the American Revolutionary War with Gunby continuing to command the 1st Maryland Regiment.

Of the Maryland Line's actions at the Battle of Eutaw Springs, General Greene wrote in his official report of the engagement:

Nothing could exceed the gallantry and firmness of both officers and soldiers upon this occasion. They preserved their order and pressed on with such unshaken resolution that they bore down all before them.

Gunby continued in the capacity of commander of the 1st Maryland Regiment until the regiment was furloughed and all of its business concluded. Prior to his resigning his commission, he was given a brevet promotion to brigadier general on September 30, 1783.

== Life after war ==
After mustering out of the Continental Army, Gunby returned home to Somerset County, Maryland. His father, who died in 1788, bequeathed him a large farm in Worcester County, Maryland, two miles south of Snow Hill. Unlike many of his contemporaries, Gunby avoided politics or using his fame from the war for personal gain. He kept to his farm devoting himself to agriculture. For some years he supported at least three families of Maryland officers killed during the Carolina Campaigns. Gunby was also known to help poor families build houses and awaiting their convenience for payment, promoting the construction of new roads, furnishing horse teams for those in need and contributing toward the maintenance of places of worship. Brigadier General Gunby was admitted as an original member of the Society of the Cincinnati of Maryland.
