= 2nd Independent Maryland Company – Somerset County =

2nd Independent Maryland Company Somerset County
- Active: 1776–1781
- Allegiance: Continental Congress of the United States
- Type: Infantry
- Size: 103 soldiers and officers
- Part of: Maryland Line
- Engagements: American Revolutionary War: Battle of White Plains; Battle of Trenton; Second Battle of Trenton; Battle of Brandywine; Battle of Monmouth

Commanders
- Notable commanders: Colonel John Gunby

The Second Independent Maryland Company - Somerset County was an infantry company formed on the orders of the Maryland Convention for the protection of the province during the American Revolutionary War.

== History ==
On January 1, 1776, the Maryland Convention, meeting in Frederick Town order created seven "independent" infantry companies, one of which was Second Independent Maryland. On the following day, the convention elected the officer corps of the company with John Gunby as captain, Uriah Forrest as 1st lieutenant, William Bowie as second lieutenant and Benjamin Brooks as third lieutenant. The troops of the company were made up men from Somerset County, Maryland and numbered a hundred and three men, including officers.

In the early part of the war, the Second Independent Maryland Company spent much of their time patrolling southern Maryland and breaking up Tory camps which were to be found on the lower part of the peninsula as Somerset County was a leading Tory stronghold.

On August 16, the Maryland Council of Safety dispatched the Second Independent Maryland Company to reinforce Washington's forces deployed around New York.

Although they did not arrive in time for the Battle of Long Island, the Second Independent Maryland Company participated in the Battle of White Plains, the Battle of Trenton, the Second Battle of Trenton, Battle of Brandywine and the Battle of Monmouth as part of the Maryland Line, before being absorbed into the 2nd Maryland Regiment in 1781.
