= Maryland Line =

Formation within the Continental Army

The "Maryland Line" was a formation within the Continental Army, formed and authorized by the Second Continental Congress, meeting in the "Old Pennsylvania State House" (later known as "Independence Hall") in Philadelphia, Pennsylvania, in June 1775.

== Background ==
Colonel George Washington, delegate and formerly of the Virginia Regiment of the colonial militia, served as commander-in-chief of the colonial forces. Washington assumed command at Cambridge, Massachusetts, of the various units from several of the American colonies which surrounded Boston, laying siege to the British Army in June 1775. Washington's previous military experience had been during the late French and Indian War (1754–1763).

Not all Continental infantry regiments raised in a state were part of a state quota. On December 27, 1776, the Second Continental Congress gave commanding General Washington temporary control over certain military decisions that the Congress ordinarily regarded as its own prerogative. These "dictatorial powers" included the authority to recruit and raise 16 additional Continental infantry regiments at large. Forman's, Gist's, Grayson's, and Hartley's Regiments were partially drawn from Maryland. Other Continental infantry regiments and smaller units, also unrelated to a state quota, were raised as needed for special or temporary service.

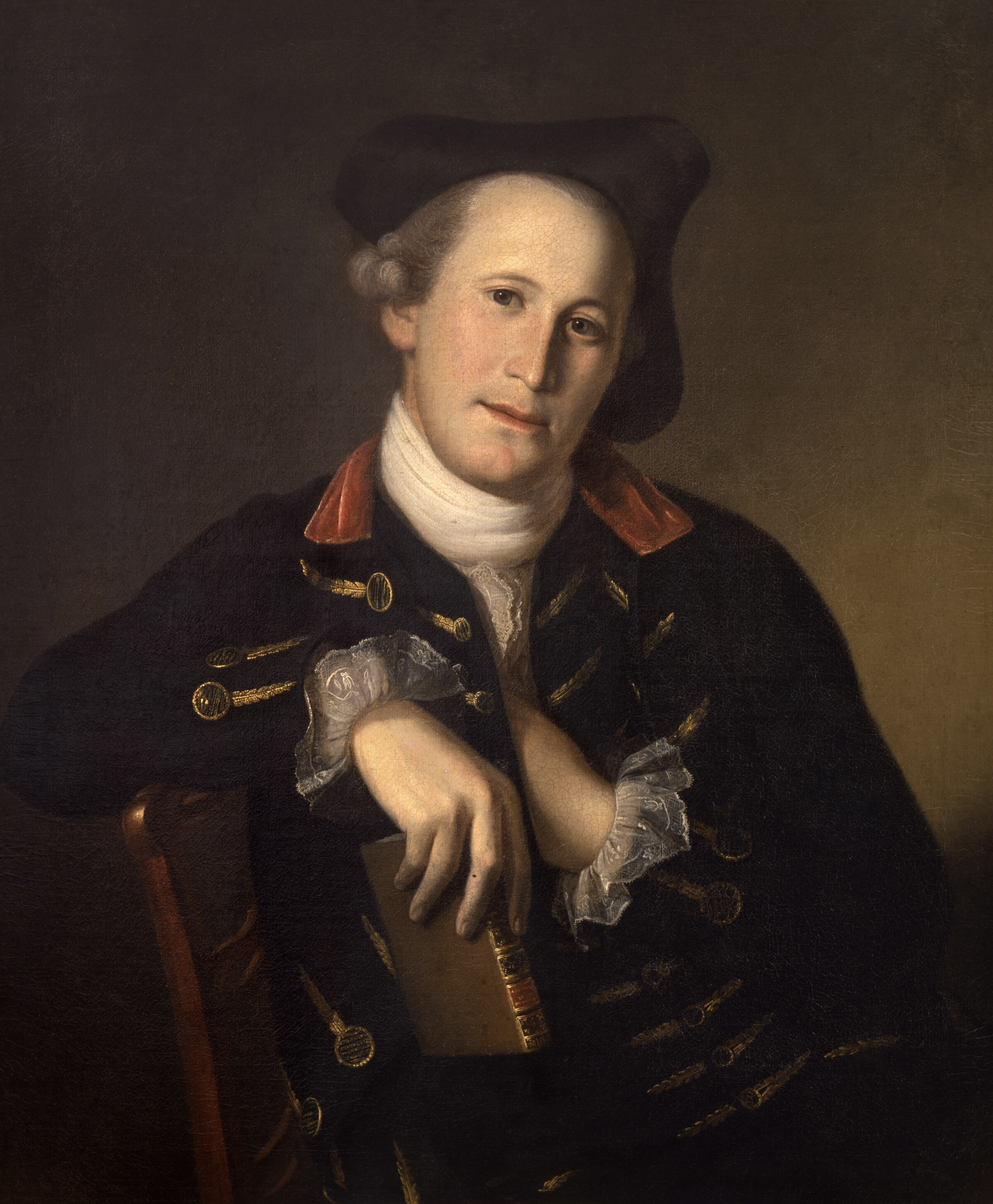
Mordecai Gist

== History ==
Under the assumption that paid soldiers furnished with rations and suits of clothes would be better soldiers, on January 18, 1776, the Maryland Provincial Convention established the Maryland Line as a regiment of uniformed regulars. According to Maryland state archivist Ryan Polk, what distinguished the Maryland troops from other colonial levies was the time they spent drilling before joining the ranks of the Continental Army. This resulted in a disciplined, cohesive unit.

The term "Maryland Line" referred to the quota of numbered infantry regiments assigned to Maryland at various times by the Continental Congress. These, together with similar contingents from the other 12 colonies, formed the "Continental Line". The concept was particularly important in relation to the promotion of commissioned officers. Officers of the Continental Army below the rank of brigadier general were ordinarily ineligible for promotion except in the line of their own state.

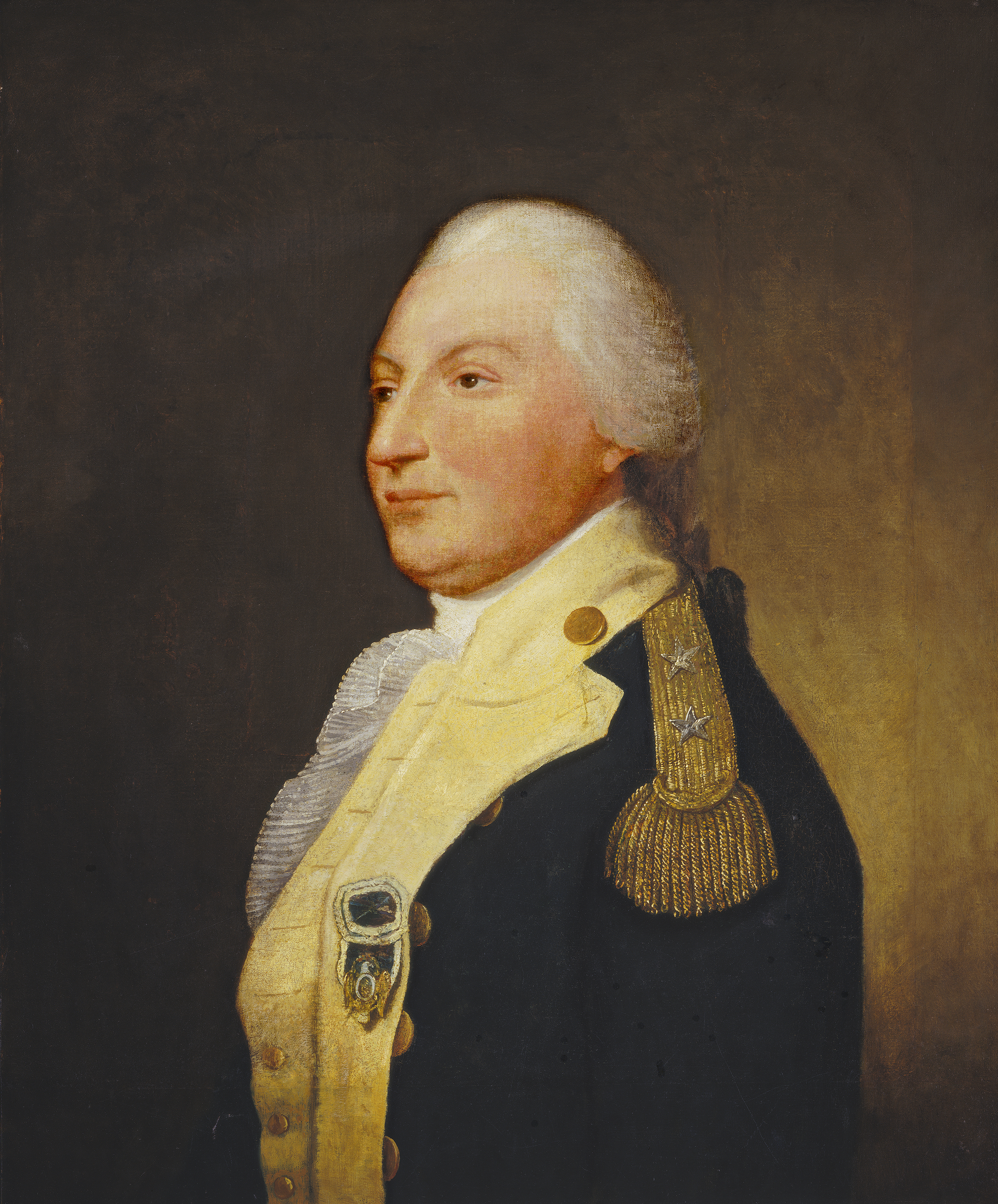
William Smallwood

The "Maryland Line" was assigned a quota of eight regiments in 1777, which was reduced to five in 1781. The regiments of the line were:

- 1st Maryland Regiment, disbanded in 1783
- 2nd Maryland Regiment, disbanded in 1783
- 3rd Maryland Regiment, disbanded in 1783
- 4th Maryland Regiment, disbanded in 1783
- 5th Maryland Regiment, disbanded in 1783
- 6th Maryland Regiment, disbanded in 1781
- 7th Maryland Regiment, disbanded in 1781
- German Battalion (counted as half a regiment against the quota), disbanded in 1781
- Maryland and Virginia Rifle Regiment (counted as half a regiment against the quota), disbanded in 1781
- 2nd Independent Maryland Company – Somerset County absorbed into the 2nd Maryland Regiment in 1781

According to popular tradition, Washington expressed his high esteem for the Maryland Line after their heroic stand at the Battle of Long Island. Because of the long service of the high quality regiments, Washington referred to the Maryland units as his "Old Line", giving the state of Maryland one of its nicknames as "The Old Line State".

== Action ==
The Maryland Line protected the evacuation of Washington's troops across the East River to Manhattan at the Battle of Long Island. On August 27, 1776, members of the 1st Maryland Regiment under the command of Major Mordecai Gist repeatedly charged a numerically superior British force, allowing Washington to successfully evacuate the bulk of his troops to Manhattan. Of the approximately 270 men of the so-called Maryland 400, fewer than a dozen made it back to the American lines. Two months later at the Battle of White Plains, William Smallwood's 1st Maryland Regiment, along with regiments from New York and Delaware, reinforced Chatterton's Hill, covering the retreat of other troops across the Bronx River.

In the Battle of Camden, South Carolina, on August 16, 1780, Major General Horatio Gates, a former British officer, placed Gist's 2nd Maryland Regiment on the right flank, in traditional British deployment, the place of honor. The 1st Maryland Regiment under Smallwood was held in reserve. One hundred eighty Marylanders saw action at the January 17, 1781, Battle of Cowpens.

== Sources ==
- Polk, Ryan. "Holding the Line: The Origin of the 'the Old Line State'". Maryland State Archives, Annapolis, 2005
- Wright, Robert K. - "The Continental Army", Washington, D.C.: United States Army Center of Military History, 1983. Available on internet website: online.
- Steuart, Rieman. A History of the Maryland Line in the Revolutionary War, 1775-1783. Society of the Cincinnati of Maryland. 1969
