= 4th Maryland Regiment =

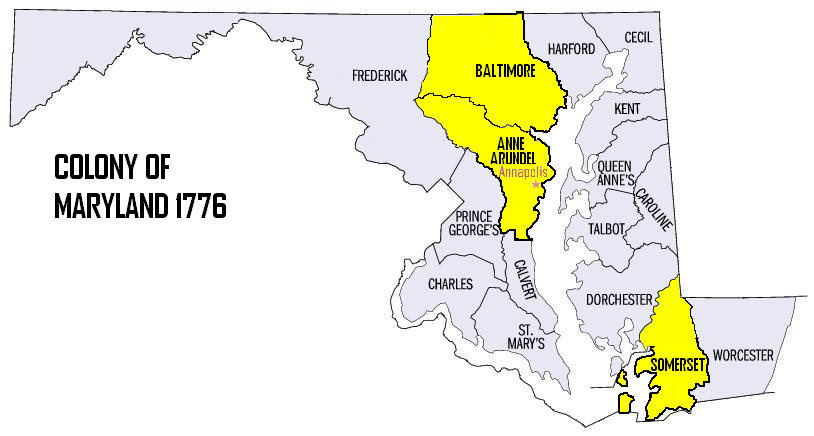
- Recruitment areas
- Active: 27 March 1776 – 1 January 1783
- Disbanded: 1 January 1783
- Allegiance: Continental Congress of the United States
- Type: Infantry
- Size: 728 soldiers (1776) re-organized to 611 soldiers (1781)
- Part of: Maryland Line
- Engagements: American Revolutionary War (1775–1783): Battle of Germantown (1777); Battle of Monmouth (1778); Battle of Camden (1780); Battle of Guilford Court House (1781); Yorktown (1781)

Commanders
- Notable commanders: Colonel Josias Hall

The 4th Maryland Regiment was organized on 27 March 1777 as a part of eight companies from Baltimore, Anne Arundel and Somerset Counties. It was assigned to the 2nd Maryland Brigade—a part of the Main Army—on 22 May 1777. Assigned 27 December 1776 to the Main Army. Authorized 16 September 1776 in the Continental Army as the 4th Maryland Regiment. Reorganized 12 May 1779 to consist of nine companies. (2d Maryland Brigade relieved 5 April 1780 from the Main Army and assigned to the Southern Department.) Relieved 1 January 1781 from the Maryland Brigade. Assigned 24 September 1781 to Gist's Brigade of the Main Army. (Gist's Brigade relieved 27 October 1781 from the Main Army and assigned to the Southern Department.) Relieved 4 January 1782 from Gist's Brigade and assigned to the Maryland Brigade, an element of the Southern Department. Disbanded 1 January 1783 at Charleston, South Carolina.
