= 7th Maryland Regiment =

- Active: 1776–1783
- Allegiance: Continental Congress of the United States
- Type: Infantry
- Size: 728 soldiers(1776) re-organized to 611 soldiers(1781)
- Part of: Maryland Line
- Engagements: Monmouth, Camden, Guilford Court House

Commanders
- Notable commanders: Colonel John Gunby

The 7th Maryland Regiment was authorized on 16 September 1776, for service with the Continental Army and was assigned on 27 December 1776. The regiment was composed of eight companies of volunteers organized from Frederick and Baltimore counties of the colony of Maryland.

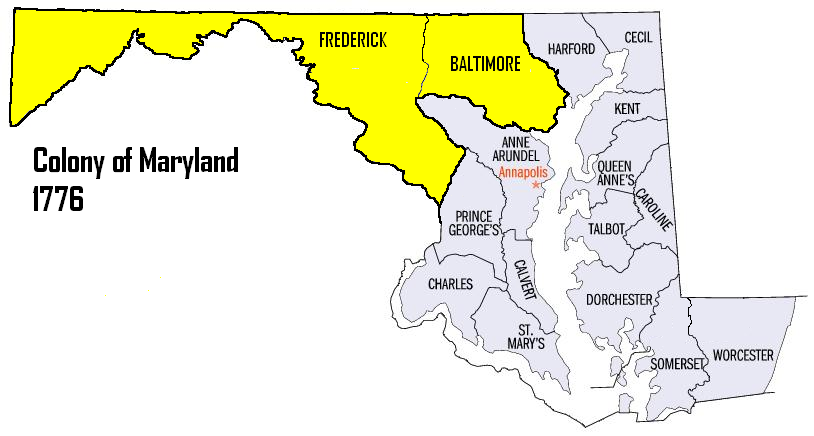
Recruitment Areas

On 22 May 1777, it was assigned to the 1st Maryland Brigade. Re-organized on 12 May 1779 to nine companies. The 1st Maryland Brigade was reassigned to the Southern Department on 5 April 1780. The regiment participated in the Philadelphia Campaign which occurred during 1777-1778 and the Southern Theater which occurred during 1775–1782.

The 7th Maryland Regiment was involved in several major battles including: Battle of Brandywine, Battle of Germantown, Battle of Monmouth, Battle of Camden and the Battle of Guilford Court House.

They also spent from December 19, 1777, to June 19, 1778 encamped with General George Washington at Valley Forge.

The regiment was disbanded 1 January 1783, at Annapolis, Maryland.

== Legacy ==
On June 18, 2026, a member of the 7th Maryland Regiment and the first Revolutionary War combatant identified using genetic genealogy was announced in Linthicum, Maryland. Private John Pumphrey was the orphaned son of a prominent Anne Arundel County, Maryland family who was killed at the Battle of Camden on August 16, 1780.
