= 1st Maryland Regiment =

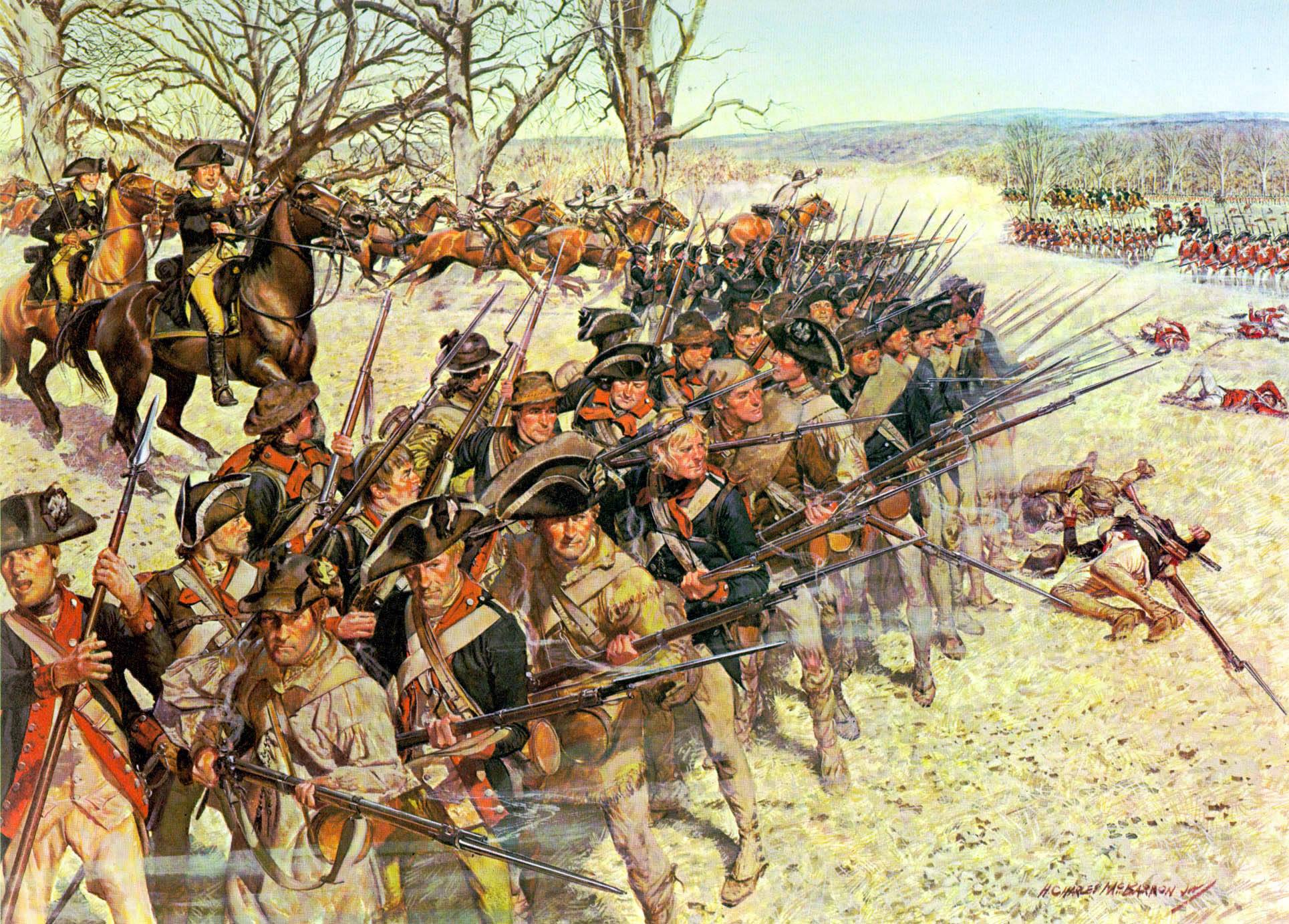
- 1st Maryland Regiment holding the line at the Battle of Guilford Court House
- Active: 1776–1783
- Country: United States of America
- Allegiance: Maryland
- Type: Infantry
- Size: 728 soldiers (1776) re-organized to 611 soldiers (1781)
- Part of: Maryland Line
- Engagements: American Revolutionary War; Battle of Long Island; Battle of White Plains; Battle of Trenton; Battle of Princeton; Battle of Brandywine; Battle of Germantown; Battle of Monmouth; Battle of Camden; Battle of Cowpens; Battle of Guilford Courthouse; Battle of Hobkirk's Hill; Siege of Ninety Six; Battle of Eutaw Springs

Commanders
- Notable commanders: Colonel William Smallwood; Colonel John Gunby

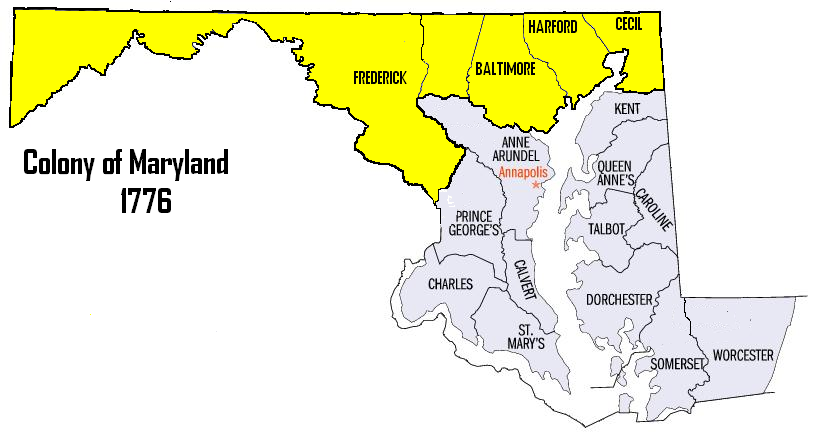
Recruitment areas

The 1st Maryland Regiment (Smallwood's Regiment) originated with the authorization of a Maryland Battalion of the Maryland State Troops on 14 January 1776. It was organized in the spring at Baltimore, Maryland (three companies) and Annapolis, Maryland (six companies) under the command of Colonel William Smallwood consisting of eight companies and one light infantry company from the northern and western counties of the colony of Maryland.

== History ==
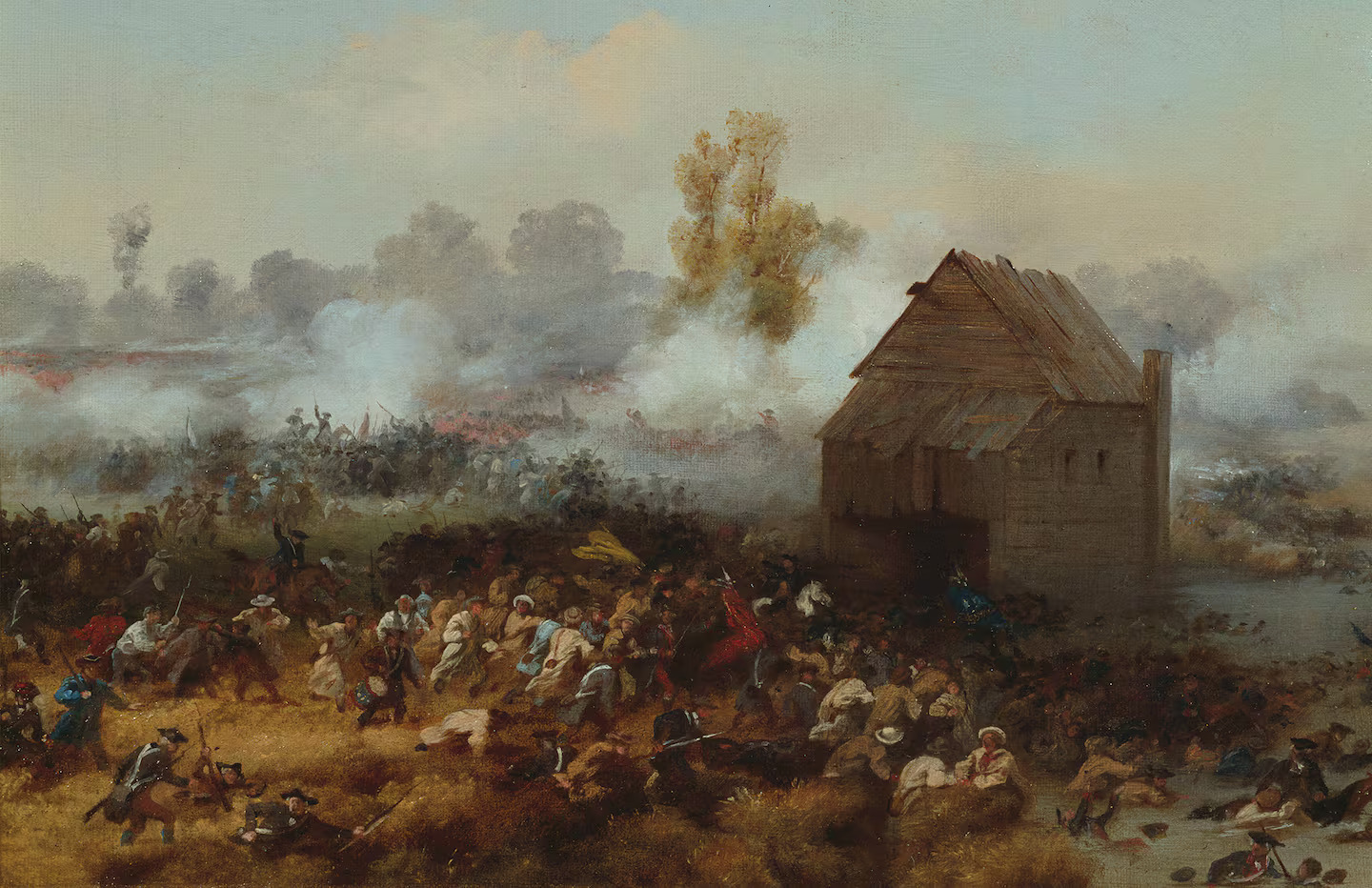
4 Companies of the Lord Stirling and Mordecai Gist's 1st Maryland, "The Maryland 400" in a rear-guard action, counter-attacked the surprise British breakthrough at the Battle of Long Island 6 times in order to enable of the rest of the brigade to escape. Painting by Alonzo Chappel, 1858.

On 6 July 1776, the Maryland Battalion was assigned to the main Continental Army. On 12 August 1776, it was assigned to Stirling's Brigade and five days later (17 August 1776) adopted into the main Continental Army. On 31 August, the Maryland Battalion was reassigned from Stirling's Brigade to McDougall's Brigade. On 19 September 1776 the Maryland Independent Companies were assigned to the Maryland Battalion. This element was relieved from McDougall's Brigade on 10 November 1776. From 10 December 1776 to January 1777, the element was assigned to Mercer's Brigade. In January 1777 this element was re-organized to eight companies and was re-designated as the 1st Maryland Regiment and assigned to the 1st Maryland Brigade on 22 May 1777 of the main continental Army. On 12 May 1779, the regiment was re-organized to nine companies. On 5 April 1780, the 1st Maryland Brigade was reassigned to the Southern Department. On 1 January 1781, it was reassigned to the Maryland Brigade of the Southern Department. The regiment would see action during the New York Campaign, Battle of Trenton, Battle of Princeton, Battle of Brandywine, Battle of Germantown, Battle of Monmouth, Battle of Camden and the Battle of Guilford Court House. The regiment was furloughed 27 July 1783 at Baltimore and disbanded on 15 November 1783.

The Maryland Battalion distinguished itself at the Battle of Long Island by single-handedly covering the retreat of the American forces against numerically superior British and Hessian forces, with a group of men memorialized as the Maryland 400. Thereafter, General George Washington relied heavily upon the Marylanders as one of the few reliable fighting units in the early Continental Army. For this reason, Maryland is sometimes known as "The Old Line State." The lineage of this unit is perpetuated by the 175th Infantry Regiment, Maryland Army National Guard.

== Battle of Brooklyn ==
The Maryland Regiment had joined the Continental Army barely two weeks before the Battle of Long Island. Unlike most of Washington's Army, the Maryland contingent had been well drilled at home and were so well equipped – they even had bayonets, a rarity for the Army – that the Regiment was known at home as the Dandy Fifth, and to the rest of the Army as "macaronis", the then current word for dandies. The Marylanders were put under Lord Stirling's brigade. When the British under Cornwallis surprised the Americans by circling around their rear, Stirling ordered all forces, other than the Marylanders, who were outside the fortified position on Brooklyn Heights to retreat there leaving behind himself and 4 companies of the 1st Maryland. Stirling led these men (who would come to be known as "The Maryland 400") against Cornwallis' 2,000 British soldiers who were massed around the Old Stone House, a thick-walled fieldstone and brick fortification near today's Fifth Avenue and 3rd Street that had been built in 1699 to withstand Indian raids.

In fierce fighting, the Marylanders charged the British forces six times to give their comrades time to make their way to safety with the rest of Washington's army in the Heights. Twice they managed to drive the British from the house, but as more British reinforcements arrived and the Marylanders casualties mounted, they finally had to give up the assault and try to get to safety themselves. Only Major Mordecai Gist and nine others managed to reach the American lines. Of the others, 256 lay dead in front of the Old Stone House and more than 100 were wounded/and or captured. The bravery of the Maryland Regiment earned them the name "immortals". The dead were buried in a mass grave consisting of six trenches in a farm field. The gravesite is located on what is now Third Avenue between 7th and 8th Streets. Until the widening of Third Avenue in 1910, the site was marked by a tablet that read: "Burial place of ye 256 Maryland soldiers who fell in ye combat at ye Cortelyou House on ye 27th day of August 1776." The result of the brief battle was stunning for the Americans. More than a thousand men were killed, captured, or missing. Generals Stirling and Sullivan were in the enemy's hands. The battalion had lost more than 250 of their number. Most of the Marylanders' casualties occurred in the retreat and desperate covering action at the Cortelyou House. Ultimately, of the original Maryland 400 muster, 96 returned, with only 35 fit for duty.

Historian, Thomas Field, writing in 1869, "The Battle of Long Island," called the stand of the Marylanders "an hour more precious to liberty than any other in history." Four companies of the 1st Maryland stood as the final anchor of the crumbled American front line, and their heroic action not only saved many of their fellows but afforded Washington critical respite to regroup and withdraw his battered troops to Manhattan and continue the struggle for independence.

Over time, the farm became the site of a Red Devil paint factory, and the burial grounds became part of a factory courtyard open to the sky because of a deed restriction relating to the grave. More time passed. The paint factory gave way to an auto repair shop and the courtyard was roofed over. Today the heroes whom Washington himself lamented lie under the floor of the building that had housed the auto repair shop. They lie in their unmarked grave miles from a Stanford White monument to their sacrifice in the form of a marble shaft topped with a sphere that stands at the foot of Lookout Hill in Prospect Park. It was erected in 1895 as a gift of the Maryland Society of the Sons of the American Revolution. The Old Stone House survived the battle and in later years became the first clubhouse of the baseball team that came to be known as the Brooklyn Dodgers. It was destroyed in the 1890s, and rebuilt in the 1930s.

== Battle of Cowpens ==
When Major General Nathanael Greene took command of the Southern theater of the war, his army numbered 1482 men present. Only 949 were Continental regulars, most of whom were in the "Maryland Line" regiment. Three companies of the Marylanders were in Lt. Col. John Eager Howard's battalion. They participated extensively at Cowpens.
