= 2nd Maryland Regiment =

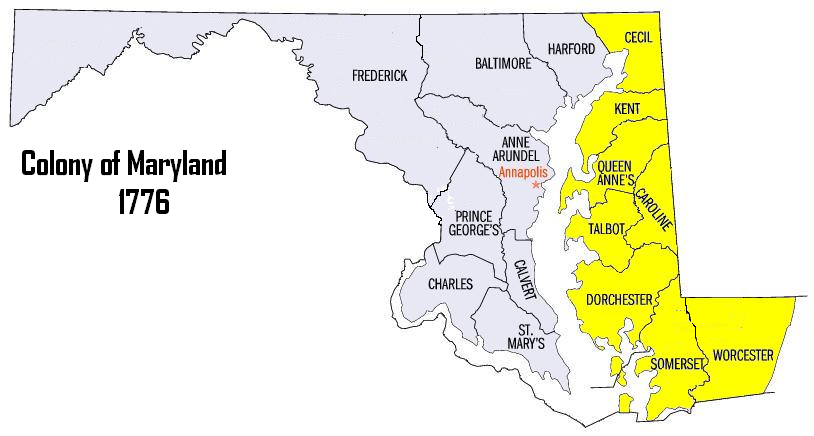
- Recruitment Areas
- Active: 1776–1783
- Allegiance: Continental Congress of the United States
- Type: Infantry
- Size: 728 soldiers(1776) re-organized to 611 soldiers(1781)
- Part of: Maryland Line
- Engagements: Monmouth; Battle of Camden and Guilford Court House

Commanders
- Notable commanders: Colonel Thomas Price; Colonel John Gunby; Colonel John Eager Howard

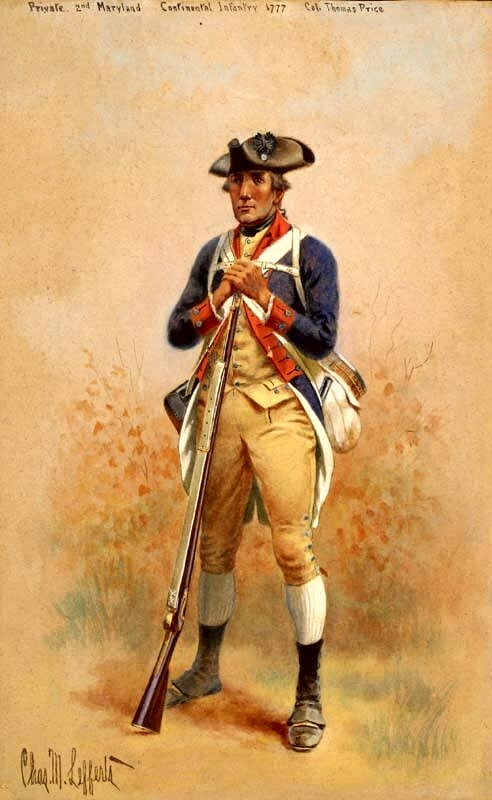
Private, 2nd Maryland Infantry

The 2nd Maryland Regiment origins were authorized on 14 January 1776 in the Maryland State Troops as seven independent companies. From 7 to 14 March 1776 the companies were organized from various counties from the eastern region of the colony of Maryland. From 6 July to 15 August 1776 the companies were assigned to the main Continental Army and officially adopted on 17 August 1776. In January 1777 the seven companies were organized as the 2nd Maryland Regiment with one additional company added. On 22 May 1777 the regiment was assigned to the 2nd Maryland Brigade in the main Continental Army. On 12 May 1779 the regiment was re-organized to nine companies. The 2nd Maryland Brigade was reassigned to the Southern Department on 5 April 1780. On 1 January 1781 the regiment was reassigned to the Maryland Brigade of the Southern Department. The regiment would see action during the New York Campaign, Battle of Trenton, Battle of Princeton, Battle of Brandywine, Battle of Germantown, Battle of Monmouth, Battle of Camden and the Battle of Guilford Court House. the regiment was furloughed 1 January 1783 at Charleston, South Carolina and disbanded on 15 November 1783.
