= David Ramsay (historian) =

American physician and historian

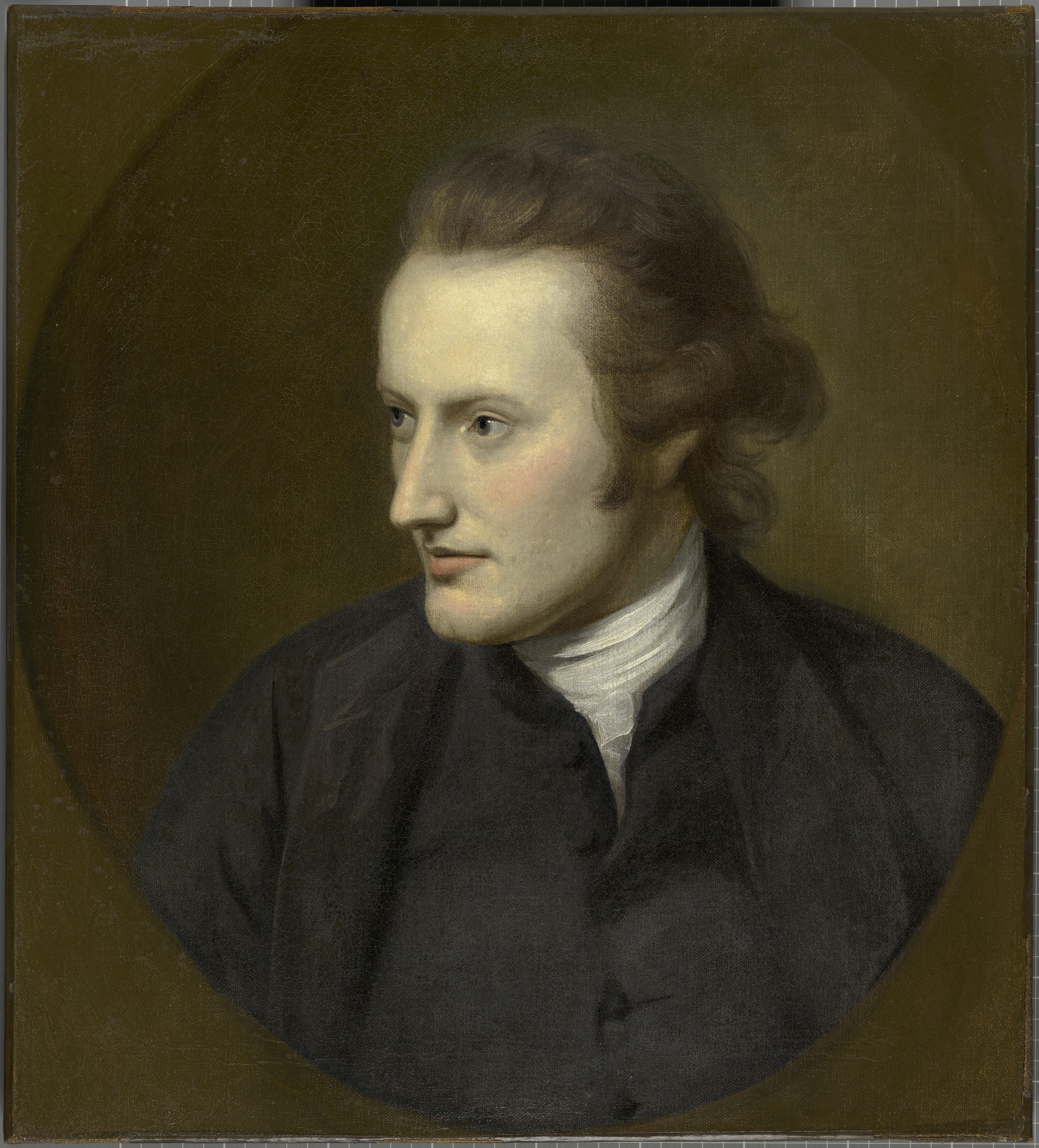
- Portrait by Charles Willson Peale, c. 1771

Member of the Continental Congress from South Carolina
- In office November 23, 1785 – May 12, 1786

President of the South Carolina Senate
- In office 1792–1797

Personal details
- Born: David Ramsay; April 2, 1749 Dunmore, Pennsylvania, British America
- Died: May 8, 1815 (aged 66) Charleston, South Carolina, U.S.
- Cause of death: Assassination
- Spouses: Sabina Ellis (m. 1775; died 1776) Frances Witherspoon (m. 1783; died 1784) Martha Laurens (m. 1787; died 1811)
- Relatives: Henry Laurens (father-in-law)
- Education: Princeton University (BA); University of Pennsylvania (MD)
- Known for: Assisted the physician practices of Benjamin Waterhouse and Valentine Seaman regarding the smallpox vaccine

David Ramsay (April 2, 1749 – May 8, 1815) was an American physician, public official, and historian from Charleston, South Carolina. He was one of the first major historians of the American Revolutionary War. During the Revolution he served in the South Carolina legislature until he was captured by the British. After his release, he served as a delegate to the Continental Congress in 1782–1783 and again in 1785–1786. Afterwards, he served in the state House and Senate until retiring from public service. In 1803, Ramsay was elected a member of the American Philosophical Society in Philadelphia. He was murdered in 1815 by a mentally ill man whom Ramsay had examined as a physician. He was the first American politician to be assassinated.

== Early life and family ==
David Ramsay was born in Lancaster County, Pennsylvania, the son of a Scottish emigrant. His brother was Nathaniel Ramsey, a Congressman and a brother-in-law of painter Charles Willson Peale.

He attended college at Princeton and graduated in 1765. In 1773, he received his medical degree from the University of Pennsylvania and an honorary degree in 1780 while being held prisoner by the British. Ramsay settled in Charleston, South Carolina where he built a large practice as a physician.

Ramsay's first two marriages were brief, both ending with the death of his wife after one year. In 1775, he married Sabina Ellis (b. 1753), and in 1783, he married Frances Witherspoon (b. 1759). His second wife was the daughter of John Witherspoon, a signer of the Declaration of Independence and president of Princeton (then the College of New Jersey).

On January 28, 1787, Ramsay married Martha Laurens (1759–1811), daughter of Henry Laurens, a wealthy Charleston planter and Revolutionary War statesman who had been president of the Second Continental Congress. Through this marriage, Ramsay also became related to Ralph Izard, John Rutledge, Arthur Middleton, Daniel Huger, Lewis Morris, and South Carolina governor Charles Pinckney. David and Martha Laurens Ramsay had eleven children, eight of whom survived to adulthood.

== Military and political service ==
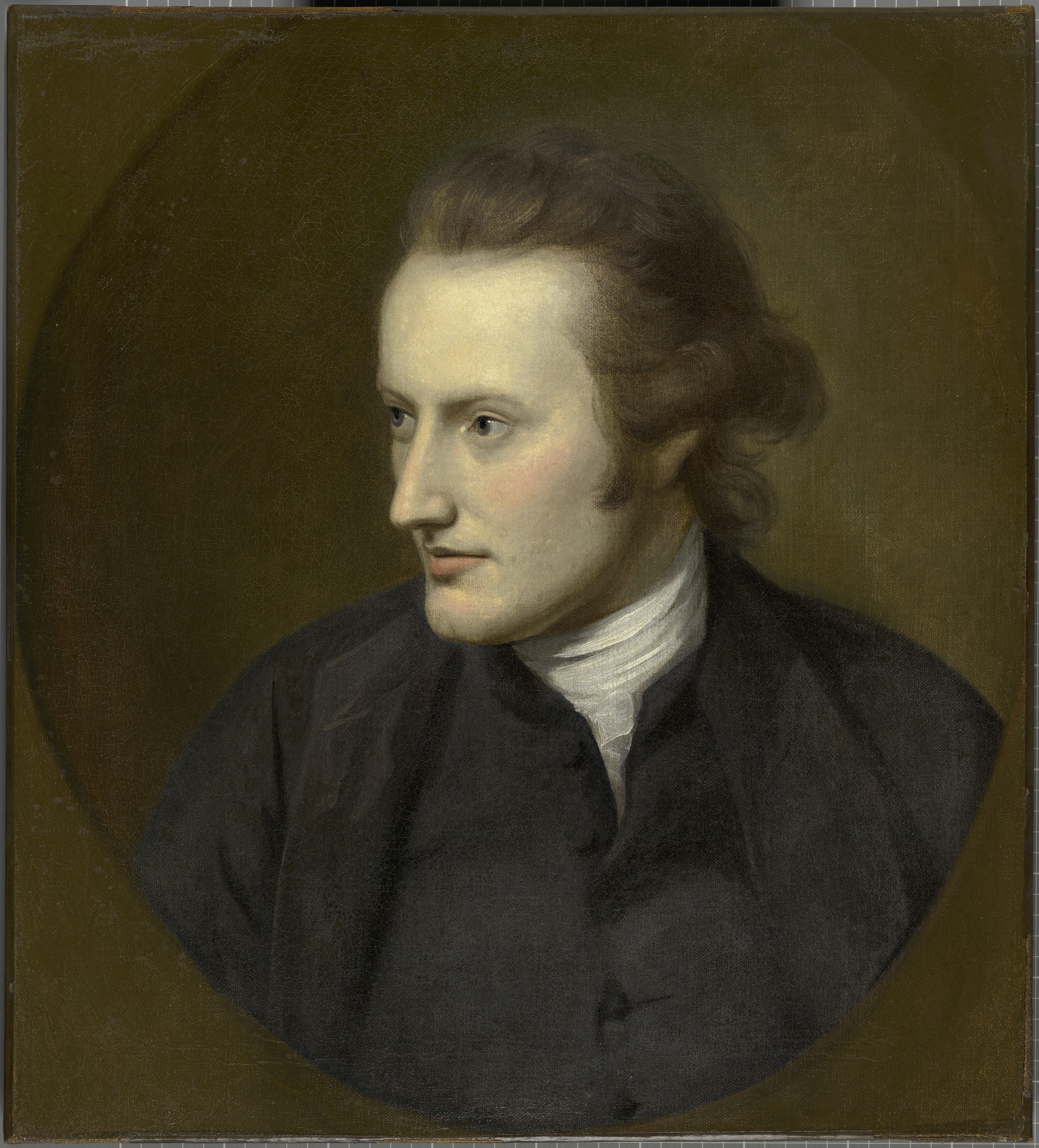
Portrait by Charles Willson Peale, 1771

During the American Revolutionary War, Ramsay served from 1776 to 1783 as a member of the South Carolina legislature.

During the Siege of Charleston in 1780, when Charleston was attacked by the British, Ramsay served with the South Carolina militia as a field surgeon. He was captured when the British occupied Charleston, and was imprisoned for nearly a year at St. Augustine, Florida, until he was exchanged.

Ramsay served as a delegate to the Continental Congress from 1782 to 1786. In the absence of its chairman, John Hancock, Ramsay served as president pro tempore of the Congress of the Confederation from November 23, 1785 to May 12, 1786. He was a candidate for South Carolina's 1st congressional district in 1788, finishing last of three candidates.

In the 1790s, Ramsay served three terms in the South Carolina Senate and was its president. During this time, Ramsay was nominated to the U.S. Senate, but his nomination was defeated on account of his abolitionist leanings.

== Historical writing ==
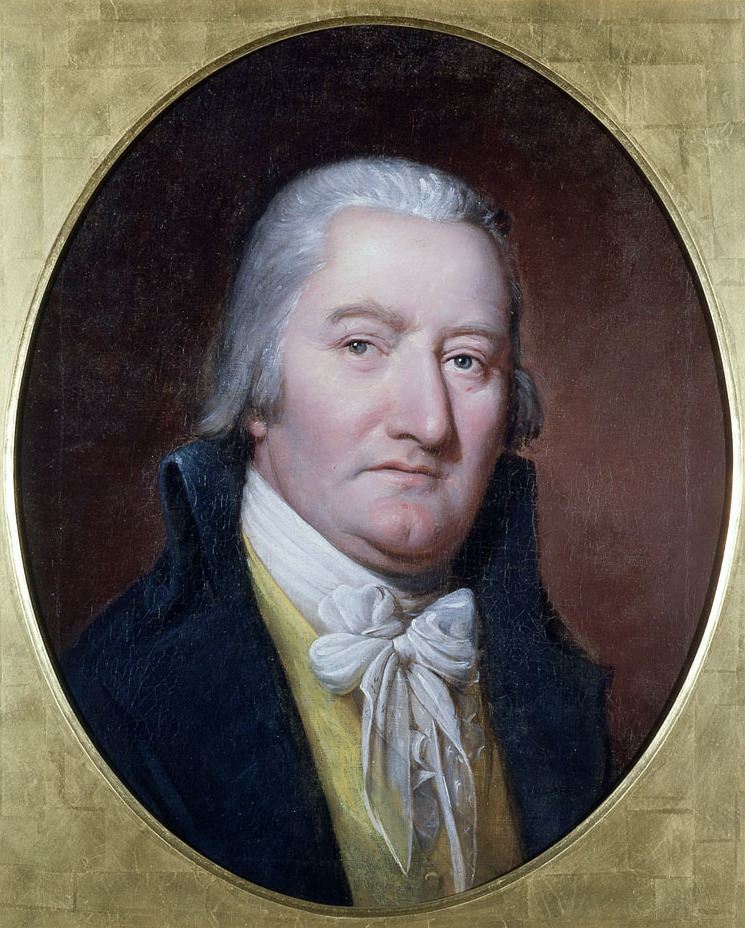
Portrait by Rembrandt Peale, 1796

In his own day, Ramsay was better known as a historian and author than as a politician. He was one of the American Revolution's first major historians, who wrote with knowledge and insights acquired by being personally involved in the events of the American Revolution.

His major historical works included:

- History of the Revolution of South Carolina (1785, two volumes)
- History of the American Revolution (1789, two volumes)
- A Dissertation on the Manners of Acquiring the Character and Privileges of a Citizen (1789)
- Life of Washington (1807)
- History of South Carolina (1809, two volumes)
- History of the United States (1816–1817, three volumes) – published posthumously
- Universal History Americanized (1819, twelve volumes, including History of the United States as the first 3 volumes)

In 1811, six weeks after the death of his wife Martha Laurens Ramsay, he published her diary and private letters under the title Memoirs of the Life of Martha Laurens Ramsay. Her memoirs remain historically valuable as a chronicle of the life of a well-educated Southern woman during the American Revolutionary War and the early years of the nation, including while she took her mother's place as hostess for her father's political gatherings in the 1780s.

=== Critical response ===
Ramsay's History of the American Revolution was one of the first and most accomplished histories to appear in the aftermath of that event, according to Karen O'Brien in 1994. O'Brien wrote that Ramsay's history challenges American exceptionalist literary frameworks by presenting itself within the European Enlightenment historical tradition, reflecting Ramsay's belief that the United States would have no historical destiny beyond typical patterns of European political and cultural development. Epic portrayals of American history in the 19th century were more the product of New England's historiographic traditions coupled with German historical thought, treating national character as a historical agent, rather than a historical result as Ramsay suggests. Ramsay's history, then, is better considered the last of the European Enlightenment tradition than the first of American historical epics.

Historian Peter C. Messer in 2002 examined the transition in Ramsay's republican perspective from his History of the American Revolution (1789) to his more conservative History of the United States (1816–17). His works went from a call for active citizens to reform and improve societal institutions to a warning of the dangers of an overzealous population and the need to preserve existing institutions. In his discussion of the treatment of Native Americans and African American slaves, he became less critical of whites and changed to reflect the views of society at large. Ramsay's increasing involvement in South Carolina's economic and political institutions and the need for stability that defined early 19th century nationalism influenced this transition.

== Assassination ==
Ramsay was appointed by a court to examine William Linnen, a tailor known for serial litigation and nuisance suits, after Linnen had attempted to murder his attorney. Ramsay reported to the court that Linnen was "deranged" and that it would be "dangerous to let him go at large." After apparently regaining his sanity, Linnen was released; though he threatened Ramsay, the latter did not take the threat seriously.

On May 6, 1815, at 1 p.m., Ramsay passed Linnen on Broad Street in Charleston. Linnen took out a "horseman's pistol" that he had concealed in a handkerchief, and shot Ramsay twice, in the back and hip. According to a contemporary source:

Having been carried home, and being surrounded by a crowd of anxious citizens, after first calling their attention to what he was about to utter, he said "I know not if these wounds be mortal; I am not afraid to die; but should that be my fate, I call on all here present to bear witness, that I consider the unfortunate perpetrator of this deed a lunatic, and free from guilt."

Ramsay died at 7 a.m. on May 8, 1815. He was buried at the Circular Congregational Church in Charleston.

== See also ==
- List of assassinated American politicians

== Selected works in medicine and science ==
- Ramsay, David, The Charleston Medical Register for the Year MDCCCII, 1803.
- Ramsay, David, A Dissertation on the Means of Preserving Health, in Charleston, and the Adjacent Low Country, 1790.
- Ramsay, David, An Eulogium upon Benjamin Rush, M.D., 1813.
- Ramsay, David, A Review of the Improvements, Progress and State of Medicine in the XVIIIth Century, 1801.
- Ramsay, David, A Sketch of the Soil, Climate, Weather, and Diseases of South-Carolina, 1796.

== Bibliography ==
- Hostetler, Michael J. "David Ramsay and Louisiana: Time and Space in the Adolescent Rhetoric of America." Western Journal of Communication 70 (2) (April 2006): 134–146.
- Kornfeld, Eve. "From Republicanism to Liberalism: The Intellectual Journey of David Ramsay." Journal of the Early Republic 1989 9(1): 289–313.
- Messer, Peter C. "From a Revolutionary History to a History of Revolution: David Ramsay and the American Revolution." : Journal of the Early Republic 2002 22(2): 205–233. Jstor
- O'Brien, Karen. "David Ramsay and the Delayed Americanization of American History." Early American Literature 1994 29(1): 1-18. ISSN 0012-8163 Fulltext: in Ebsco
- Shaffer, Arthur. To Be an American: David Ramsay and the Making of the American Consciousness. (University of South Carolina Press, 1991).

U.S. House of Representatives
New seat	Member of the Continental Congress from South Carolina; 1785–1786	Seat abolished
