= Washington's aides-de-camp =

American Revolutionary war officers for General Washington

Washington's aides-de-camp during the American Revolutionary War were officers of the Continental Army appointed to serve on General George Washington's headquarters staff, with the rank of lieutenant colonel. The headquarters staff also included one military secretary, a full colonel.

Washington had a small number of aides-de-camp at any given time, with relatively frequent turnover. A total of 32 men were appointed to these positions, and served between July 4, 1775, and December 23, 1783. Other people worked as volunteer aides or assistants, and helped with office duties when needed.

== Headquarters staff ==
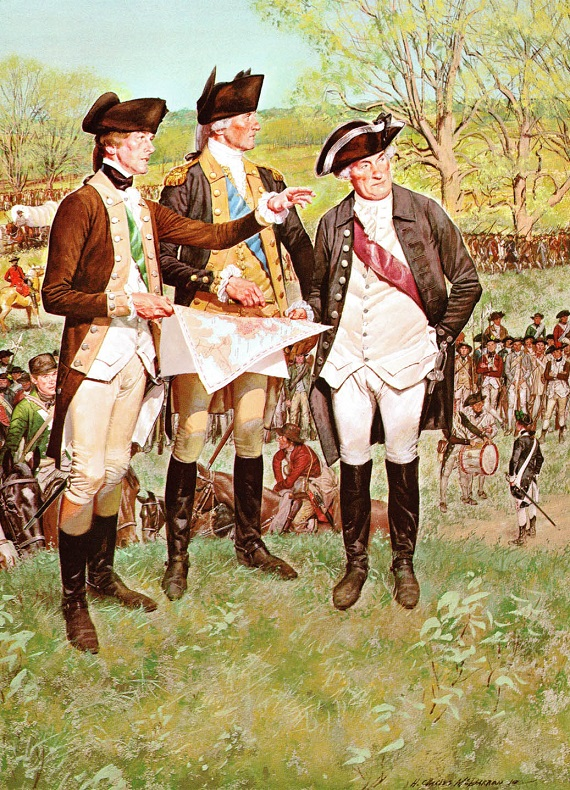
The American Soldier – 1775, an aide-de-camp of General George Washington and General Artemas Ward at the Siege of Boston

The Second Continental Congress unanimously elected George Washington to the position of Commander-in-Chief of the Continental Army on June 15, 1775. He traveled to Cambridge, Massachusetts, and took command of the siege of Boston on July 3. His headquarters staff initially consisted of his military secretary, Joseph Reed, and one aide-de-camp, Thomas Mifflin.

The responsibilities of the headquarters staff included managing Washington's military correspondence, making copies of each day's General Orders (to be distributed to the commanding officer at each military post), and making copies of individual orders. The 19-year-old artist John Trumbull, who was skilled at drawing maps, was appointed an aide-de-camp on July 27, and served three weeks before being transferred.

The Second Continental Congress in Philadelphia authorized one military secretary and three aides-de-camp for the commander-in-chief, but this number soon proved insufficient. Washington's pleas for Congress to authorize two additional aides were ignored, so he augmented his staff with volunteers. Six aides-de-camp, George Baylor, Edmund Randolph, Robert Hanson Harrison, George Lewis, Stephen Moylan, William Palfrey, were appointed by Washington between August 1775 and March 1776, some replacing predecessors who had been transferred. Finally, in January 1778, Congress granted the commander-in-chief the power to appoint headquarters staff as he saw fit.

The military secretary held the rank of colonel in the Continental Army, with a monthly pay of $66 in 1775 (equivalent to about $2,050 in 2018). The aides-de-camp held the rank of lieutenant colonel, with a monthly pay of $33 in 1775 (equivalent to about $1,025 in 2018). The aides-de-camp wore a green riband across their chests as a rank insignia. Washington referred to the headquarters staff as "my family." Some were the sons of his friends and relatives, but above all he valued talent:

The Secretaries and Aid De Camps to the Commander in chief ought not to be confined to the line for plain and obvious reasons. The number which the nature and extent of his business require, in addition to the many drawn from the line to fill the different offices of the staff, when it is considered, that they ought all to be men of abilities, may seem too large a draft upon the line. But a consideration still more forcible is, that in a service so complex as ours, it would be wrong and detrimental to restrict the choice; the vast diversity of objects, occurrences and correspondencies, unknown in one more regular and less diffusive; constantly calling for talents and abilities of the first rate, men who possess them, ought to be taken, wherever they can be found.

On the battlefield, the aides-de-camp were couriers, delivering Washington's orders on horseback and gathering or relaying intelligence on enemy troop movement. Samuel Blachley Webb was wounded at the October 28, 1776, Battle of White Plains and at the December 26, 1776, Battle of Trenton. John Fitzgerald and John Laurens were both wounded at the June 28, 1778, Battle of Monmouth, where Alexander Hamilton's horse was shot from under him. George Johnston served barely four months, before dying of disease at the Morristown headquarters. Tench Tilghman served longer than any other aide-de-camp: more than seven years, about half of it as a volunteer.

The commander-in-chief's headquarters staff was disbanded on December 23, 1783, when General Washington resigned his commission to the Second Continental Congress, which was then meeting at Annapolis, Maryland. Aides David Humphreys, David Cobb, and Benjamin Walker escorted him to and from the ceremony. Many members of Washington's headquarters staff earned his trust and friendship and some later served in his presidential administration.

=== Additional aides ===
In 1906, Worthington Chauncey Ford, chief of the Manuscripts Division at the Library of Congress, published a list of Washington's 32 military secretaries and aides-de-camp. He added Martha Washington as number 33, acknowledging her unofficial clerical help at Washington's headquarters.

Frank E. Grizzard, Jr., former editor of The Papers of George Washington: Revolutionary War Series, adds to the list Washington's nephew, George Augustine Washington—a volunteer aide from September 1779 to May 1781, and from December 1781 to May 1782.

== Military secretaries ==
- Joseph Reed (1741–1785) – Served as Gen. Washington's military secretary from June 19 to October 30, 1775. He took leave to prepare a case before the Pennsylvania Supreme Court. Reed rejoined the Continental Army on June 16, 1776, as Adjutant General.
- Stephen Moylan (1737–1811) – Served as Muster Master General from August 14 to November 1775; and as Gen. Washington's acting-military secretary (in Joseph Reed's absence) from November 1775 to May 1776. He served as a Washington aide-de-camp from March 6 to June 5, 1776, and as a volunteer aide from September 28, 1776, to January 1777.
- Robert Hanson Harrison (1745–1790) – Served as Gen. Washington's military secretary from May 16, 1776 to March 25, 1781. He had served as a Washington aide-de-camp from November 1775 to May 1776.
- Jonathan Trumbull, Jr. (1740–1809) – Served as Gen. Washington's military secretary from June 8, 1781 to December 23, 1783.

== Appointed aides-de-camp ==
- Hodijah Baylies (1756–1842) – Served as an aide-de-camp to Gen. Washington from May 14, 1782 to December 23, 1783. He had graduated Harvard in 1777, was commissioned a lieutenant in Jackson's Additional Continental Regiment, appointed as aide-de-camp to General Benjamin Lincoln, and was promoted to major. He was captured by the British at the siege of Charleston. Exchanged in November 1780, he returned to Harvard for a master of arts degree.
- George Baylor (1752–1784) – Served as an aide-de-camp to Gen. Washington from August 15, 1775 to January 1, 1777.
- Richard Cary (c.1746–1806) – Served as an aide-de-camp to Gen. Washington from June 21 to December 1776. He was written about kindly by Congressman John Adams to another Massachusetts delegate, William Tudor, judge advocate to the Continental Army, and was appointed a brigade major. Cary resigned to get married.
- Dr. David Cobb (1748–1830)– Served as an aide-de-camp to Gen. Washington from June 15, 1781 to January 1783, and from June to December 23, 1783.
- Col. John Fitzgerald (d. 1799) – Served as an aide-de-camp to Gen. Washington from November 1776 to July 1778. Wounded at the June 28, 1778 Battle of Monmouth, he retired from the Continental Army.
- Peregrine Fitzhugh (1759–1811) – Served as an aide-de-camp to Gen. Washington from July 2 to October 1781.
- Capt. Caleb Gibbs (1748–1818) – Commander of Washington's life-guard, he managed the headquarters household accounts from May 16, 1776, to the end of 1780, and served as a supplemental aide-de-camp.
- Col. William Grayson (1740–1790) – Served as Gen. Washington's assistant secretary from July to August 1776, and served as an aide-de-camp to Gen. Washington from August 24, 1776 to January 11, 1777.
- Alexander Hamilton (1757–1804) – Served as an aide-de-camp to Gen. Washington from March 1, 1777 to April 1781.
- Alexander Contee Hanson (1749–1806) – Served as Gen. Washington's assistant secretary from June 21 to September 1776.
- Robert Hanson Harrison (1745–1790) – Served as an aide-de-camp to Gen. Washington from November 6, 1775 to May 16, 1776, and as Gen. Washington's military secretary from May 16, 1776 to March 25, 1781.
- David Humphreys (1752–1818) – Served as an aide-de-camp to Gen. Washington from June 23, 1780 to December 23, 1783. After the war, he was private secretary to Washington at Mount Vernon, and secretary to President Washington in New York City, 1789–90.
- George Johnston, Jr. (1750–1777) – Major in the 5th Virginia Regiment; appointed an aide-de-camp to Gen. Washington on January 20, 1777; died of disease at Morristown, New Jersey, May 29, 1777.
- John Laurens (1754–1782) – Served as volunteer aide from August 9 to September 6, 1777, when he was appointed an extra aide-de-camp. He was officially appointed aide-de-camp to Gen. Washington on October 6, 1777, and held that position until March 29, 1779, when Congress commissioned him to travel home to South Carolina and attempt to recruit a regiment of slaves. On behalf of the United States, Laurens traveled to Europe and negotiated a 10 million-livre loan from the Netherlands, to be guaranteed by France. He returned to the United States in September 1781, rejoined General Washington at the siege of Yorktown, and helped to negotiate the surrender of British General Cornwallis. He returned to South Carolina in November 1781, and died nine months later in the Battle of the Combahee River.
- George Lewis (1757–1821) – Gen. Washington's nephew. A volunteer aide from November 1775 to December 1776. Appointed a lieutenant in the commander-in-chief's life guards in May 1776, he transferred to the 2nd Continental Dragoons in December 1776.
- Dr. James McHenry (1753–1816) – Served as an aide-de-camp to Gen. Washington from May 15, 1778, to August 1780. An Irish-born Philadelphia medical student, he served as a surgeon early in the war. Left to join the staff of the Marquis de Lafayette.
- Richard Kidder Meade (1746–1805) – Served as an aide-de-camp to Gen. Washington from March 12, 1777, to November 1780; supervised the October 2, 1780 execution of British Major John André.
- Thomas Mifflin (1744–1800) – Served as an aide-de-camp to Gen. Washington from June 19 to August 14, 1775, when he was promoted to Quartermaster General.
- Stephen Moylan (1737–1811) – Served as an aide-de-camp to Gen. Washington from March 6, 1776, to June 5, 1776, and as a volunteer aide from September 28, 1776, to January 1777.
- William Palfrey (1741–1780) – Served as an aide-de-camp to Gen. Washington from March 6 to April 1776.
- Pierre Penet (d. 1812) – A French merchant who had supplied arms and materiel, 1775–76. On Washington's recommendation, Congress confirmed him as a brevet aide-de-camp (October 14, 1776). Penet served from October 1776 to January 1783.
- Edmund Randolph (1753–1813) – Served as an aide-de-camp to Gen. Washington from August 15 to November 2, 1775.
- Col. William Stephens Smith (1755–1816) – Served as an aide-de-camp to Gen. Washington from July 6, 1781, to June 1782.
- Peter Presley Thornton (1750–1780) – A volunteer aide, August–September 1777; served as an extra aide-de-camp to Gen. Washington from September 6, 1777 to [unknown].
- Tench Tilghman (1744–1786) – A Maryland militiaman who spoke fluent French, he served as an aide-de-camp to Gen. Washington for more than 7 years (longer than anyone else). A volunteer aide from August 8, 1776, to June 21, 1780, Washington confirmed his special status in General Orders. He was appointed an aide-de-camp to Gen. Washington on June 21, 1780 and served until November 1783. On June 5, 1781, at Washington's request, Congress awarded Tilghman the rank of Lieutenant Colonel, dating his military commission retroactively to April 1, 1777.
- John Trumbull (1756–1843) – Served as an aide-de-camp to Gen. Washington from July 27 to August 15, 1775.
- Richard Varick (1753–1831) – Served as Gen. Washington's aide-de-camp and private secretary from May 25, 1781, to mid-December 1783. Hired after Congress approved Washington's request to have a team specifically designed to organize and catalogue and compose all of his correspondence, Varick was personally hired by Washington to lead that team. He would go on to serve at Mayor of New York City for eleven years.
- Benjamin Walker (1753–1818) – Served as an aide-de-camp to Gen. Washington from January 25, 1782, to December 23, 1783.
- John Walker (1744–1809) – Served as a Washington aide-de-camp, February 19 to March 1777.
- Samuel Blachley Webb (1753–1807) – Served as an aide-de-camp to Gen. Israel Putnam, and was wounded at Bunker Hill. Served as an aide-de-camp to Gen. Washington from June 21, 1776 to January 11, 1777, during which he was wounded at White Plains, and Trenton. On January 11, 1777, Washington appointed him commander of a new Connecticut regiment, Webb's Additional Continental Regiment. In December 1777, Webb was captured by the British and held prisoner for three years.

=== Volunteer aides ===
- George Augustine Washington (1759–1793) – Gen. Washington's nephew. A volunteer aide from September 1779 to May 1781, and from December 1781 to May 1782. Estate manager at Mount Vernon, 1780s-1793.
- John Parke Custis (1754–1781) – Gen. Washington's step-son. A volunteer aide from October to November 1781, including during the siege of Yorktown. Died of camp fever, November 5, 1781.
- Joseph Brearley (1742-1805) - Brother of well known David Brearley. After serving the Second New Jersey Regiment of the Continental Line as a captain at the Battle of the Cedars, he was promoted to major in 1777 and served as volunteer aide to Gen. Washington until the end of the war.

=== Possible aides ===
- Peter Bowman (1761–1835) – "Among the graves of distinguished Revolutionary War soldiers in Onondaga County [New York] is that of Peter Bowman, an aide of Gen. George Washington, who is buried in Belle Isle Cemetery."
- John Hopwood (1745–1802) – Family tradition holds that Hopwood was an aide to Gen. Washington.
- Ebenezer Mann – "Dr. Ebenezer Mann was a Brigade Surgeon at the Battle of Monmouth and Yorktown."
- Albert Pawling (1750–1837) – A family history claims he was an aide-de-camp to Gen. Washington. Major Albert Pawling was an officer in Malcolm's Additional Continental Regiment, and tendered his resignation on February 25, 1779. Washington tried to persuade him to reconsider, but was unsuccessful.
- Mathias Swartzel (1739 - 1820) identified as "Adj. to General Washington" on his grave marker.
- Timothy Chase (1760–1832) – "Identified as "aid to General Washington" in THE MINUTE MAN - Official Bulletin of the National Society of the Sons of the American Revolution."

== See also ==
- Bibliography of Alexander Hamilton
- Bibliography of George Washington
