= Portrait of Henry Laurens =

Painting by John Singleton Copley

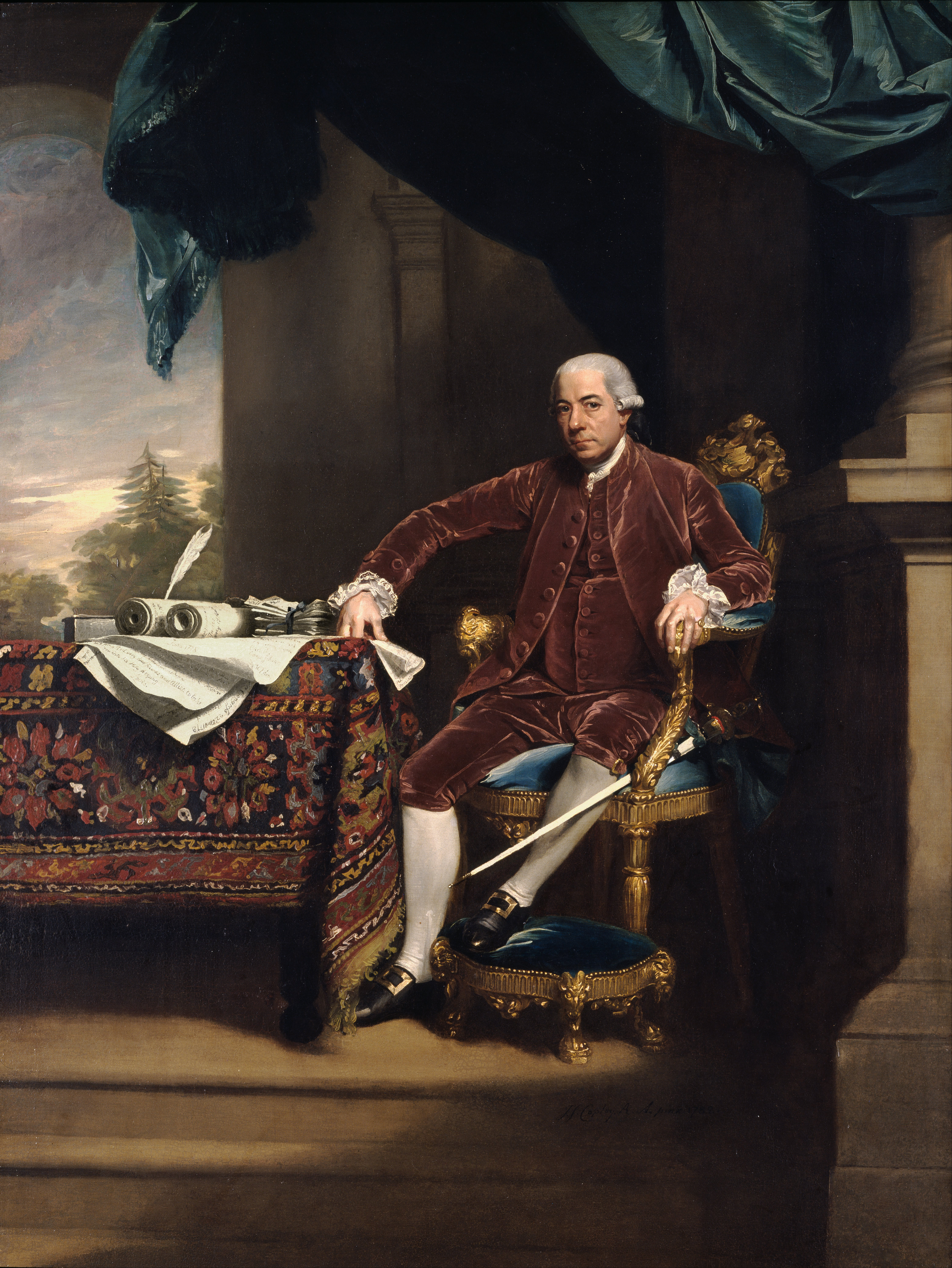
- Artist: John Singleton Copley
- Year: 1782
- Type: Oil on canvas, portrait painting
- Dimensions: 137.5 cm × 103 cm (54.1 in × 41 in)
- Location: National Portrait Gallery; Washington D.C.

Portrait of Henry Laurens is a 1782 portrait painting by the Anglo-American artist John Singleton Copley. It depicts the American merchant, diplomat, and Founding Father Henry Laurens.

Laurens, as president of the Second Continental Congress, signed the Articles of Confederation in 1777, and in 1783 helped negotiate the Treaty of Paris which ended the American Revolutionary War. From a slaveowning South Carolina family and one of the partners of the largest slave-trading companies in the Thirteen Colonies, Laurens objected to the British Army's offer of freedom to renegade slaves. Having been sent as envoy to the Dutch Republic, he was captured in his return journey by the Royal Navy and imprisoned in the Tower of London. He spent fifteen months in custody. Copley, a Boston-born artist who has emigrated to Britain in 1774, painted Laurens on his release.

== Bibliography ==
- Edelson, Max S. Plantation Enterprise in Colonial South Carolina. Harvard University Press, 2011.
- Kamensky, Jane. A Revolution in Color: The World of John Singleton Copley. W. W. Norton & Company, 2016..
- Prown, Jules David. John Singleton Copley: In England, 1774-1815. National Gallery of Art, Washington, 1966.
