= Mordecai Gist =

American general (1743–1792)

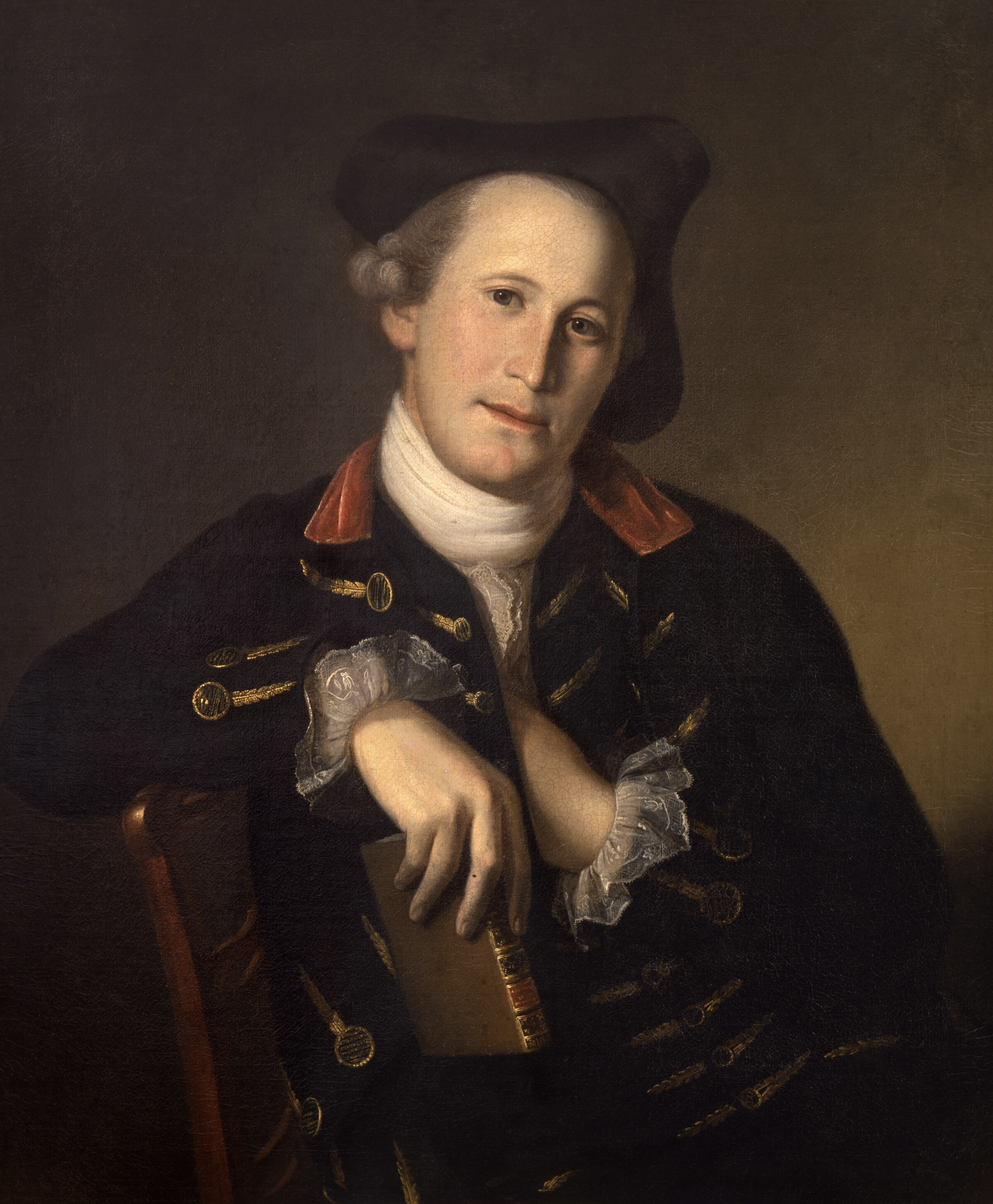
- Portrait by Charles Willson Peale, c. 1774
- Born: 1743; Maryland, British America
- Died: 1792 (aged 48–49); South Carolina, U.S.
- Military career
- Allegiance: United States
- Branch: Continental Army
- Rank: Brigadier general
- Commands: 2nd Maryland Brigade
- Conflicts: American Revolutionary War; Battle of Long Island; Battle of Camden; Siege of Yorktown; Battle of the Combahee River

Mordecai Gist (1743–1792) was a member of a prominent Maryland family who became a brigadier general in command of the Maryland Line in the Continental Army during the American Revolutionary War.

== Life ==
Gist was born February 22, 1742/3 in Baltimore, Maryland (one source says Reisterstown, Maryland), the fourth child of Thomas and Susannah (Cockey) Gist. Thomas Gist's father, Captain Richard Gist (1684 – August 28, 1741), was the surveyor of Maryland's Eastern Shore and one of the commissioners who laid out Baltimore Town in 1729.

Mordecai Gist was educated for commercial pursuits. At the beginning of the American Revolution, the young men of Baltimore associated under the title of the "Baltimore Independent Company" and elected Gist as their captain. It was the first company raised in Maryland for the defense of popular liberty.

== Revolutionary War service ==
In 1776, Gist was appointed major of Smallwood's Maryland Regiment, and was with them in the Battle of Long Island, where they fought a delaying action at the Old Stone House (Brooklyn, New York), allowing the American army to escape encirclement.

In January 1779, the Continental Congress appointed him as a brigadier general in the Continental Army, and he took the command of the 2nd Maryland Brigade. He fought stubbornly at the Battle of Camden in South Carolina in 1780. At one time after a bayonet charge, his force secured fifty prisoners, but the British under Lord Cornwallis rallied, and the Marylanders gave way. Gist escaped, and, a year later, he was present at the surrender of Cornwallis at Yorktown. (Gist appears (back row, right side) in John Trumbull's painting Surrender of Lord Cornwallis which hangs in the rotunda of the United States Capitol in Washington, D.C.)

He joined the southern army under Nathanael Greene, and he was given the command of the light corps again when the army was remodeled in 1782. On August 26, 1782, he rallied the broken forces of the Americans under John Laurens after they had been scattered in an ambush set by a British foraging party.

== After the war ==
After the war, Gist relocated to a plantation near Charleston, South Carolina. He was admitted as an original member of The Society of the Cincinnati of Maryland and was elected as the first vice president of the Maryland Society on November 22, 1783. He later transferred his membership to the South Carolina Society. Gist also served as the grand master of Freemasons in South Carolina.

He had two children that lived to adulthood, both sons, one of whom he named "Independent" and the other "States." Various sources suggest he died between August and September 1792, at the age of 49, in Charleston, but his will was written on the "First day of September" and probated the following month on October 19, 1792. He is buried in St. Michael's Churchyard next to his son, States Gist, and daughter Susannah Gist.

Mordecai Gist was distantly related to States Rights Gist, a brigadier general in the Confederate army during the American Civil War who died of wounds received while leading his brigade in a charge against U.S. fortifications at the Battle of Franklin in November 1864. States Rights Gist was the grandson of William Gist (born 1711), cousin of Mordecai Gist.

His papers are held at the Maryland Historical Society.
