= Nathaniel Ramsey =

American soldier and lawyer (1741–1817)

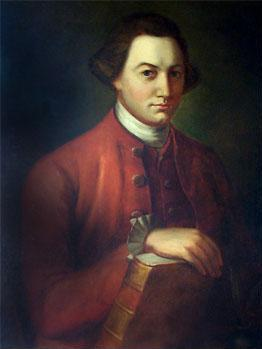
Nathaniel Ramsey, Continental Army officer

Nathaniel Ramsey (May 1, 1741– October 23, 1817) was an American lawyer and soldier from Cecil County, Maryland. Ramsey fought in the Revolutionary War, and was a member of the Congress of the Confederation.

== Life ==
Ramsey was born in Lancaster County, Pennsylvania. He was the elder brother of David Ramsay, though the brothers spelled their name differently. He graduated from the College of New Jersey (later Princeton University) in 1767 and then read law. He settled in northeastern Maryland, and was admitted to the bar in Cecil County in 1771. Ramsey was married to Margaret Jane Peale, known to her family as Jenny, about 1771. Margaret Jane Peale Ramsey often followed the Continental Army following the Battle of Brooklyn.

Margaret died in 1788. Ramsey remarried in 1790 to Charlotte Hall, daughter of Colonel Aquilla Hall (1727-1779), a prominent citizen of Harford County, Maryland.

He was the brother-in-law of artist Charles Willson Peale, who is best remembered for his portrait paintings of leading figures of the American Revolution and for establishing the Philadelphia Museum, one of the first museums in the United States.

== Revolutionary War service ==
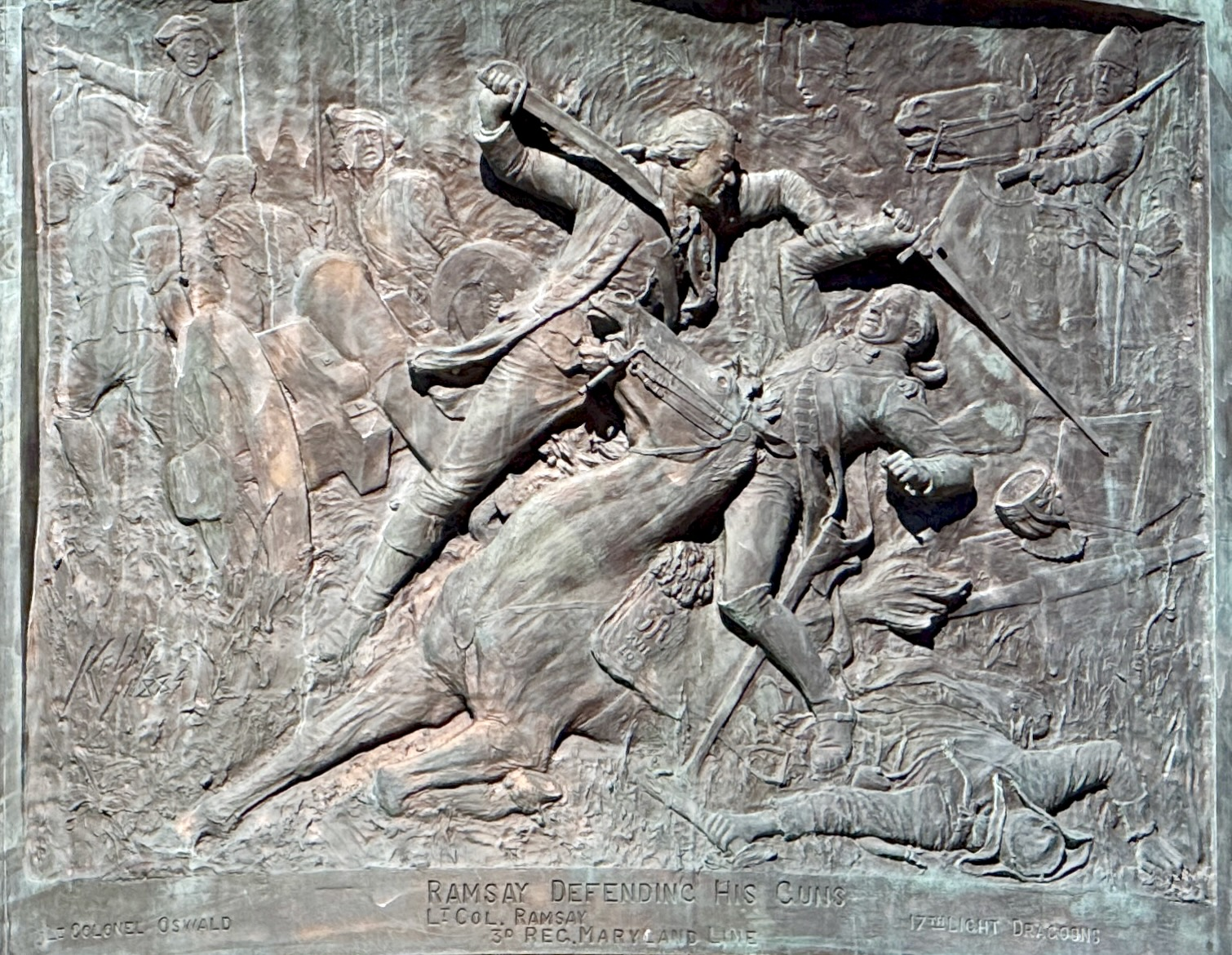
Ramsay Defending His Guns bas-relief on the Monmouth Battle Monument

Ramsey was a delegate to the Maryland Convention (the revolutionary assembly) in 1775. In 1776 he joined the Continental Army as a captain in Colonel Smallwood's 1st Maryland Regiment, and went north in time to see action in the Battle of Long Island in August. In December he was promoted to lieutenant colonel and placed in command of the 3rd Maryland Regiment. He led them in the defense of Philadelphia in 1777.

At the Battle of Monmouth, on June 28, 1778, Ramsey was asked by General Washington to stop the British advance after General Lee's initial retreat, and gain time for Washington to rally his other troops. He did so, but his regiment took heavy casualties. Ramsey himself was seriously wounded, left for dead, and taken prisoner. By the time he was exchanged, his regiment had gone south with General Nathanael Greene's forces. He returned to Maryland, and his only remaining military role was in recruiting. He retired from the army on January 1, 1781, and resumed the practice of law in Cecil County. At the conclusion of the Revolutionary War, Ramsey was admitted as an original member of The Society of the Cincinnati of Maryland and served as the first Treasurer of the Maryland Society.

== After the war ==
Ramsey moved to Baltimore, Maryland in 1783, and practiced law there. He represented Maryland in the Congress of the Confederation in New York in 1786 and 1787. He was a Federalist, and after the establishment of the Federal government in 1789, President Washington appointed him the first U.S. Marshal for the District of Maryland, with his offices in Baltimore. He held this post from 1790 to 1798. In addition, he was named as Port Captain for Baltimore, serving from 1794 until his death in 1817. He died in Baltimore and is buried in Westminster Hall and Burying Ground.
