= John Laurens =

American soldier and abolitionist (1754–1782)

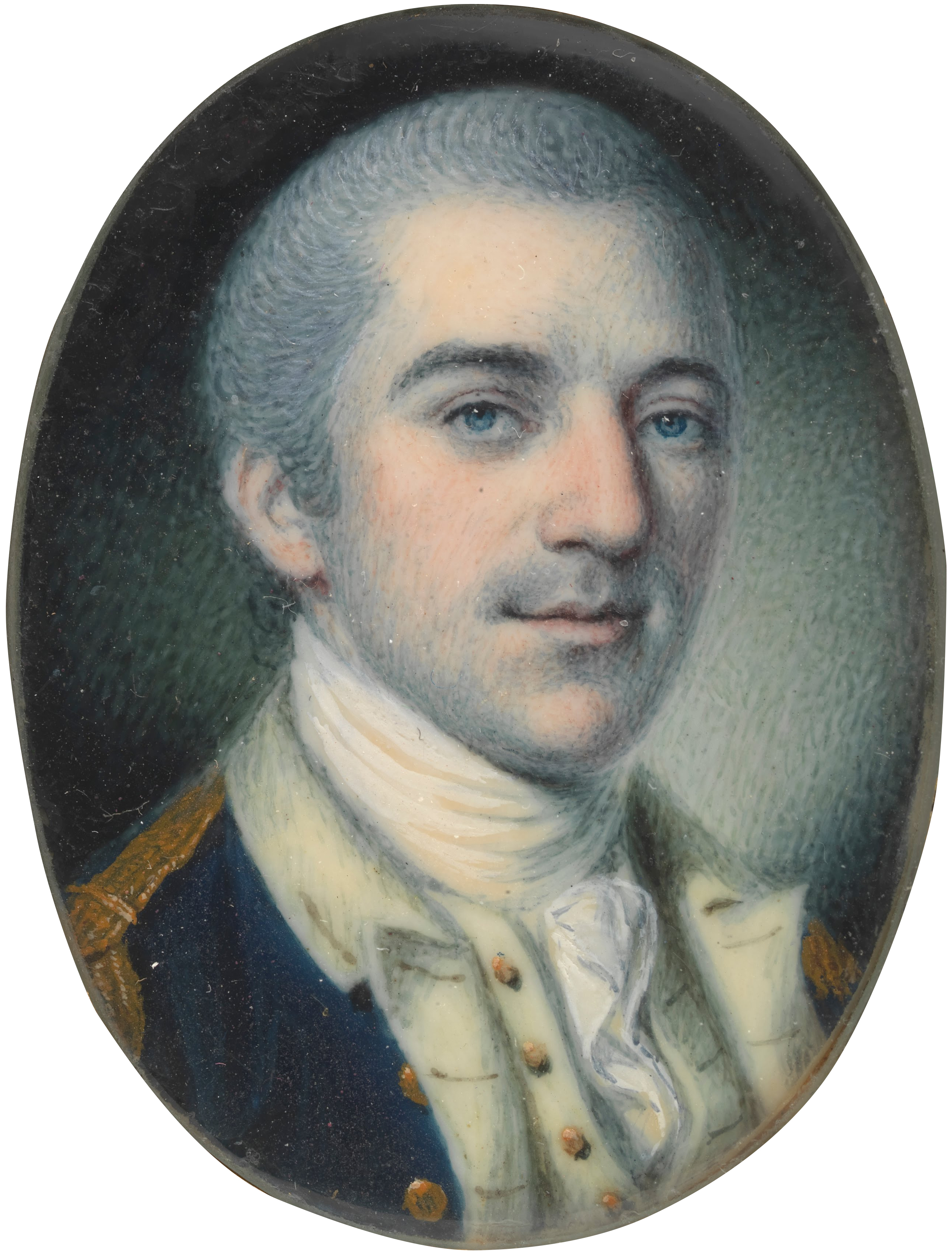
- Portrait miniature by Charles Willson Peale, 1780
- Born: October 28, 1754; Charlestown, South Carolina, British America (now Charleston, South Carolina, U.S.)
- Died: August 27, 1782 (aged 27); Combahee River, near Beaufort, South Carolina, U.S.
- Burial place: Laurens Family Cemetery, Mepkin Abbey; Moncks Corner, South Carolina, U.S.
- Spouse: Martha Manning (m. 1776)
- Children: 1
- Relatives: Henry Laurens (father); Eleanor Delamere Ball Laurens (mother); Martha Laurens Ramsay (sister)
- Military career
- Allegiance: United States of America
- Branch: Continental Army
- Service years: 1777–1782
- Rank: Lieutenant colonel
- Conflicts: American Revolutionary War; Battle of Brandywine (WIA); Battle of Germantown (WIA); Battle of Monmouth (WIA); Battle of Coosawhatchie (WIA); Siege of Savannah; Siege of Yorktown; Battle of the Combahee River †

Signature
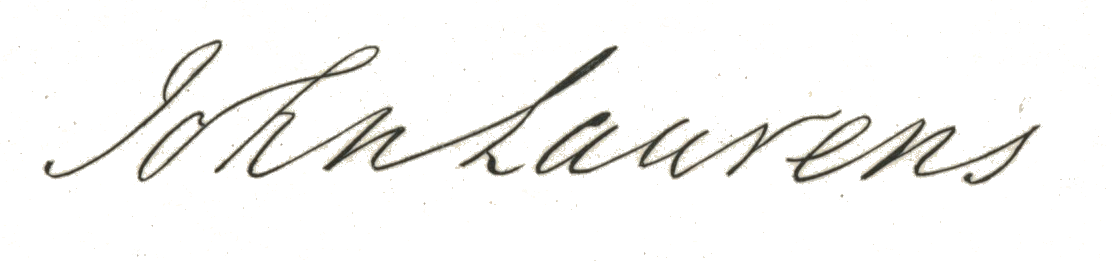

John Laurens (October 28, 1754 – August 27, 1782) was an American soldier and statesman from South Carolina during the American Revolutionary War, best known for his efforts to help recruit slaves to fight for their freedom as U.S. soldiers.

In 1779, Laurens gained approval from the Continental Congress for his plan to recruit a brigade of 3,000 slaves by promising them freedom in return for fighting. The plan was defeated by political opposition in South Carolina. Laurens was killed in the Battle of the Combahee River in August 1782.

== Early life and education ==
John Laurens was born in Charleston, South Carolina, on October 28, 1754, to Henry Laurens and Eleanor Ball Laurens, both of whose families were prosperous as planters cultivating rice. He had French heritage and spoke the language fluently.

John was the eldest of the five children who survived infancy. John and his two younger brothers, Henry Jr. and James, were tutored at home, but after the death of their mother, their father took them to England for their education. His two sisters, Martha and Mary Eleanor, remained with their paternal uncle James in Charleston.

By the 1750s, the elder Laurens and his business partner George Austin had become wealthy as owners of one of the largest slave trading houses in North America.

In May 1770, Laurens's mother died a month after giving birth to his last sibling, Mary Eleanor Laurens, who was one of the five to survive to maturity.

In October 1771, Laurens's father moved with his sons to London, and Laurens was educated in Europe from the ages of 16 to 22. For two years beginning in June 1772, he and one brother attended school in Geneva, Switzerland, where they lived with a family friend.

As a youth, Laurens had expressed considerable interest in science and medicine, and later in life, he would be elected a member of the American Philosophical Society. However, upon returning to London in August 1774, he yielded to his father's wish that he study law. In November 1774, Laurens began his legal studies at the Middle Temple. Laurens's father returned to Charleston, leaving Laurens as guardian to his brothers, both enrolled in British schools.

== Military and diplomatic career ==
=== Service as Washington's aide-de-camp ===
Laurens arrived at Charleston in April 1777. That summer he accompanied his father from Charleston to Philadelphia, where his father was to serve in the Continental Congress. Henry Laurens, finding himself unable to prevent his son from joining the Continental Army, was able to obtain a position of honor for his 23-year-old son.

General George Washington invited Laurens to join his staff in early August, as a volunteer aide-de-camp. Washington wrote:

I mean to delay the actual Appointment of my fourth Aide de Camp a while longer; but if you will do me the honour to become a member of my Family, you will make me very happy, by your Company and assistance in that Line as an Extra Aid and I shall be glad to receive you in that capacity whenever it is convenient to you.

Laurens became close friends with two of his fellow aides-de-camp, Alexander Hamilton and the Marquis de Lafayette. He quickly became known for his reckless courage upon first seeing combat on September 11, 1777, at the Battle of Brandywine during the Philadelphia campaign. Lafayette observed, "It was not his fault that he was not killed or wounded [at Brandywine,] he did everything that was necessary to procure one or t'other." Laurens behaved with similar recklessness at the Battle of Germantown, in which he was wounded on October 4, 1777:

Washington's forces surprise-attacked the British north of Philadelphia. At one point, the Americans were stymied by a large stone mansion occupied by the enemy. After several attempts to take the building failed, Laurens and a French volunteer, the chevalier Duplessis-Mauduit, came up with their own daring plan. They gathered some straw to set on fire and place at the front door of the house. According to another officer's account of Laurens's actions that day, "He rushed up to the door of Chew's House, which he forced partly open, and fighting with his sword with one hand, with the other he applied the wood work a flaming brand, and what is very remarkable, retired from under the tremendous fire of the house, with but a very slight wound." Laurens was struck by a musket ball that went through part of his right shoulder, and he made a sling for his arm from his uniform sash.

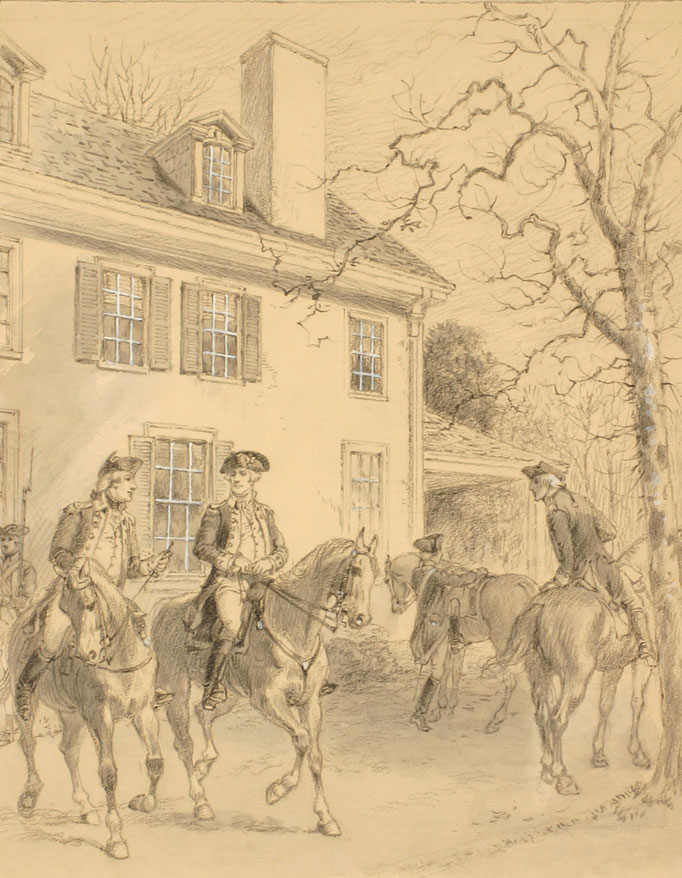
Headquarters at Emlen House in late 1777

Two days after the Battle of Germantown, on October 6, 1777, he was given his official appointment as one of General Washington's aides-de-camp, and was commissioned with the rank of lieutenant colonel. From November 2 to December 11, 1777, Washington and several aides, including Laurens, were quartered at the Emlen House, north of Philadelphia in Camp Hill, which served as Washington's headquarters through the Battle of White Marsh.

After spending the remainder of the winter of 1777–1778 encamped at Valley Forge, Laurens marched to New Jersey around June 1778, to fight in the Battle of Monmouth. Near the start of battle, Laurens had his horse shot out from under him while he did reconnaissance for Baron von Steuben.

On December 23, 1778, Laurens engaged in a duel with General Charles Lee just outside Philadelphia, after Laurens took offense to Lee's slander of Washington's character. Lee was wounded in the side by Laurens's first shot, and Laurens, believing the wound was more serious than it seemed, went to help the general. However, Lee said it was fine and proposed to shoot a second time. The men's seconds, Alexander Hamilton and Evan Edwards, opposed this idea and had the duel end there, despite Lee's protests to fire again and Laurens's agreement.

=== Anti-slavery statements and recruitment of black soldiers ===
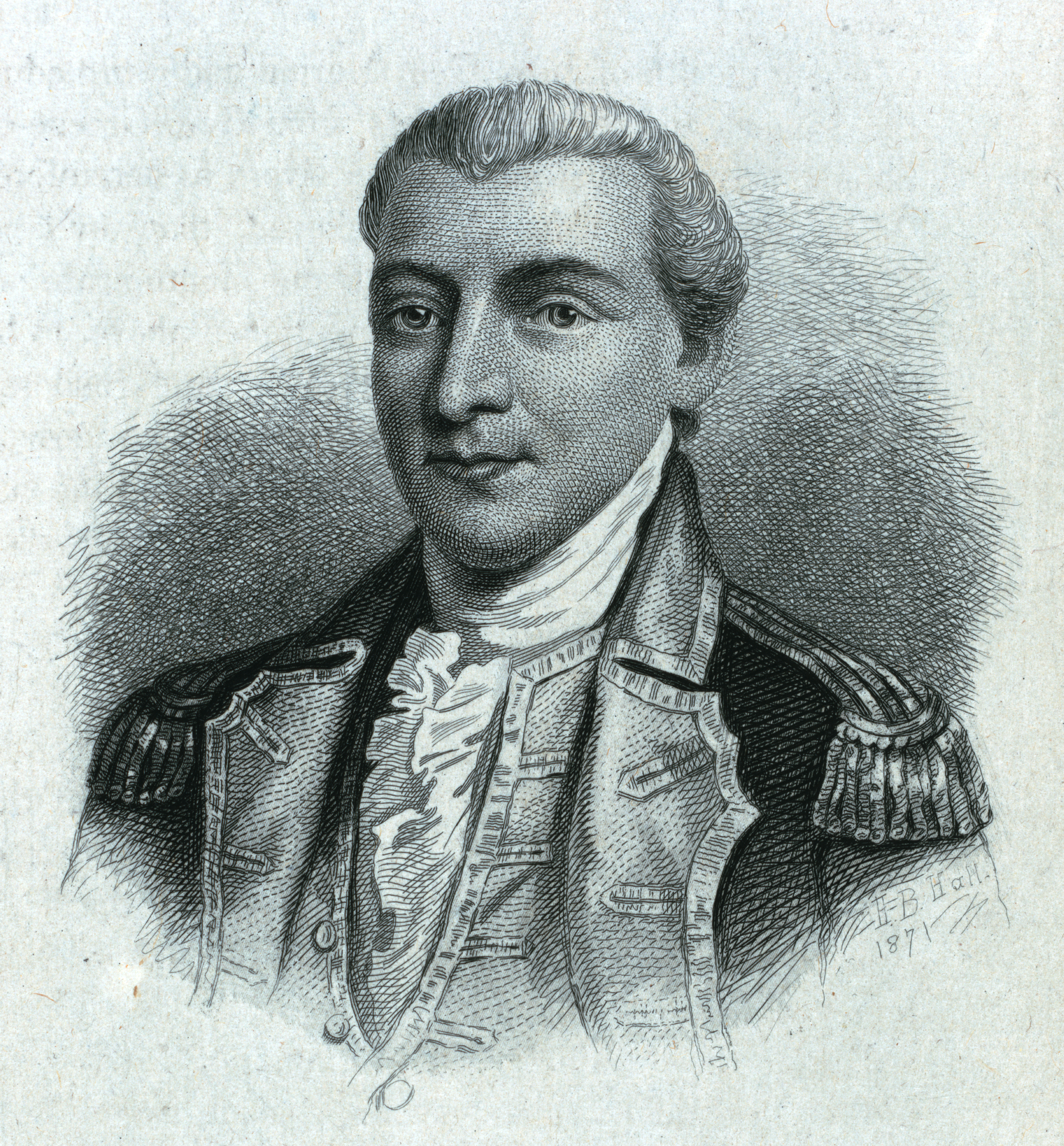
Lt. Col. John Laurens, 1871 engraving by H. B. Hall

As the British stepped up operations in the South, Laurens promoted the idea of arming slaves and granting them freedom in return for their service. He had written, "We Americans at least in the Southern Colonies, cannot contend with a good Grace, for Liberty, until we shall have enfranchised our Slaves." Laurens was set apart from other leaders in Revolutionary-era South Carolina by his belief that black and white people shared a similar nature and could aspire to freedom in a republican society.

In early 1778, Laurens advised his father, who was then the President of the Continental Congress, to use forty slaves he stood to inherit as part of a brigade. Henry Laurens granted the request, but with reservations that caused postponement of the project.

Congress approved the concept of a regiment of slaves in March 1779, and sent Laurens south to recruit a regiment of 3,000 black soldiers; however, the plan was opposed, and Laurens was ultimately unsuccessful. Having won election to the South Carolina House of Representatives, Laurens introduced his black regiment plan in 1779, again in 1780, and a third time in 1782, meeting overwhelming rejection each time. Governor John Rutledge and General Christopher Gadsden were among the opponents.

=== Battles in South Carolina ===
In 1779, when the British threatened Charleston, Governor Rutledge proposed to surrender the city with the condition that Carolina become neutral in the war. Laurens strongly opposed the idea and fought with Continental forces to repel the British.

==== Battle of Coosawhatchie ====
On May 3, 1779, Colonel William Moultrie's troops, outnumbered two to one, faced 2,400 British regulars under General Augustine Prevost, who had crossed the Savannah River. At a point about two miles east of the Coosawhatchie River, Moultrie had left 100 men to guard a river crossing and provide warning when the British arrived.

As the enemy drew near, Moultrie was about to send an aide to pull these troops back to the main force when Col. John Laurens offered to lead them back. Moultrie had so much confidence in the officer that he sent along 250 men to help cover the flanks. In direct disobedience of orders, Laurens crossed the river and formed the men in line for battle. He failed to take the high ground and his men suffered greatly from well-placed enemy fire. Laurens himself was wounded, and his second in command fell back to the main force at the Tullifinny, where Moultrie was compelled to retreat towards Charleston.

Due to Laurens's connections, his activities could not escape notice; for example, in a May 5 letter to the governor of Virginia, South Carolina's lieutenant governor Thomas Bee added a postscript: "Col. John Laurens received a slight wound in the arm in a skirmish with the enemy's advanced party yesterday, & his horse was shot also – he is in a good way – pray let his father know this."

==== Battles of Savannah and Charleston ====
That fall, Laurens commanded an infantry regiment in General Benjamin Lincoln's failed assault on Savannah, Georgia.

=== Prisoner of war ===
Laurens was taken prisoner by the British in May 1780, after the fall of Charleston. As a prisoner of war, he was shipped to Philadelphia, where he was paroled with the condition that he would not leave Pennsylvania.

In Philadelphia, Laurens was able to visit his father, who would soon take ship for the Netherlands as American ambassador, in search of loans. During the voyage to his post, Henry Laurens's ship was seized by the British, resulting in the elder Laurens's imprisonment in the Tower of London.

Determined to return to South Carolina, and in the expectation of being freed by a prisoner exchange in November 1780, Laurens wrote to George Washington and requested a leave of absence from his service as aide-de-camp:

My dear General. Riveted to headquarters by my attachment to Your Excellency and the patronage with which you have been pleased to honor me, nothing but the approaching critical junction of southern affairs and the expectation of my countrymen could induce me to sollicit a farther leave of absence in case of my exchange ... I indulge a hope that my acquaintance with the country and connexions as a southern man may enable me to be of some ability in the new theatre of the war—and the present season of tranquility here, appears too favorable an opportunity to be overlooked—these motives which I submit to Your Excellency, prompt me to entreat your permission to join the southern army for the ensuing Campaign.

Washington responded, "The motives which led you to the Southward are too laudable and too important not to meet my approbation."

=== Diplomatic mission to France ===
Upon his release, Laurens was unwillingly appointed by Congress in December 1780 as a special minister to France. Preferring to return to the South, he had originally refused the post and proposed Alexander Hamilton as the better candidate. Laurens was ultimately persuaded by both Hamilton and Congress to accept the post. He wrote again to advise Washington that "unfortunately for America, Col. Hamilton was not sufficiently known to Congress to unite their suffrages in his favor and I was assured there remained no other alternative to my acceptance than the total failure of the business. Thus circumstanced I was reduced to submit—and renounce my plan of participating in the southern campaign."

In March 1781, Laurens and Thomas Paine arrived in France to assist Benjamin Franklin, who had been serving as the American minister in Paris since 1777. Together, they met with King Louis XVI, among others. Laurens gained French assurances that French ships would support American operations that year; the promised naval support was later to prove invaluable at the Siege of Yorktown.

Laurens was also reported to have told the French that without aid for the Revolution, the Americans might be forced by the British to fight against France. When Laurens and Paine returned to America in August 1781, they brought 2.5 million livres in silver, the first part of a French gift of 6 million and a loan of 10 million.

Laurens also was able to arrange a loan and supplies from the Dutch, before returning home. His father Henry Laurens, the American ambassador to the Netherlands who had been captured by the British, was exchanged for General Cornwallis in late 1781, and the senior Laurens had proceeded to the Netherlands to continue loan negotiations.

=== British surrender at Yorktown ===
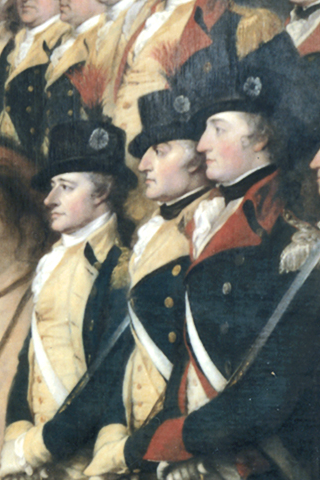
Detail of Surrender of Lord Cornwallis by John Trumbull, showing Colonels Alexander Hamilton, John Laurens, and Walter Stewart

Laurens returned from France in time to see the French fleet arrive and to join Washington in Virginia at the siege of Yorktown. He was given command of a battalion of light infantry on October 1, 1781, when its commander was killed. Laurens, under the command of Colonel Alexander Hamilton, led the battalion in the storming of Redoubt No. 10 on October 14.

British troops surrendered on October 17, 1781, and Washington appointed Laurens as the American commissioner for drafting formal terms of the British surrender. Louis-Marie, Vicomte de Noailles, a relative of Lafayette's wife, was chosen by Rochambeau to represent the interests of France. At Moore House on October 18, 1781, Laurens and the French commissioner negotiated terms with two British representatives, and the articles of capitulation were signed by General Cornwallis the following day.

=== Return to Charleston ===
Laurens returned to South Carolina, where he continued to serve in the Continental Army under General Nathanael Greene until his death. As head of Greene's "intelligence department", stationed on the outskirts of the city near Wappoo Creek, Laurens created and operated a network of spies who tracked British operations in and around Charleston, and was given responsibility for guarding Greene's lines of secret communication with the British-occupied city.

== Death ==
On August 27, 1782, at the age of 27, Laurens was shot from his saddle during the Battle of the Combahee River, as one of the last casualties of the Revolutionary War. Laurens died in what General Greene described sadly as "a paltry little skirmish" with a foraging party, only a few weeks before the British finally withdrew from Charleston.

Laurens had been confined to bed at Wappoo Creek with a raging fever for several days, possibly due to malaria. When he learned that the British were sending a large force out of Charleston to gather supplies, he left his sickbed, "wrote a hurried note to Gen. Greene, and, in disregard of his orders and the important duties with which he had been charged—a practice which the loose discipline of the American forces rendered not unusual—put off for the scene of action."

On August 26, Laurens reported to General Mordecai Gist near the Combahee River. Gist had learned that 300 British troops under Major William Brereton had already captured a ferry and crossed the river, in search of rice to feed their garrison. Gist sent a detachment with orders to attack the British before sunrise the next morning. Laurens was given orders, at his own request, to take a small force further downriver to man a redoubt at Chehaw Point, where they could fire on the British as they retreated.

Laurens and his troops stopped for the night at a plantation house near the Combahee River. Laurens got little or no sleep, instead "spending the evening in a delightful company of ladies ... [and] turned from this happy scene only two hours before he was to march down the river". With his command, Laurens left the plantation at about 3 o'clock on the morning of August 27.

Leading a force of fifty Delaware infantrymen, and an artillery captain with a howitzer, Laurens rode toward Chehaw Point. However, the British had anticipated their maneuvers; before Laurens could reach the redoubt, 140 British soldiers had prepared an ambush along the road, concealed in tall grass about one mile from his destination.

When the enemy rose to fire, Laurens ordered an immediate charge, despite the British having superior numbers and the stronger position. Gist was only two miles away, and quickly approaching with reinforcements. According to William McKennan, a captain under Laurens's command, Laurens appeared "anxious to attack the enemy previous to the main body coming up," gambling that his troops, "although few in numbers, [would be] sufficient to enable him to gain a laurel for his brow" before the end of the fighting. McKennan's opinion was that Laurens "wanted to do all himself, and have all the honor."

As Laurens led the charge, the British immediately opened fire, and Laurens fell from his horse fatally wounded. Gist's larger force arrived in time to cover a retreat, but was unable to prevent costly losses, including three American dead.

After Laurens's death, Colonel Tadeusz Kościuszko, who had been a friend of Laurens, came from North Carolina to take his place in the final weeks of battle near Charleston, also taking over Laurens's intelligence network in the area.

Laurens was buried near the site of the battle, at William Stock's plantation where he had spent the evening before his death. After Henry Laurens returned from imprisonment in London, he had his son's remains moved and reinterred on his own property, the Mepkin Plantation.

The Laurens family sold their plantation in the 19th century, where it was bought and resold by many. In 1936 it was purchased by publisher Henry Luce and his wife Clare Boothe Luce. In 1949, the Luces donated a large part of the former plantation, including an extensive landscape garden, to the Trappists for use as a monastery. As Mepkin Abbey and the Mepkin Abbey Botanical Garden, located near Moncks Corner, South Carolina, the site is open to the public, including the Laurens family graveyard on the monastery grounds.

== Personal life ==
=== Marriage and children ===
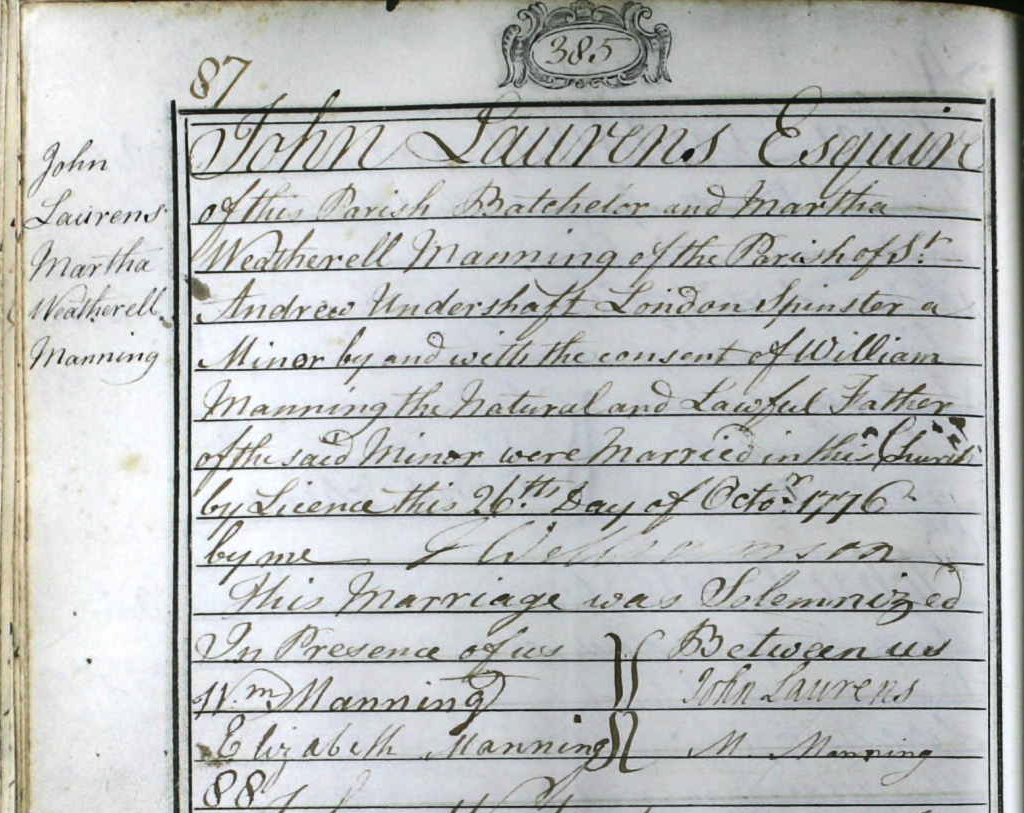
Marriage record for John Laurens and Martha Manning

On October 26, 1776, Laurens married Martha Manning in London. Her father, one of Henry Laurens's business agents, was a mentor and family friend whose home Laurens had frequently visited during his years in London. Laurens wrote to an uncle, "Pity has obliged me to marry", an unplanned marriage being necessary to preserve his honor, the reputation of the six-month pregnant Martha, and the legitimacy of their child.

Laurens and his new wife moved from London to a home in Chelsea, but Laurens was zealous in his patriotism and unwilling to remain in England, believing that honor and duty required him to fight in the American Revolution. In December 1776, he sailed for Charleston. His pregnant wife, unable to risk a months-long journey by sea during wartime, stayed behind with her family in London.

Laurens's only child, their daughter Frances Eleanor Laurens (1777–1860), was born c. January 1777 and baptized on February 18, 1777. Laurens's father-in-law wrote to him that the infant had "undergone much pain, & misery by a swelling in her hip, & thigh, I believe from a hurt by the carelessness of the nurse". Fanny was not expected to live, but by July 1777, she had recovered from a successful surgery to her hip. At the age of eight, after the loss of both parents, Fanny was brought to Charleston in May 1785, and was raised there by John Laurens's sister Martha Laurens Ramsay and her husband. Against the wishes of the Ramsays, Fanny eloped in 1795 with Francis Henderson, a Scottish merchant. Later in life, she was married to James Cunnington, and died in South Carolina at the age of 83.

Laurens had one grandson, Francis Henderson Jr. (1797–1847), a South Carolina lawyer who died young after struggling with alcoholism, and who did not marry or have children.

=== Sexuality and relationship with Alexander Hamilton ===
As a young man in Geneva, from ages 16 to 19, Laurens "never had difficulty attracting women and men", while reserving "his primary emotional commitments for other men." According to Laurens's biographer Gregory D. Massey, this period "marked the beginning of a pattern; he continually centered his life around homosocial attachments to other men." Homosociality, in sociology, refers to same-sex relationships that are not of a romantic or sexual nature, such as friendship, mentorship, and male bonding.

Shortly after his marriage, while in Washington's camp, Laurens met and became extremely close friends with Alexander Hamilton. They exchanged many letters during the several years when different assignments and Laurens's capture by the British kept them apart; for example, when the terms of Laurens's parole prevented him from being present at Hamilton's wedding to Elizabeth Schuyler in December 1780, even though Hamilton had invited him. While emotional language was not uncommon in romantic friendships among those of the same gender in this historical period, Hamilton biographer James Thomas Flexner stated that the intensely expressive language contained in the Hamilton-Laurens letters "raises questions concerning homosexuality" that "cannot be categorically answered".

Stating that "one must tread gingerly in approaching this matter," Hamilton biographer Ron Chernow wrote that it is impossible to say "with any certainty" that Laurens and Hamilton were lovers, noting that such an affair would have required the exercise of "extraordinary precautions" because sodomy was a capital offense throughout the colonies at the time. Chernow concluded that based on available evidence, "At the very least, we can say that Hamilton developed something like an adolescent crush on his friend." According to Chernow, "Hamilton did not form friendships easily and never again revealed his interior life to another man as he had to Laurens", and after Laurens's death, "Hamilton shut off some compartment of his emotions and never reopened it."

In contrast to Hamilton's effusive letters, surviving letters from Laurens to Hamilton were notably less frequent and less passionately worded, although some letters written by Laurens have been lost or may have been destroyed.

Massey has dismissed speculations on John Laurens's supposed homosexuality and on a Laurens–Hamilton relationship as unsubstantiated, concluding, "Their relationship was platonic, a bond formed by their devotion to the Revolution and mutual ambition for fame." Years later, Massey regretted that the tone of his assertion had been decisive rather than equivocal, conceding that the matter "can not be definitively resolved."

== Legacy ==
=== In popular culture ===
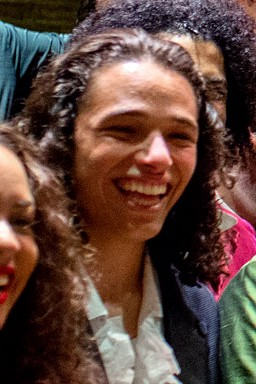
Anthony Ramos in Hamilton costume, July 2015

John Laurens was the subject of two short educational films, both released in 1972 by Learning Corporation of America. Based on Laurens's correspondence with his father, the first film "The Cause Of Liberty", dramatized the young man's decision to leave England, and the second "The Impossible War" outlined his battles in the Continental Army and his death. Michael Douglas played the leading role of Laurens. Keene Curtis played his father, Henry. Gretchen Corbett played his wife, but was given the name Patty rather than her actual name of Martha.

Laurens was featured in an episode of the 1984 George Washington miniseries, portrayed by Kevin Conroy.

Laurens was depicted as a supporting character in the 2015 musical Hamilton. Anthony Ramos originated the role of Laurens in the off-Broadway and Broadway casts, including the 2020 film of the stage production. Laurens has also been portrayed in the Broadway company of Hamilton by Jordan Fisher.

=== Historical tributes ===
In October 1782, Alexander Hamilton wrote to General Nathanael Greene of Laurens's death:

I feel the deepest affliction at the news we have just received at the loss of our dear and inestimable friend Laurens. His career of virtue is at end. How strangely are human affairs conducted, that so many excellent qualities could not ensure a more happy fate! The world will feel the loss of a man who has left few like him behind; and America, of a citizen whose heart realized that patriotism of which others only talk. I feel the loss of a friend whom I truly and most tenderly loved, and one of a very small number.

In 1834, Hamilton's son and biographer John Church Hamilton named his youngest son Laurens Hamilton, a name that continued to recur over several generations in that branch of the Hamilton family.

Nathanael Greene, in general orders announcing the death of Laurens, wrote "The army has lost a brave officer and the public a worthy citizen."

Three years after Laurens's death, George Washington responded to a question about Laurens's character by stating that "no man possessed more of the amor patria [love of country]. In a word, he had not a fault, that I ever could discover, unless intrepidity bordering upon rashness could come under that denomination; and to this he was excited by the purest motives."

Gregory D. Massey, a history professor at Freed–Hardeman University and author of a Laurens biography, wrote in 2003 that "Laurens speaks more clearly to us today than other men of the American Revolution whose names are far more familiar." Massey attributed the modern relevance of Laurens to his expressed belief, uncommon among his southern political contemporaries,

that blacks shared a similar nature with whites, which included a natural right to liberty. "We have sunk the Africans & their descendants below the Standard of Humanity," he wrote, "and almost render'd them incapable of that Blessing which equal Heaven bestow'd upon us all." Whereas other men considered property the basis of liberty, Laurens believed liberty that rested on the sweat of slaves was not deserving of the name. To that extent, at least, his beliefs make him our contemporary, a man worthy of more attention than the footnote he has been in most accounts of the American Revolution.

=== Geographical names ===
- Laurens County, Georgia, was named in honor of John Laurens.
- The city of Laurens, South Carolina, and Laurens County, South Carolina, were named for both Laurens and his father Henry Laurens.
