= Henry Laurens =

American Founding Father, slave trader, and merchant

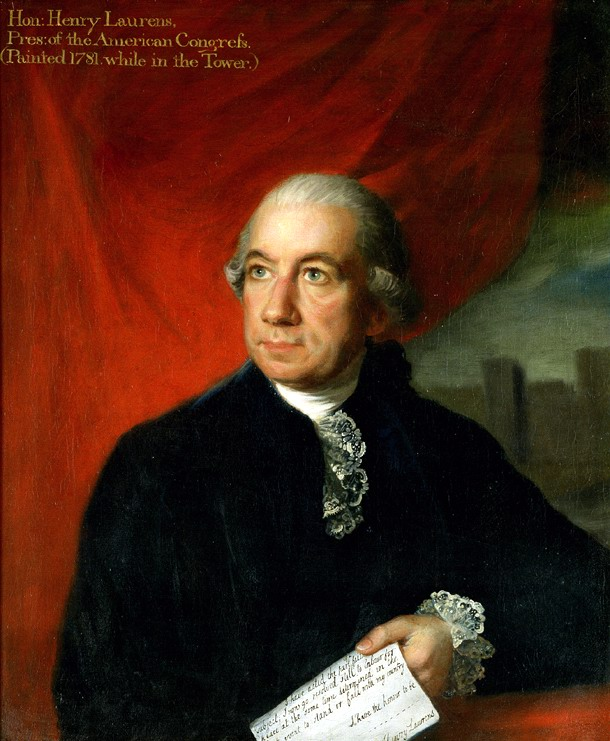
- Portrait by Lemuel Francis Abbott, 1781

President of the Continental Congress
- In office November 1, 1777 – December 9, 1778
- Preceded by: John Hancock
- Succeeded by: John Jay

Vice President of South Carolina
- In office March 26, 1776 – June 27, 1777
- President: John Rutledge
- Preceded by: Office established
- Succeeded by: James Parsons

President of the South Carolina Committee on Safety
- In office January 9, 1775 – March 26, 1776
- Preceded by: Lord William Campbell; As governor of South Carolina
- Succeeded by: John Rutledge; As president of South Carolina

Personal details
- Born: March 6, 1724 Charles Town, South Carolina, British America
- Died: December 8, 1792 (aged 68) Charleston, South Carolina, U.S.
- Spouse: Eleanor Delamere Ball Laurens (m. 1750; d. 1770)
- Children: 13 or more, including John Laurens, Martha Laurens Ramsay, Henry Laurens, Jr., and Mary Eleanor Laurens Pinckney

Henry Laurens (March 6, 1724 [O.S. February 24, 1723] – December 8, 1792) was an American Founding Father, merchant, slave trader, and rice planter from South Carolina who became a political leader during the Revolutionary War. A delegate to the Second Continental Congress, Laurens succeeded John Hancock as its president. He was a signatory to the Articles of Confederation and, as president, presided over its passage.

Laurens had earned great wealth as a partner in the largest slave-trading house in North America, Austin and Laurens. In the 1750s alone, this Charleston firm oversaw the sale of more than 8,000 enslaved Africans. Laurens served for a time as vice president of South Carolina and as the United States minister to the Dutch Republic during the Revolutionary War. He was captured at sea by the British and imprisoned for a little more than a year in the Tower of London. His oldest son, John Laurens, was an aide-de-camp to George Washington and a colonel in the Continental Army.

== Early life ==
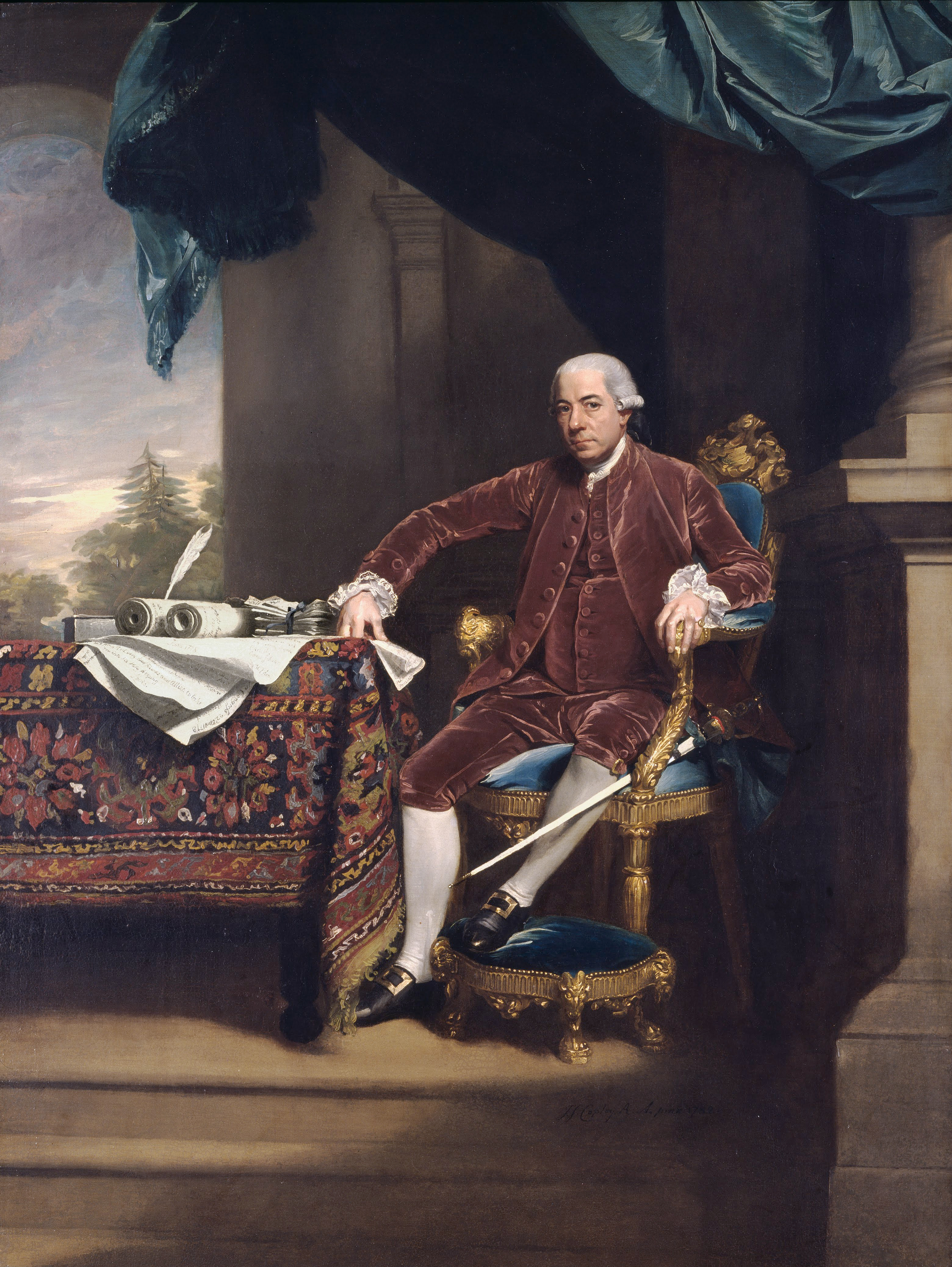
Portrait of Henry Laurens by John Singleton Copley, 1782

Laurens's forebears were Huguenots who fled France after the Edict of Nantes was revoked in 1685. His grandfather Andre Laurens left earlier, in 1682, and eventually made his way to America, settling first in New York City and then Charleston, South Carolina. Andre's son John married Hester (or Esther) Grasset, also a Huguenot refugee. Henry was their third child and eldest son. John Laurens became a saddler, and his business eventually grew to be the largest of its kind in the colonies. In 1744, Laurens was sent to London to augment his business training. This took place in the company of Richard Oswald. His father died in 1747, bequeathing a considerable estate to 23-year-old Henry.

== Marriage and family ==
Laurens married Eleanor Ball, also of a South Carolina rice planter family, on June 25, 1750. They had thirteen children, many of whom died in infancy or childhood. Eleanor died in 1770, one month after giving birth to their last child. Laurens took their three sons to England for their education, encouraging their oldest, John Laurens, to study law. Instead of completing his studies, John Laurens returned to the United States in 1776 to serve in the American Revolutionary War.

== Political career ==
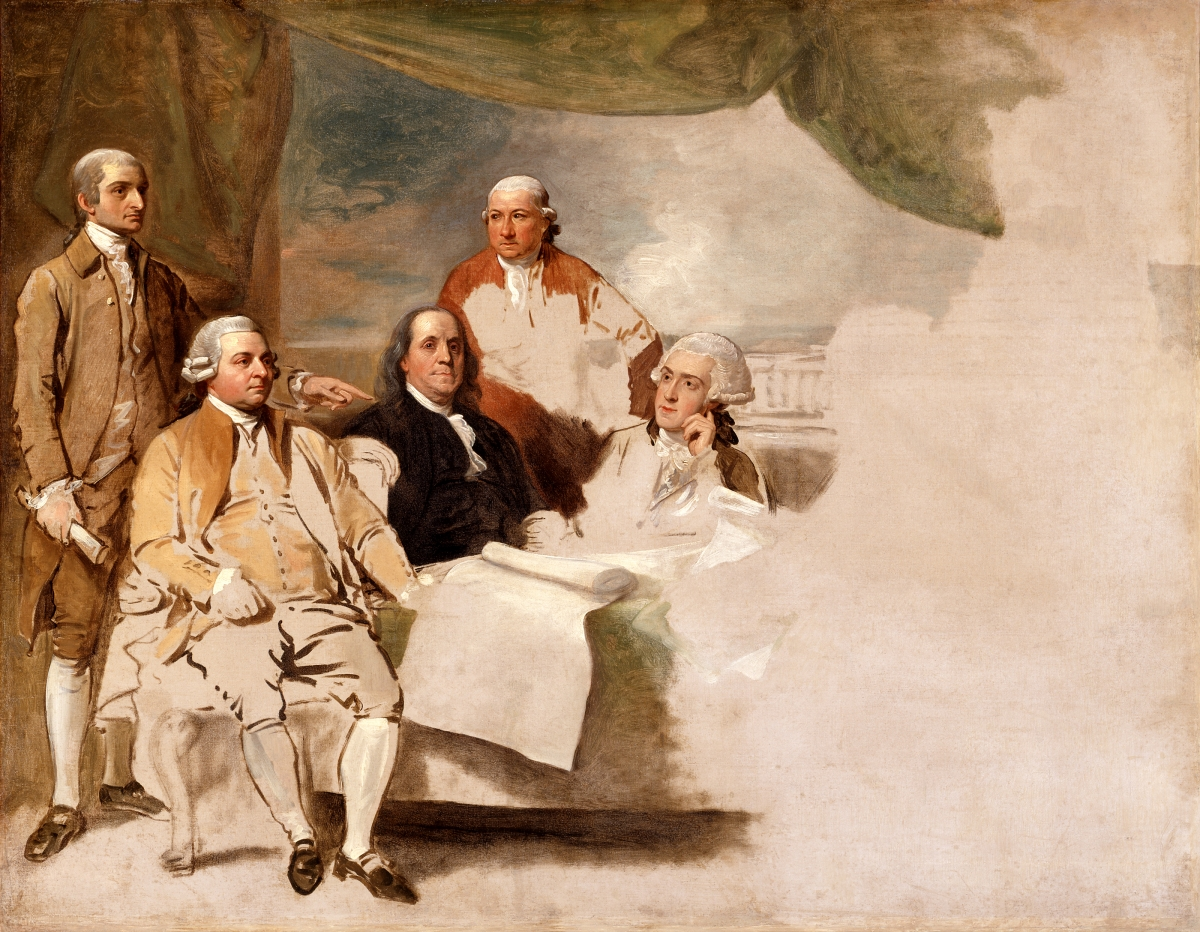
Treaty of Paris, 1783 painting by Benjamin West (left to right: John Jay, John Adams, Benjamin Franklin, Laurens, and William Temple Franklin)

Laurens served in the militia, as did most able-bodied men in his time. He rose to the rank of lieutenant colonel in the campaigns against the Cherokee Indians in 1757–1761, during the French and Indian War (also known as the Seven Years' War). In 1757, he was elected to South Carolina's colonial assembly. Laurens was elected again every year but one until the Revolution replaced the assembly with a state convention as an interim government. The year he missed was 1773, when he visited England to arrange for his sons' educations. He was named to the colony's council in 1764 and 1768 but declined both times. In 1772, he joined the American Philosophical Society of Philadelphia and carried on extensive correspondence with other members.

As colonial tensions with Great Britain increased, Laurens was at first inclined to support reconciliation with the Crown. But as relations deteriorated, he came to fully support the Patriot cause. When Carolina began to create a revolutionary government, Laurens was elected to the Provincial Congress, which first met on January 9, 1775. He was president of the Committee of Safety and presiding officer of that congress from June until March 1776. When South Carolina installed a fully independent government, he served as the vice president of South Carolina from March 1776 to June 27, 1777. Laurens was first named a delegate to the Continental Congress on January 10, 1777. He served in the Congress until 1780. He was the president of the Continental Congress from November 1, 1777, to December 9, 1778.

In the fall of 1779, Congress named Laurens their minister to the Dutch Republic. In early 1780, he took up that post and successfully negotiated Dutch support for the war. On his return voyage to Amsterdam that fall, the Royal Navy frigate Vestal intercepted the ship he was travelling on, the Continental packet boat Mercury, off the banks of Newfoundland. Although his dispatches were tossed in the water, they were retrieved by the British, who discovered the draft of a planned American-Dutch treaty prepared in Aix-la-Chapelle in 1778 by William Lee and the Amsterdam banker Jean de Neufville. This prompted Britain to declare war on the Dutch Republic, initiating the Fourth Anglo-Dutch War.

The British, having captured Laurens, transported him to England. There, he was charged with treason and imprisoned in the Tower of London, becoming the only American to ever be held there. His imprisonment was protested by Congress; in the field, most captives were regarded as prisoners of war, and while conditions were frequently appalling, prisoner exchanges and mail privileges were accepted practice. During his imprisonment, Laurens was assisted by Oswald, his former business partner and the principal owner of Bunce Island, a slave-trading island base in the Sierra Leone River. Oswald argued on Laurens's behalf to the British government. Finally, on December 31, 1781, he was released in exchange for General Charles Cornwallis and completed his voyage to Amsterdam. There, he helped raise funds for the Patriot war effort.

Laurens's oldest son, Colonel John Laurens, was killed in 1782 in the Battle of the Combahee River, as one of the last casualties of the Revolutionary War. He had supported enlisting and freeing slaves for the war effort and suggested to his father that he begin with the 40 he stood to inherit. John had urged his father to free the family's slaves, but although conflicted, Laurens never manumitted his 260 slaves.

In 1783, Laurens was sent to Paris as one of the peace commissioners for the negotiations leading to the Treaty of Paris. While he was not a signatory of the primary treaty, he was instrumental in reaching the secondary accords that resolved issues related to the Dutch Republic and Spain. Oswald was the principal negotiator for the British during the Paris peace talks.

Laurens generally retired from public life in 1784. He was sought for a return to the Continental Congress, the Constitutional Convention in 1787 and the state assembly, but he declined all of these positions. He did serve in the state convention of 1788, where he voted to ratify the United States Constitution. British forces, during their occupation of Charleston, had burned the Laurens home at Mepkin during the war. When Laurens and his family returned in 1784, they lived in an outbuilding while the great house was rebuilt. He lived on the estate the rest of his life, working to recover the estimated £40,000 that the revolution had cost him (equivalent to about $8.12 million in 2024).

== Death and legacy ==
Laurens suffered from gout starting in his 40s and the affliction plagued him throughout the rest of his life. Laurens died on December 8, 1792, at his estate, Mepkin, in South Carolina. In his will he stated he wished to be cremated and his ashes be interred at his estate. It is reported that he was the first Caucasian cremation in the United States, which he chose because of a fear of being buried alive. Afterward, the estate passed through several hands. Large portions of the estate still exist. Part of the original estate was donated to the Roman Catholic Church in 1949 and is now the location of Mepkin Abbey, a monastery of the Order of Cistercians of the Strict Observance (Trappist monks).

The city of Laurens, South Carolina, and its county are named for him. The town and the village of Laurens, New York, are named for him. Laurens County, Georgia, is named for his son John. General Lachlan McIntosh, who worked for Laurens as a clerk and became close friends with him, named Fort Laurens in Ohio after him.

== Citations ==
Political offices
Preceded by John Hancock	President of the Continental Congress; November 1, 1777 – December 9, 1778	Succeeded by John Jay
