= Martha Laurens Ramsay =

American diarist and letter writer (1759–1811)

Martha Laurens
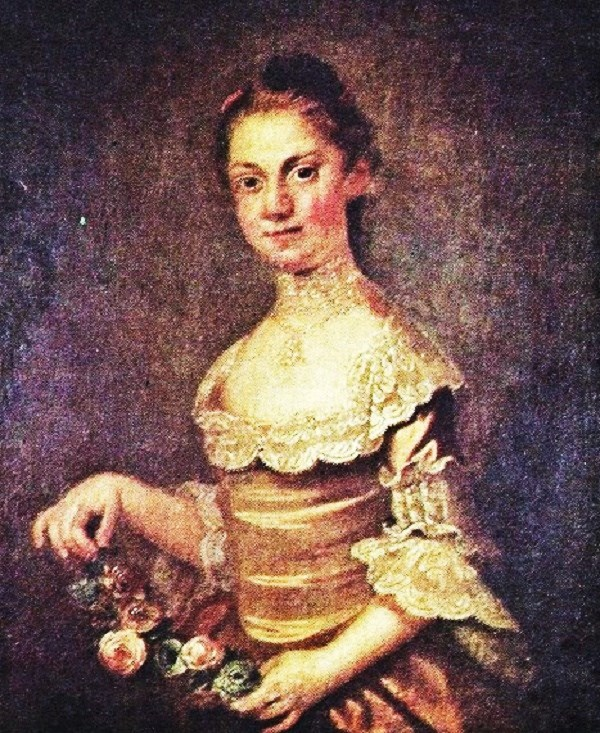
- Portrait of Martha Laurens as a child, painted c. 1767 by John Wollaston
- Born: November 3, 1759; Charleston, Province of South Carolina
- Died: June 10, 1811 (aged 51); Charleston, South Carolina, U.S.
- Spouse: David Ramsay (m. 1787)
- Parents: Henry Laurens; Eleanor Delamere Ball Laurens
- Relatives: John Laurens (brother)

Martha Laurens Ramsay (November 3, 1759 – June 10, 1811) was an American woman from Charleston, South Carolina. A daughter of Henry Laurens, she was married to Dr. David Ramsay. Her diary and private letters, which were published by her husband after her death under the title Memoirs of the Life of Martha Laurens Ramsay, provide a historically valuable account of a Southern woman's life during the American Revolutionary War and the early years of the nation.

== Early life ==
Martha Laurens was born in Charleston, South Carolina on November 3, 1759, to Eleanor Ball and Henry Laurens. Her father, a wealthy plantation owner and slave trader, was an elected member of the South Carolina Assembly before joining the Second Continental Congress.

She was able to read by the age of three.

In 1770, her mother died and Martha was sent to live with her uncle, James Laurens. In 1775, Martha moved to England with her uncle and his family. However, when the politics became overwhelming, they moved to France. This European sojourn most likely is the reason why Martha's letters reflect so little on the struggles of the Americans during the American Revolution.

During the American Revolutionary War, Henry Laurens became president of the Second Continental Congress in Philadelphia, serving from 1777 to 1778. Later in the war, while on a diplomatic mission to Europe, he was captured at sea by the British and imprisoned in The Tower of London. In 1782, after his release, Martha's father joined her and the rest of the family in France. Martha spent 1783 and 1784 with her father, assisting him with treatment of his gout.

== Marriage and family ==
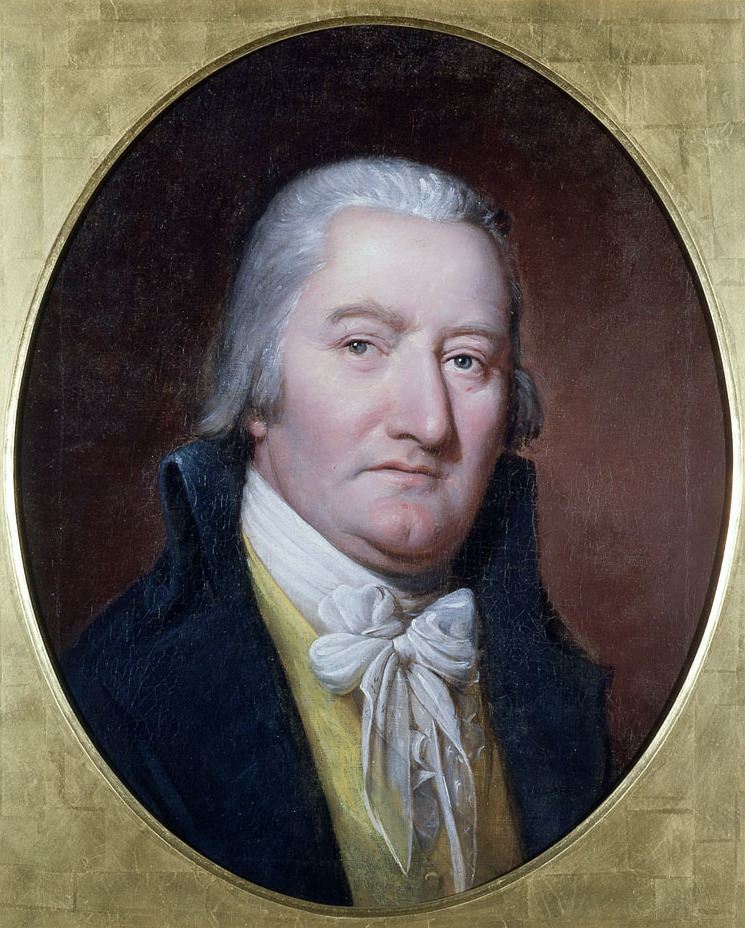
David Ramsay in 1796

In 1784, she sailed back to Charleston, where she met her father's physician, David Ramsay. They were married on January 28, 1787; Ramsay had been married twice before. In addition to being a prominent physician, Ramsay was a politician and historian, who wrote the first history of South Carolina in the American Revolution.

As Ramsay's wife, Martha experienced financial hardship; David Ramsay declared insolvency in the late 1790s, and was sued by Martha's brother in bankruptcy proceedings. She felt that her faith was being tested, leading her to a sense of religious resignation. She took it upon herself to take responsibility for the "kins-keeping" of the Laurens family; she and her husband adopted her niece Frances Eleanor Laurens, the daughter of her late brother John Laurens, after his death as one of the last casualties of the Revolutionary War and his wife's death in Europe.

Martha Laurens Ramsay died in 1811 in Charleston, at the age of 51. She was buried in the churchyard of the Circular Congregational Church in Charleston.

Six weeks after her death, her diary and private letters were published by her husband, under the title Memoirs of the Life of Martha Laurens Ramsay. Her memoirs remain historically valuable as a chronicle of the life of an educated privileged Southern woman during the American Revolutionary War and the early years of the nation.

== Children ==
Martha Laurens Ramsay and David Ramsay had eleven children, of whom eight survived to adulthood. Her children and stepchildren included:

- John Witherspoon Ramsay (1784–1813), Ramsay's son from his previous marriage.
- Eleanor Henry Laurens Ramsay (1787–1857)
- Martha Henry Laurens Ramsay (1789–1844)
- Frances Henry Laurens Ramsay (1790-1791)
- Catharine Henry Laurens Ramsay (1792–1876)
- Sabina Elliot Ramsay (1794–1853), who married Henry Laurens Pinckney (son of Charles Pinckney).
- David Laurens Ramsay (1795–1826), who married Mary Eleanor Laurens Pinckney (daughter of Charles Pinckney).
- Jane Montgomery Ramsay (born 1796)
- James Ramsay (1797–1832)
- Jane Montgomery Ramsay (born 1799)
- Nathaniel Ramsay (born 1801)
- William Ramsay (born 1802)
