= First (Scots) Presbyterian Church =

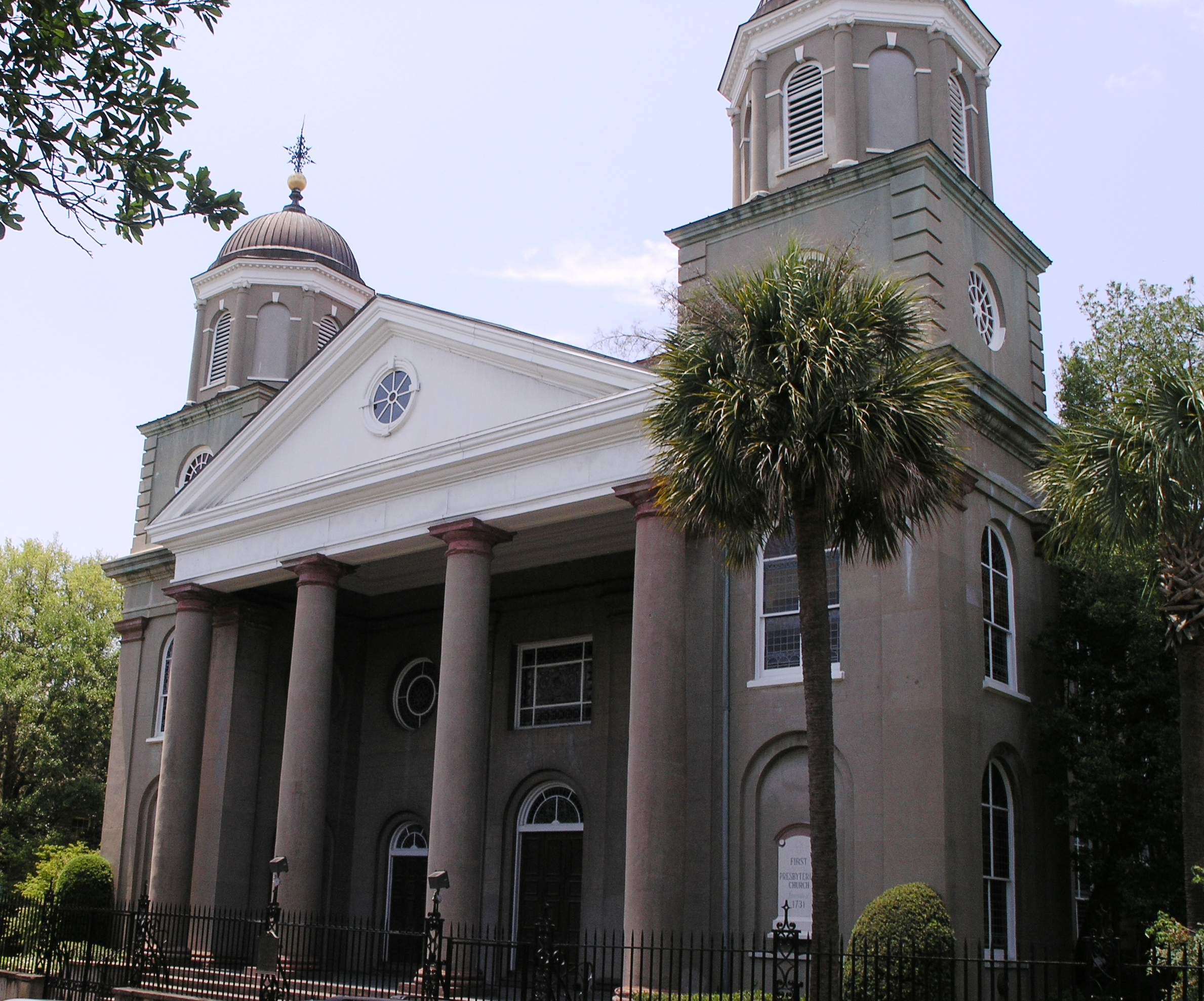
- First (Scots) Presbyterian Church is located at 53 Meeting St., Charleston, South Carolina
- First (Scots) Presbyterian Church
- 32°46′34.759″N 79°55′50.738″W
- Location: 53 Meeting Street, Charleston, South Carolina
- Country: United States
- Denomination: Presbyterian
- Website: First Scots Presbyterian Church

First (Scots) Presbyterian Church (locally known as "First Scots") is a historic church located at 53 Meeting St., Charleston, South Carolina. The congregation was established in 1731 when a dozen Scottish residents left the Independent Church of Charleston, now called the Circular Congregational Church.

== History ==
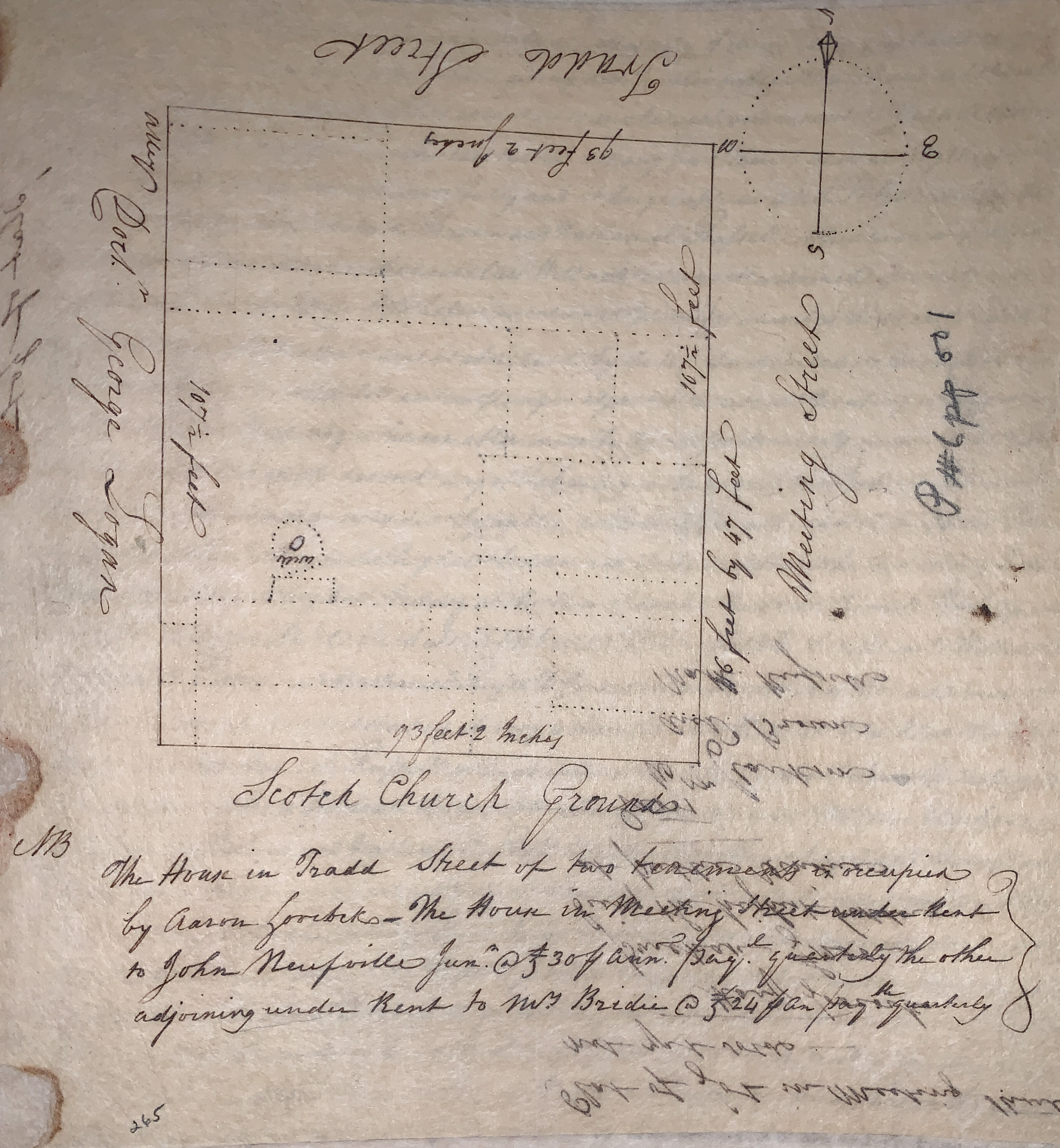
A plat of the grounds of First Scots Presbyterian c. 1795 shows tenements that occupied the parcel.

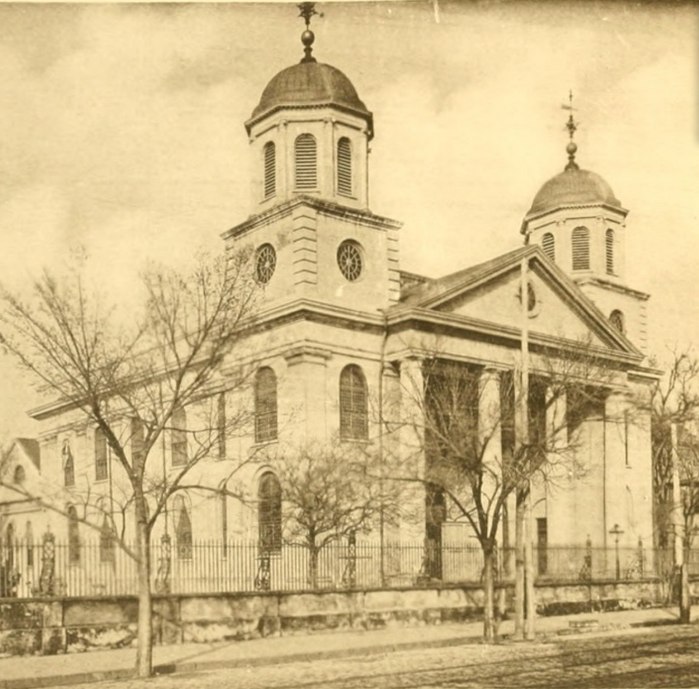
First Scots was photographed here in 1892.

The current building was constructed in 1814, making it the fifth oldest church building in the city.

The buildings design was inspired by Baltimore Basilica in Baltimore, Maryland.It contains a number of Scottish symbols in the stained glass windows and a symbol of Scotland – the thistle, on the wrought iron grilles. The building was built by Scottish brothers John and James Gordon. Their building replaced an earlier, wooden church, whose location is marked in the churchyard with tartan flags.

The church has two bell towers, but its bells were donated to the military during the Civil War. For years after, the story was told that the bells were never replaced to honor the Confederate dead. In 1999, a bell, built in 1814, was reinstalled in the northern tower. St. Johns Church in Preston, Lancashire, England, had had eight bells in its own historic church, but no longer needed them when a replacement set was acquired. One bell had been damaged, but seven were passed to a British bell company. First Scots made plans to bring the seven working bells to Charleston and hang them in their towers. The southern tower, however, was found to be too weakened from the 1886 Charleston earthquake to support the six smaller bells. Still, the largest of the bells from St. Johns was hung in the northern tower. The bell - which weighs 1,470 pounds and is 43 inches in diameter, was funded in large part by congregant Bonnie Workman; the bell is named "Bonnie" in her honor.
