= Circular Congregational Church =

- Parish House of the Circular Congregational Church
- U.S. National Register of Historic Places
- U.S. National Historic Landmark
- U.S. National Historic Landmark District – Contributing property
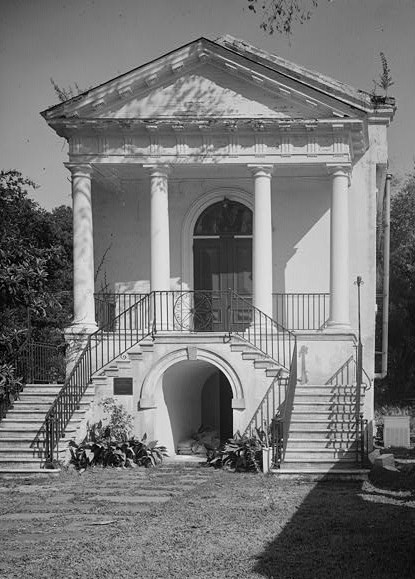
- Parish House of the Circular Church

- Location within South Carolina Location within the United States
- Location: 150 Meeting Street, Charleston, South Carolina
- Coordinates: 32°46′44″N 79°55′52″W
- Built: 1870 (parish house); 1892 (church)
- Architect: Robert Mills (parish house); Stephenson & Greene (church)
- Architectural style: Greek Revival, Romanesque
- Part of: Charleston Historic District (ID66000964)
- NRHP reference No.: 73001683

Significant dates
- Added to NRHP: November 7, 1973
- Designated NHL: November 7, 1973
- Designated NHLDCP: October 9, 1960

The Circular Congregational Church is a historic church building at 150 Meeting Street in Charleston, South Carolina, used by a congregation established in 1681. Its parish house, the Parish House of the Circular Congregational Church, is a highly significant Greek Revival architectural work by Robert Mills and is recognized as a U.S. National Historic Landmark.

== History ==
=== Colonial origins ===
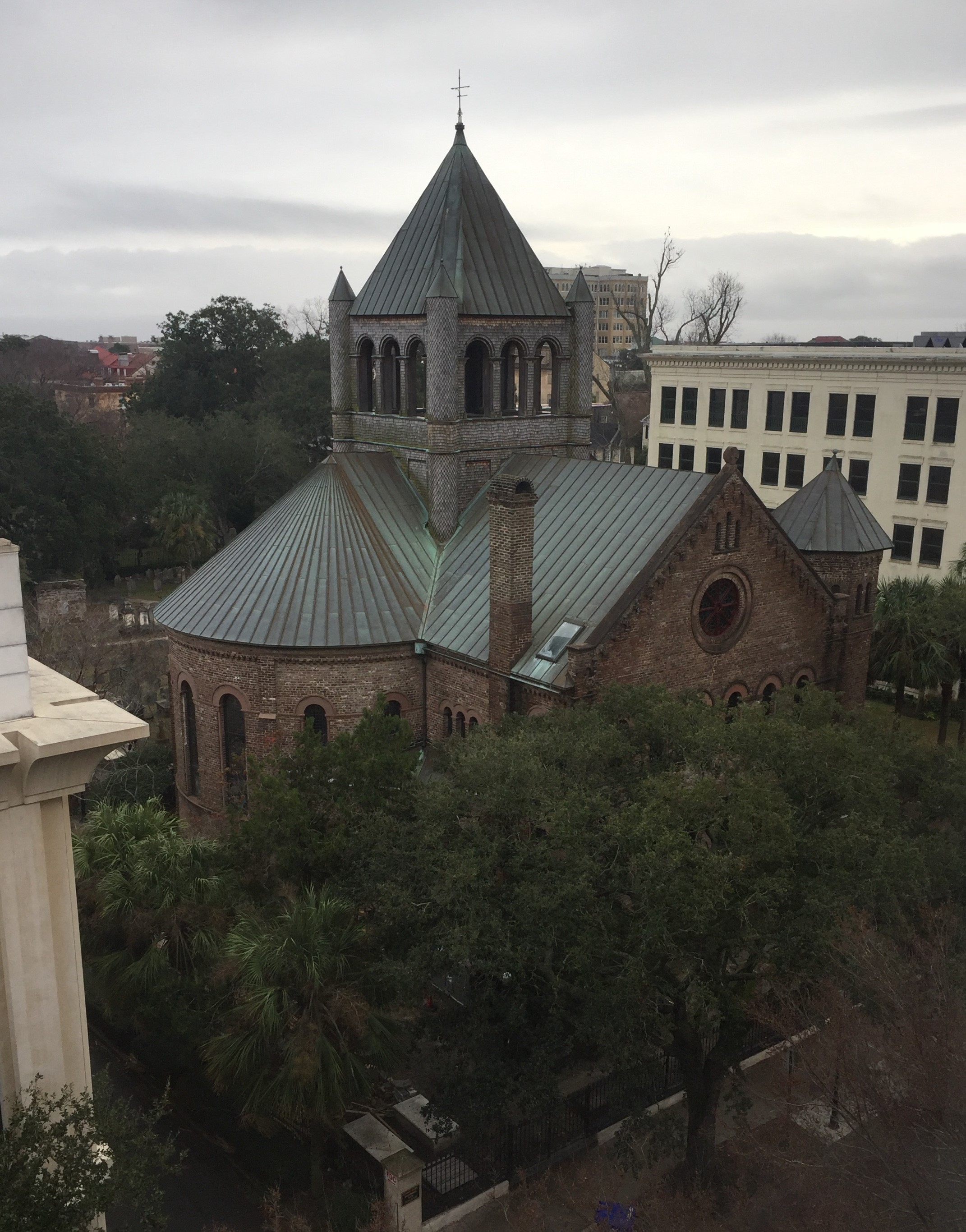
Circular Church

The congregation was co-founded with Charles Towne, 1680–1685, by the English Congregationalists, Scots Presbyterians, and French Huguenots of the original settlement. These "dissenters" erected a Meeting House in the northwest corner of the walled city. The present sanctuary occupies that exact site. The street leading to it was called "Meeting House Street," later shortened to Meeting Street.

The earliest records of the church were lost when a hurricane swept them from the manse, located at White Point (the Battery), in 1713. During the colonial period, this unusual church had no official name but "suffered itself to be called either Presbyterian, Congregational, or Independent: sometimes by one of the names, sometimes by two of them, and at other times by all three. We do not find that this church is either Presbyterian, Congregational, or Independent, but somewhat distinct and singular from them all."

Many of the early ministers hailed from Scotland, England, Wales, and New England. The "old White Meeting House" was enlarged in 1732, only a year after 12 Scots families moved down the street to start the First (Scots) Presbyterian Church with a stricter Presbyterian government and doctrine. While many Presbyterians remained, the policy of this church "was not so much to define exactly a particular mode of their discipline, and to bind their hands up to any one stiff form adopted either by Presbyterians, Congregationalists, or Independents, as to be upon a broad dissenting bottom, and to leave ourselves as free as possible from any foreign shackles, that no moderate persons of either denomination might be afraid to join them. "

Shaped by its independent mind and goaded by a colonial government that treated "dissenters" (non-Anglicans) with contempt, the church became a greenhouse for revolutionary sentiment in the colony. Prominent members of the Meeting House, and its distinguished minister, William Tennent (1772–1777), were frequently heard speaking for political and religious freedom. Tennent took his life in his hands when he made a wide tour of the Carolina back-country in 1775 to gain subscribers for the cause of independence.

The Archdale Street Meeting House separated in 1817 as the Second Independent Church, and later it adopted the name Unitarian. The congregation of Circular Church remained trinitarian under the pastoral leadership of the Rev. Benjamin Morgan Palmer (1813–1835). Noteworthy is the fact that Palmer was a special son of this church, born in Philadelphia just two weeks after his parents had been driven into exile there in 1781.

=== Revolutionary War ===
The church was struck by a British cannonball during the siege of Charleston in 1780. When the British occupied the city, the church was bitterly rewarded for its love of freedom by the illegal exile of 38 heads of families to prisons in St. Augustine and then to Philadelphia. Their families were left destitute. The Meeting House, vacant since the cannonball episode, was used as a British hospital and/or a warehouse, with the pews destroyed and the building suffering other damage. Tennent had died in 1777, and the church went without a minister throughout the British occupation until the end of the war.

In 1782, the church-in-exile held a congregational meeting in Philadelphia where they made arrangements to call a minister to Charleston "as soon as may be feasible." Members remaining in Charleston began the week of British evacuation to rebuild the Meeting House. By 1787, the congregation had built a second meeting house on Archdale Street to accommodate their growing number. For 25 years, Drs. Hollinshead and Keith, co-pastors of the church, preached one sermon in both houses each Sunday, alternating morning and afternoon services.

=== Robert Mills' "Extraordinary" building ===
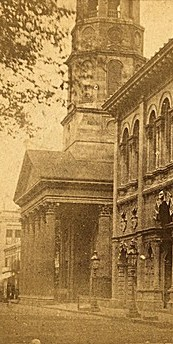
The portico and steeple base of the Circular Church in 1860

In 1804, the time had come to replace the Meeting Street house with a more commodious building. Martha Laurens Ramsay proposed a circular form, and Robert Mills, Charleston's leading architect who also designed the Washington Monument, completed the plans. The church he designed was a Pantheon-type building 88 feet (27 m) in diameter with seven great doors and 26 windows. On its main floor and in the gallery it was said to accommodate 2,000 worshippers. The first major domed building in North America, it was described by one observer in 1818 as "the most extraordinary building in the United States." However, people made fun of the fact that the church lacked a steeple and for years laughed at the rhyme:

Charleston is a pious place
And full of pious people
They built a church on Meeting Street
But could not raise the steeple.

The people of Circular Church, as it was now popularly called, stopped the laughter in 1838 by raising a New England–style steeple that towered 182 feet (55 m) above Meeting Street.

=== From glory to destruction ===
During the "glory days" of 1820–1860, Circular Church had a large congregation of white and black members. The first Sunday School for religious education in South Carolina was started here in 1816, and members founded the Charleston Bible Society, a prototype to the later American Bible Society. The membership included two governors of the state, prominent senators, the editor of the Charleston Courier, and many others whose voices made Charleston eloquent and who extended the influence of their church far beyond its walls. It also included many slaves and poor whose names were unknown to anyone beyond its walls.

The walls of the Circular Church were not long to stand. On December 11, 1861, a fire started near the Cooper River. During the night, the fire swept all the way across the city, destroying the church building. The American Civil War soon followed with its devastating effect. The black members of the church withdrew in 1867 to form the Plymouth Congregational Church. In January 1888, the congregation began the process of removing the materials from the old church. The a new sanctuary was completed in 1890.

== Beliefs and service ==
The independent or Circular Church joined the Congregational Association in 1882, the United Church of Christ (its successor) in 1954, and Atlantic Presbytery of the United Presbyterian Church (U.S.A.) in 1968. It is one of the few congregation in the South that expresses its ecumenical commitment by belonging to two denominations. The church follows Jesus Christ in the radical way of progressive Christianity. Followers believe the Bible is truthful but not literal, that God is a living Presence but not a dominating man in the sky, that Jesus is a person of the Spirit and of saving wisdom but not a sacrifice to an offended God.

Circular Church is aware of the needs of people on the margins of society. The church has founded the city's first marriage and family counseling center, Charleston's crisis intervention service (Hotline), Hospice of Charleston, and the Elder Shelter. Space and leadership have been provided to the Charleston Interfaith Crisis Ministry, Amnesty International, Alcoholics Anonymous, Narcotics Anonymous, Charleston PEACE, and other community organizations.

The congregation, international and multiracial, has been served for 15 years by part-time clergy, a reminder to the congregation that every member is called to priesthood and ministry. Visitors are welcome both to explore the grounds and to explore the faith in worship, ministry, and life in community.

== Buildings ==
The current church building was built in the Richardsonian Romanesque beginning in 1890 (the third on its site), to plans by Stephenson & Greene of New York. The original sanctuary was designed by Robert Mills. The current church is not circular but of a modified cloverleaf design and continues to be known as the Circular Church. The parish house, with twin stairways and wrought iron railings, was declared a National Historic Landmark in 1973.

== Gallery ==
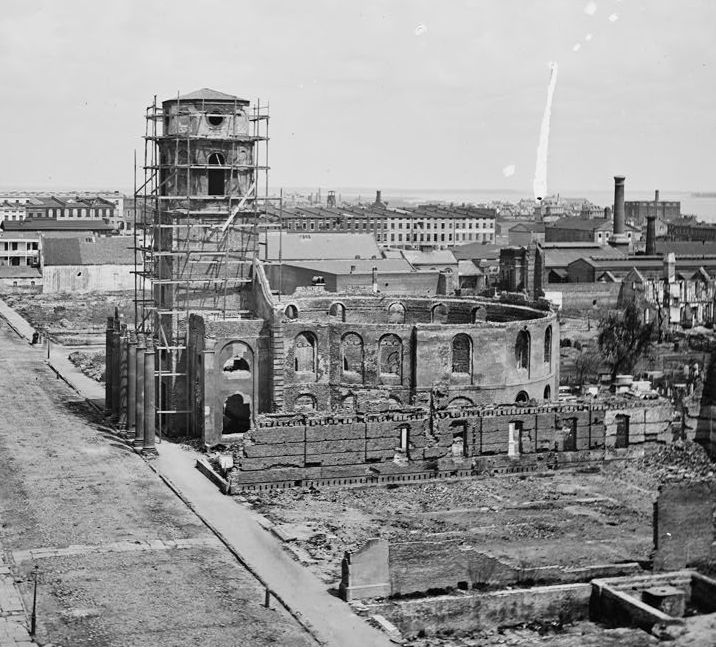
The ruins of the Circular Church in 1865 still showed the clear circular layout of the building designed by Robert Mills

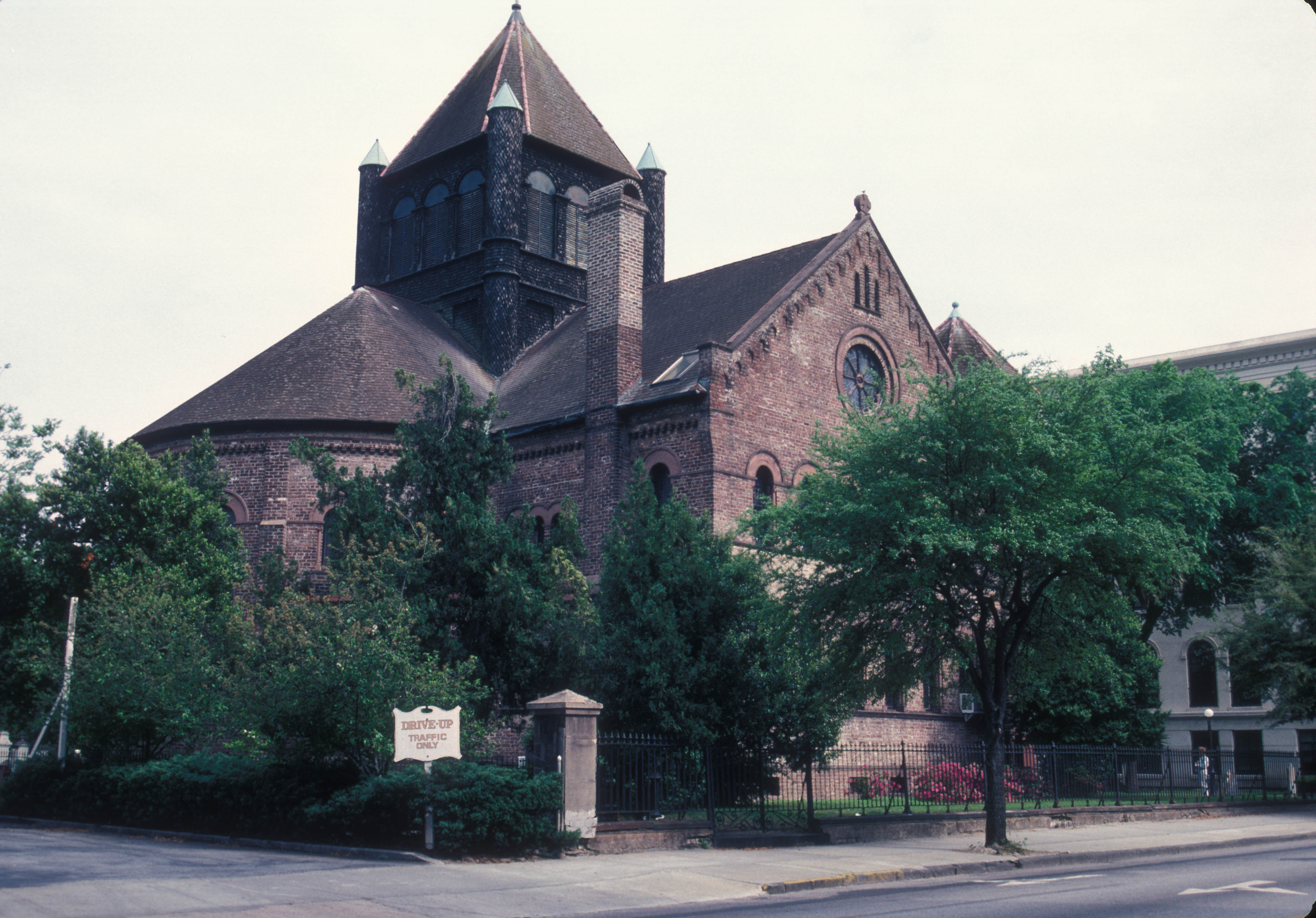
The current church building dates from 1890 but uses bricks from the earlier church

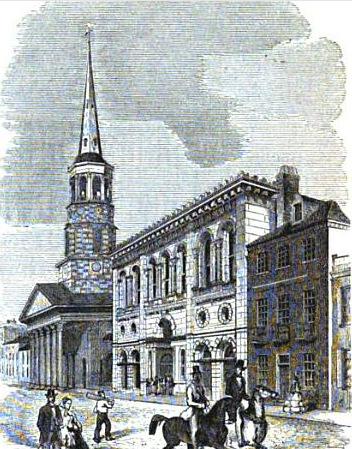
The steeple of Mills' design is seen in this June 1857 image from Harper's

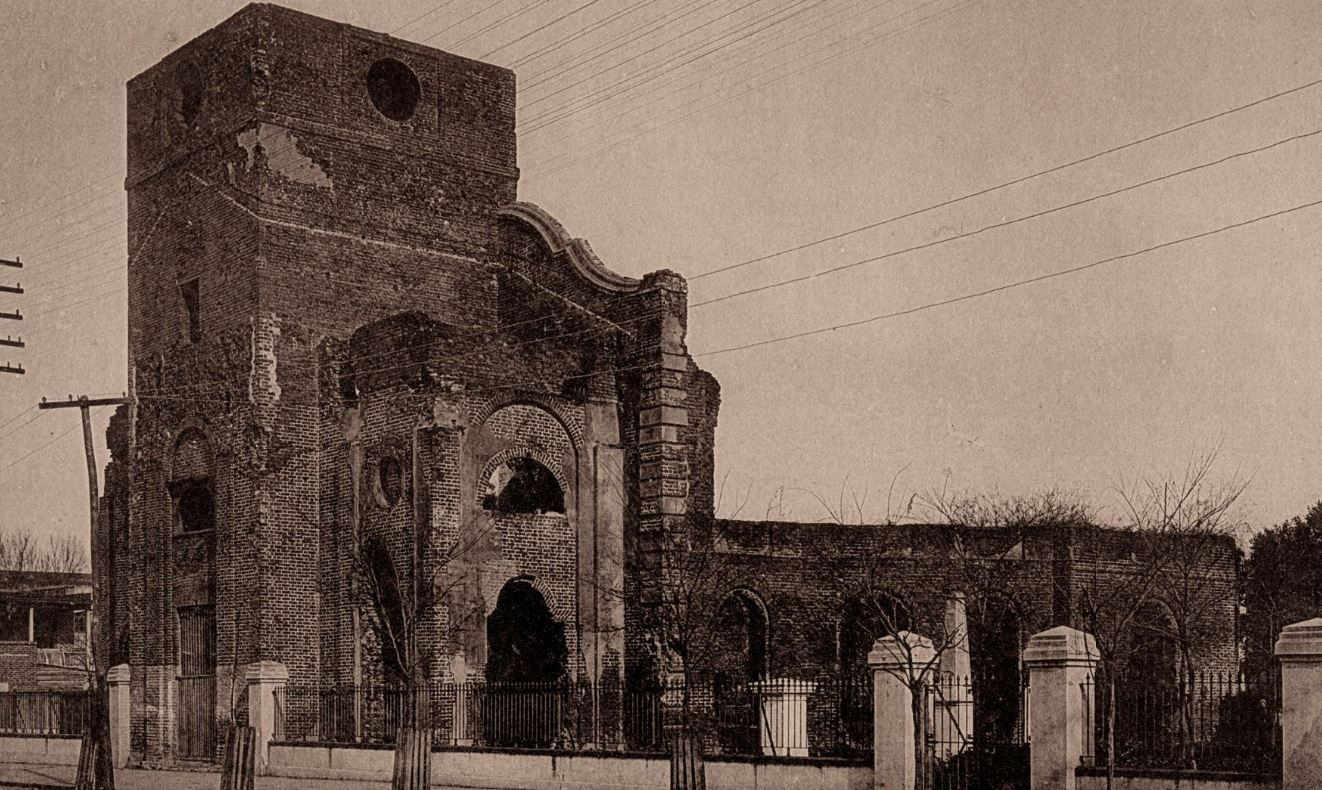
Circular Church (1883)

== See also ==
- List of National Historic Landmarks in South Carolina
- National Register of Historic Places listings in Charleston, South Carolina
