= Battle of the Combahee River =

1782 battle of the American Revolutionary War

- Part of the American Revolutionary War
Date	August 27, 1782
Location	Beaufort and Colleton Counties, outside Beaufort, South Carolina 32°34′57″N 80°34′24″W
Result	British victory

Belligerents
United States	Great Britain

Commanders and leaders
(United States) Mordecai Gist (United States) John Laurens †	(Kingdom of Great Britain) William Brereton

Strength
200 regulars	150 regulars

Casualties and losses
2 killed 19 wounded	Unknown

The Battle of the Combahee River took place during the American Revolutionary War on August 27, 1782, near Beaufort, South Carolina, one of many such confrontations after the Siege of Yorktown to occur before the British evacuated Charleston in December 1782. Lieutenant Colonel John Laurens, a 27-year-old Southern abolitionist, previously a diplomat and an aide-de-camp to George Washington, who was lauded as "one of the bravest and most gallant of the American officers," was killed during the confrontation.

== Background ==
British forces occupying Charleston had essentially been under siege since late 1781 due to the activity of General Nathanael Greene's forces in the area. British General Alexander Leslie requested a truce in March 1782 and permission to purchase food for his garrison and for the inhabitants of the city. When Greene refused, General Leslie announced his intention to resume his armed forays to seize provisions by force. To oppose the British forays, Greene placed a 300-man light brigade of infantry and cavalry under the command of General Mordecai Gist of Maryland.

On August 21, General Leslie sent out two foraging expeditions. One went out to St. Helena's Parish, and the other, under Major William Brereton, went up the Combahee River in search of rice to feed their garrison. When Greene learned of the British movements, he sent Gist's force to the Combahee to oppose Brereton.

Gist arrived at the north bank of the river on August 25, but Brereton had already arrived and taken control of the ferry. On August 26, Gist learned that 300 of Brereton's men had crossed the river, so he sent a detachment over with orders to attack the British before sunrise the next morning.

Colonel John Laurens, who had just arrived on August 26 from his station outside Charleston, requested that Gist give him orders to take an additional small force further downriver to man a redoubt at Chehaw Point, where they could fire on the British as they retreated. Gist placed fifty Delaware infantrymen and an artillery captain by the name of James Smith with a howitzer under Laurens' command.

== Battle ==
Laurens and his troops stopped for the night at a plantation house near the Combahee River, the home of a friend of Laurens. They left at about 3:00 am on August 27 to march toward Chehaw Point.

The British, in anticipation of Gist's maneuvers, had quietly drifted downriver. Before Laurens's detachment could reach the redoubt, 140 British soldiers had already prepared an ambush about one mile from Chehaw Point, concealing themselves in tall grass along the road.

When the enemy rose to fire, Laurens led an immediate charge, despite the British having superior numbers and the stronger position. While not all sources agree as to whether Laurens ordered his men to attack before leading the charge, the battle was engaged as Laurens led the charge himself. The British immediately opened fire, and in the first volley, Laurens fell from his horse with fatal wounds. The artillery captain also fell, as did others, and the American troops retreated in disarray, leaving the howitzer behind.

Gist, who had discovered the British departure at 4:00 am, was only two miles away and quickly approaching, leading 150 cavalry to reinforce Laurens. According to William McKennan, a captain under Laurens's command, Laurens appeared "anxious to attack the enemy previous to the main body coming up," gambling that his troops, "although few in numbers, [would be] sufficient to enable him to gain a laurel for his brow" before the end of the fighting. McKennan's opinion was that Laurens "wanted to do all himself, and have all the honor."

Gist arrived with the cavalry in time to cover a retreat, but he was unable to recover the howitzer or dislodge the British from their position.

== Aftermath of the battle ==
The British eventually returned to their boats, and Brereton's men continued to forage while Gist dealt with the aftermath of the battle. Laurens and one other American died on the field, and 19 more were wounded.
