= Robert Webb (disambiguation) =

Robert Webb (born 1972) is an English comedian, actor and writer.

Robert, Bob, or Bobby Webb may also refer to:

== Science and medicine ==
- Robert Rumsey Webb (1850–1936), English mathematician
- Robert Wallace Webb (1909–1984), American geologist
- Robert G. Webb (1927–2018), American herpetologist

== Sports ==
- Robert Webb (cricketer, born 1806) (1806–1880), English cricketer
- Robert Webb (Kent cricketer) (1840–?), English cricketer
- Robert Webb (rugby union) (1900–1970), English international rugby union player
- Bob Webb (cricketer) (1917–1989), New Zealand cricketer
- Bobby Webb (footballer) (born 1933), English footballer
- Bobby Webb (tennis) (born 1953), American tennis player

== Others ==
- Robert Webb (MP) (c. 1719–1765), English politician and merchant
- Robert Alexander Webb (1856–1919), American minister
- Robert D. Webb (1903–1990), American film maker
- Robert K. Webb (1922–2012), American historian
- Robert I. Webb, American professor of finance
- Robert Webb, member of the British prog rock band England
