= 2018 Wake Forest Demon Deacons football team =

American college football season

2018 Wake Forest Demon Deacons football

Birmingham Bowl champion

Birmingham Bowl, W 37–34 vs. Memphis
- Conference: Atlantic Coast Conference
- Atlantic Division
- Record: 7–6 (3–5 ACC)
- Head coach: Dave Clawson (5th season)
- Offensive coordinator: Warren Ruggiero (5th season)
- Offensive scheme: Slow mesh
- Defensive coordinator: Jay Sawvel (3rd season; first 4 games); Lyle Hemphill (interim; remainder of season)
- Base defense: 4–3
- Captains: Ryan Anderson; Phil Haynes; Cade Carney; Cameron Glenn; Chuck Wade Jr.; Willie Yarbury
- Home stadium: BB&T Field

2018 Atlantic Coast Conference football standings
	Conf.			Overall
Team	W		L	W		L
Atlantic Division
No. 1 Clemson x$#^	8	–	0	15	–	0
No. 15 Syracuse	6	–	2	10	–	3
NC State	5	–	3	9	–	4
Boston College	4	–	4	7	–	5
Wake Forest	3	–	5	7	–	6
Florida State	3	–	5	5	–	7
Louisville	0	–	8	2	–	10
Coastal Division
Pittsburgh x	6	–	2	7	–	7
Georgia Tech	5	–	3	7	–	6
Miami (FL)	4	–	4	7	–	6
Virginia	4	–	4	8	–	5
Virginia Tech	4	–	4	6	–	7
Duke	3	–	5	8	–	5
North Carolina	1	–	7	2	–	9
Championship: Clemson 42, Pittsburgh 10
# – College Football Playoff champion; ^ – College Football Playoff participant; $ – Conference champion; x – Division champion/co-champions; Rankings from AP Poll

The 2018 Wake Forest Demon Deacons football team represented Wake Forest University during the 2018 NCAA Division I FBS football season. The team was led by fifth-year head coach Dave Clawson, and played their home games at BB&T Field. Wake Forest competed in the Atlantic Division of the Atlantic Coast Conference as they have since the league's inception in 1953. They finished the season 7–6, 3–5 in ACC play to finish in a tie for fifth place in the Atlantic Division. They were invited to the Birmingham Bowl where they defeated Memphis.

== Recruits ==
College recruiting (2018)
Name	Hometown	School	Height	Weight	Commit date
Marquis Alston; CB	Kennesaw, GA	Harrison HS	5 ft 11 in (1.80 m)	181 lb (82 kg)	Feb 4, 2018
Marquis Alston; CB	Recruit ratings: Scout: Rivals: 247Sports: ESPN:				
Dion Bergen; DT	Kissimmee, FL	Osceola HS	6 ft 2 in (1.88 m)	265 lb (120 kg)	Dec 10, 2017
Dion Bergen; DT	Recruit ratings: Scout: Rivals: 247Sports: ESPN:				
Rondell Bothroyd; DE	Willington, CT	E.O. Smith HS	6 ft 3 in (1.91 m)	250 lb (110 kg)	Dec 20, 2017
Rondell Bothroyd; DE	Recruit ratings: Scout: Rivals: 247Sports: ESPN:				
Kelijiha Brown; DT	Saluda, SC	Saluda HS	6 ft 3 in (1.91 m)	305 lb (138 kg)	Mar 15, 2017
Kelijiha Brown; DT	Recruit ratings: Scout: Rivals: 247Sports: ESPN:				
Kenneth Dicks III; CB	Suwanee, GA	Lambert HS	6 ft 5 in (1.96 m)	250 lb (110 kg)	Jul 29, 2017
Kenneth Dicks III; CB	Recruit ratings: Scout: Rivals: 247Sports: ESPN:				
Mike Edwards; OT	Hope Mills, NC	South View HS	6 ft 6 in (1.98 m)	285 lb (129 kg)	Dec 20, 2017
Mike Edwards; OT	Recruit ratings: Scout: Rivals: 247Sports: ESPN:				
Royce Francis; DE	Acworth, GA	Allatoona HS	6 ft 3 in (1.91 m)	240 lb (110 kg)	Jun 8, 2017
Royce Francis; DE	Recruit ratings: Scout: Rivals: 247Sports: ESPN:				
Devonte Gordon; OT	Beeville, TX	Maret School	6 ft 5 in (1.96 m)	280 lb (130 kg)	Jul 23, 2017
Devonte Gordon; OT	Recruit ratings: Scout: Rivals: 247Sports: ESPN:				
Nasir Greer; S	Stockbridge, GA	Stockbridge HS	6 ft 1 in (1.85 m)	175 lb (79 kg)	Jun 23, 2017
Nasir Greer; S	Recruit ratings: Scout: Rivals: 247Sports: ESPN:				
Sam Hartman; QB	Mount Pleasant, SC	Oceanside Collegiate Academy	6 ft 1 in (1.85 m)	186 lb (84 kg)	Jul 7, 2016
Sam Hartman; QB	Recruit ratings: Scout: Rivals: 247Sports: ESPN:				
Orlando Heggs; OG	Jacksonville, FL	The Bolles School	6 ft 4 in (1.93 m)	305 lb (138 kg)	Dec 7, 2017
Orlando Heggs; OG	Recruit ratings: Scout: Rivals: 247Sports: ESPN:				
Isaiah Isaac; CB	Buford, GA	Buford HS	5 ft 9 in (1.75 m)	175 lb (79 kg)	Jun 1, 2017
Isaiah Isaac; CB	Recruit ratings: Scout: Rivals: 247Sports: ESPN:				
JaCorey Johns; ILB	Cartersville, GA	Cartersville HS	6 ft 4 in (1.93 m)	221 lb (100 kg)	Oct 25, 2017
JaCorey Johns; ILB	Recruit ratings: Scout: Rivals: 247Sports: ESPN:				
Michael Jurgens; OG	Damascus, MD	Damascus HS	6 ft 4 in (1.93 m)	272 lb (123 kg)	Jun 8, 2017
Michael Jurgens; OG	Recruit ratings: Scout: Rivals: 247Sports: ESPN:				
Zion Keith; WR	Florence, SC	Wilson HS	6 ft 1 in (1.85 m)	190 lb (86 kg)	Mar 2, 2017
Zion Keith; WR	Recruit ratings: Scout: Rivals: 247Sports: ESPN:				
Anthony Manning; WR	Orlando, FL	Lake Nona HS	5 ft 10 in (1.78 m)	175 lb (79 kg)	Dec 10, 2017
Anthony Manning; WR	Recruit ratings: Scout: Rivals: 247Sports: ESPN:				
Courtney McKinney; LB	Biscoe, NC	East Montgomery HS	6 ft 2 in (1.88 m)	200 lb (91 kg)	Dec 5, 2017
Courtney McKinney; LB	Recruit ratings: Scout: Rivals: 247Sports: ESPN:				
A. T. Perry; WR	Lake Worth, FL	Park Vista Community HS	6 ft 5 in (1.96 m)	180 lb (82 kg)	Dec 4, 2017
A. T. Perry; WR	Recruit ratings: Scout: Rivals: 247Sports: ESPN:				
Nick Sciba; K	Clover, SC	Clover HS	5 ft 9 in (1.75 m)	160 lb (73 kg)	Jun 27, 2017
Nick Sciba; K	Recruit ratings: Scout: Rivals: 247Sports: ESPN:				
Ryan Smenda; ILB	Orange Park, FL	Fleming Island HS	6 ft 3 in (1.91 m)	210 lb (95 kg)	Jun 12, 2017
Ryan Smenda; ILB	Recruit ratings: Scout: Rivals: 247Sports: ESPN:				
Blake Whiteheart; TE	Winston-Salem, NC	Mount Tabor HS	6 ft 1 in (1.85 m)	280 lb (130 kg)	Mar 22, 2017
Blake Whiteheart; TE	Recruit ratings: Scout: Rivals: 247Sports: ESPN:				
Peyton Woulard; DT	Suwanee, GA	Collins Hill HS	6 ft 1 in (1.85 m)	175 lb (79 kg)	Apr 9, 2017
Peyton Woulard; DT	Recruit ratings: Scout: Rivals: 247Sports: ESPN:				
Overall recruit ranking: Scout: 63 Rivals: 60 247Sports: 63 ESPN: 60
Note: In many cases, Scout, Rivals, 247Sports, On3, and ESPN may conflict in their listings of height and weight.; In these cases, the average was taken. ESPN grades are on a 100-point scale.; Sources: "2018 Wake Forest Football Commitments". Rivals.; "2018 Player Commitments – Wake Forest". ESPN.; "2018 Team Ranking". Rivals.com.

== Preseason ==
=== Award watch lists ===
Listed in the order that they were released.

Award	Player	Position	Year
Rimington Trophy	Ryan Anderson	C	SR
Doak Walker Award	Matt Colburn	RB	SR
Fred Biletnikoff Award	Greg Dortch	WR	SO
Outland Trophy	Ryan Anderson	C	SR
Outland Trophy	Phil Haynes	G	SR
Paul Hornung Award	Greg Dortch	WR/KR	SO

=== ACC media poll ===
The ACC media poll was released on July 24, 2018.

Media poll (Atlantic)
Predicted finish	Team	Votes (1st place)
1	Clemson	1,031 (145)
2	Florida State	789 (1)
3	NC State	712 (2)
4	Boston College	545
5	Louisville	422
6	Wake Forest	413
7	Syracuse	232

== Schedule ==
Wake Forest announced their schedule for the 2018 season on January 17, 2018. The Demon Deacons' schedule consisted of 7 home games and 5 away games. Wake Forest hosted conference opponents Boston College, Clemson, Pittsburgh, and Syracuse, and traveled to Duke, Florida State, Louisville, and NC State. The Demon Deacons played out of conference games against Tulane of the AAC, Towson of the Division I FCS CAA, Notre Dame who competes as an Independent, and Rice of C-USA.

Date	Time	Opponent	Site	TV	Result	Attendance
August 30	8:00 p.m.	at Tulane*	Yulman Stadium; New Orleans, LA	CBSSN	W 23–17 ^{OT}	15,478
September 8	12:00 p.m.	Towson*	BB&T Field; Winston-Salem, NC	ACCN Extra	W 51–20	23,619
September 13	5:30 p.m. (Note: The Boston College game was originally scheduled for 7:30 p.m., but the game was moved up to 5:30 p.m. in anticipation of Hurricane Florence.)	Boston College	BB&T Field; Winston-Salem, NC	ESPN	L 34–41	25,309
September 22	12:00 p.m.	No. 8 Notre Dame*	BB&T Field; Winston-Salem, NC	ABC	L 27–56	31,092
September 29	3:30 p.m.	Rice*	BB&T Field; Winston-Salem, NC	ACCRSN	W 56–24	24,519
October 6	3:30 p.m.	No. 4 Clemson	BB&T Field; Winston-Salem, NC	ESPN	L 3–63	31,068
October 20	3:30 p.m.	at Florida State	Doak Campbell Stadium; Tallahassee, FL	ESPN2	L 17–38	67,274
October 27	12:00 p.m.	at Louisville	Cardinal Stadium; Louisville, KY	ACCRSN	W 56–35	49,603
November 3	12:00 p.m.	No. 22 Syracuse^{†}	BB&T Field; Winston-Salem, NC	ACCRSN	L 24–41	26,136
November 8	7:30 p.m.	at No. 22 NC State	Carter–Finley Stadium; Raleigh, NC (rivalry)	ESPN	W 27–23	56,228
November 17	12:00 p.m.	Pittsburgh	BB&T Field; Winston-Salem, NC	ACCRSN	L 13–34	25,609
November 24	12:30 p.m.	at Duke	Wallace Wade Stadium; Durham, NC (rivalry)	ACCRSN	W 59–7	20,782
December 22	12:00 p.m.	vs. Memphis*	Legion Field; Birmingham, AL (Birmingham Bowl)	ESPN	W 37–34	25,717
*Non-conference game; ^{†}Homecoming; Rankings from AP Poll released prior to the game; All times are in Eastern time

== Coaching staff ==
Position	Name	First Year at Wake
Head coach	Dave Clawson	2014
Offensive coordinator / quarterbacks	Warren Ruggiero	2014
Asst head coach / Receivers	Kevin Higgins	2014
Defensive coordinator / Cornerbacks	Jay Sawvel	2017
Special teams coordinator / tight ends	Wayne Lineburg	2017
Defensive Line	Dave Cohen	2014
Running backs	John Hunter	2014
Offensive Line	Nick Tabacca	2014
Safeties	Lyle Hemphill	2017
Outside linebackers	Brad Sherrod	2017

== Roster ==
2018 Wake Forest Demon Deacons football team roster
Quarterbacks: 2 Kendall Hinton – junior (6'0, 195) (redshirt); 10 Sam Hartman – freshman (6'1, 190); 12 Jamie Newman – sophomore (6'4, 230) (redshirt); 13 Tayvone Bowers – freshman (6'1, 205) (redshirt); 18 Matthew Considine – freshman (6'6, 210) (redshirt); Running backs: 22 Matt Colburn II – senior (5'10, 200); 26 Christian Beal–Smith – freshman (5'10, 190) (redshirt); 27 Trey Ndlovu – freshman (5'10, 190) (redshirt); 28 Courtney McKinney – freshman (6'1, 205); 29 DeAndre Delaney – sophomore (6'3, 200) (redshirt); 34 Will Drawdy – freshman (6'0, 190) (redshirt); 36 Cade Carney – junior (5'11, 215); 42 Joey Ray – freshman (5'9, 190); Wide receivers: 1 Alex Bachman – senior (6'0, 190); 3 Greg Dortch – sophomore (5'9, 170) (redshirt); 7 Scotty Washington – junior (6'5, 220) (redshirt); 11 Davis Johnson – sophomore (5'11, 180) (redshirt); 14 Sage Surratt – freshman (6'3, 210) (redshirt); 21 Isaiah Isaac – freshman (5'10, 175); 25 James Sriraman – junior (6'3, 195) (redshirt); 29 Anthony Manning – freshman (6'10, 175); 35 Willy Bemiss – freshman (5'11, 180); 80 Waydale Jones – freshman (6'4, 185) (redshirt); 81 Ian Driscoll – freshman (5'10, 175); 82 Jaquarii Roberson – freshman (6'1, 165); 83 Davis Johnson – freshman (5'11, 180) (redshirt); 88 Steven Claude – sophomore (6'2, 195) (redshirt); 89 A. T. Perry – freshman (6'5, 190); Tight ends: 23 Brandon Chapman – freshman (6'5, 250) (redshirt); 49 Alec Rowan – freshman (6'3, 210); 84 Jaren Lubrano – freshman (6'1, 205) (redshirt); 85 Blake Whiteheart – freshman (6'4, 245); 86 Jack Freudenthal – junior (6'3, 240) (redshirt); Punters: 8 Dom Maggio – sophomore (6'3, 185)	Offensive lineman: 55 Michael Jurgens – freshman (6'4, 280); 56 Spencer Clapp – freshman (6'6, 280) (redshirt); 58 Tyler Watson – sophomore (6'5, 295) (redshirt); 59 Loic Ngassam Nya – freshman (6'3, 290) (redshirt); 60 Taleni Suhren – sophomore (6'5, 285) (redshirt); 63 Je'Vionte' Nash – sophomore (6'3, 285) (redshirt); 65 Zach Tom – freshman (6'4, 280) (redshirt); 66 Goran Jovanovic – freshman (6'4, 280) (redshirt); 68 Patrick Osterhage – senior (6'4, 285) (redshirt); 70 Ryan Anderson – senior (6'6, 305) (redshirt); 71 Nathan Gilliam – junior (6'5, 290) (redshirt); 73 Jake Benzinger – junior (6'7, 295) (redshirt); 74 Phil Haynes – senior (6'4, 310) (redshirt); 75 Justin Herron – senior (6'5, 290) (redshirt); 76 Allan Rappleyea – freshman (6'5, 285) (redshirt); 77 Mike Edwards – freshman (6'6, 370); 78 Orlando Heggs II – freshman (6'3, 305); 79 Sean Maginn – freshman (6'3, 280); Defensive lineman: 6 Chris Calhoun – junior (6'4, 250); 18 Carlos Basham Jr. – sophomore (6'5, 270) (redshirt); 40 Rondell Bothroyd – freshman (6'4, 270); 44 LaRonde' Liverpool – sophomore (6'3, 280) (redshirt); 48 Willie Yarbary – senior (6'2, 285) (redshirt); 53 Dion Bergan – freshman (6'1, 280); 54 Elontae Bateman – junior (6'2, 285) (redshirt); 67 Trey Turner – freshman (6'3, 270); 72 Tyler Williams – freshman (6'1, 300) (redshirt); 90 Sulaiman Kamara – sophomore (6'2, 290) (redshirt); 91 Mike Allen – freshman (6'5, 270) (redshirt); 92 Adam Winter – freshman (6'3, 260) (redshirt); 93 Zeek Rodney – senior (6'1, 300) (redshirt); 94 Manny Walker – sophomore (6'4, 245) (redshirt); 95 Connor Hebbeler – freshman (6'2, 250) (redshirt); 96 Tyric Swennie – freshman (6'0, 245); 97 Royce Francis – freshman (6'3, 240); Placekickers: 8 Dom Maggio – junior (6'3, 185); 11 Darren Ford – graduate (6'2, 200); 48 Eric Osteen – graduate (6'2, 190); 88 Zach Murphy – freshman (6'0, 180) (redshirt); 96 Nick Sciba – freshman (5'9, 185); 97 Ben Brown – junior (6'2, 175) (redshirt); 98 Cameron Lischke – freshman (6'0, 180)	Linebackers: 15 Jake Simpson – sophomore (6'0, 220); 23 Justin Strnad – junior (6'3, 230) (redshirt); 30 Ja'Cquez Williams – sophomore (6'2, 210) (redshirt); 32 Jeff Burley – freshman (6'2, 230) (redshirt); 34 Demetrius Kemp – senior (6'1, 230) (redshirt); 35 Nate Mays – junior (6'1, 230) (redshirt); 41 JaCorey Johns – freshman (6'4, 230); 45 Ryan Smenda Jr. – freshman (6'2, 230); 46 DJ Taylor – sophomore (6'1, 235); 49 Vincent Notzon – freshman (6'1, 200); 50 Grant Dawson – senior (6'1, 225) (redshirt); 57 Jake Galli – freshman (6'0, 215); 58 Chase Monroe – freshman (6'2, 225) (redshirt); Defensive backs: 2 Cam Glenn – senior (6'1, 205) (redshirt); 4 Amari Henderson – sophomore (6'1, 185) (redshirt); 5 Arkeem Byrd – sophomore (6'1, 190) (redshirt); 9 Chuck Wade Jr. – senior (6'0, 205); 10 Kenneth Dicks III – freshman (6'0, 195); 12 Luke Masterson – sophomore (6'2, 210) (redshirt); 13 Malik Grate – sophomore (6'0, 180) (redshirt); 17 Traveon Redd – sophomore (6'0, 200) (redshirt); 20 Coby Davis – sophomore (5'11, 200); 21 Essang Bassey – junior (5'10, 190); 24 Ja'Sir Taylor – sophomore (5'10, 190); 25 Marquis Alston Jr. – freshman (6'0, 190); 26 Justin Bartee – freshman (5'10, 205) (redshirt); 27 Tyriq Hardimon – freshman (6'0, 195) (redshirt); 28 Zion Keith – freshman (6'1, 200); 37 Nasir Greer – freshman (6'0, 200); 38 Peyton Woulard – freshman (6'1, 180); 39 Keegan Good – sophomore (6'0, 190) (redshirt); Long snappers: 52 Dayton Diemel – junior (5'10, 215); 61 Noah Turner – freshman (6'0, 240)

== Game summaries ==
=== At Tulane ===
Week One: Wake Forest Demon Deacons at Tulane Green Wave – Game summary

Quarter	1	2	3	4	OT	Total
Demon Deacons	0	7	3	7	6	23
Green Wave	0	0	14	3	0	17

at Yulman Stadium • New Orleans, LA

- Date: August 30
- Game time: 8:00 p.m. ET (7:00 p.m. local)
- Game weather: 78 °F (26 °C) • W 5 mph (8.0 km/h) • Cloudy
- Game attendance: 15,478
- Referee: Mike Roche
- TV announcers (CBSSN): Play-by-Play: Ben Holden • Color Analyst: Jay Feely

Game information

Second Quarter

- 6:45 WAKE – Alex Bachman 10-yard pass from Sam Hartman (Nick Sciba kick), Demon Deacons 7–0. Drive: 14 plays, 80 yards, TOP 4:02

Third Quarter

- 10:58 TUL – Terren Encalade 52-yard pass from Jonathan Banks (Merek Glover kick), Tied 7–7. Drive: 8 plays, 75 yards, TOP 4:02
- 7:29 WAKE – Nick Sciba 34-yard field goal, Demon Deacons 10–7. Drive: 11 plays, 59 yards, TOP 3:29
- 1:42 TUL – Terren Encalade 74-yard pass from Jonathan Banks (Merek Glover kick), Green Wave 14–10. Drive: 3 plays, 88 yards, TOP 1:19

Fourth Quarter

- 14:35 WAKE – Alex Bachman 19-yard pass from Sam Hartman (Nick Sciba kick), Demon Deacons 17–14. Drive: 9 plays, 75 yards, TOP 1:59
- 3:27 TUL – Merek Glover 39-yard field goal, Tied 17–17. Drive: 13 plays, 61 yards, TOP 5:52

Overtime

- 0:00 WAKE – Cade Carney 1-yard run, Demon Deacons 23–17. Drive: 7 plays, 25 yards, TOP 0:00

Top Passers

- WAKE – Sam Hartman, 31/51, 378 yards, 2 touchdowns, 2 interceptions
- TUL – Jonathan Banks, 18/37, 281 yards, 2 touchdowns

Top Rushers

- WAKE – Cade Carney, 16 carries, 54 yards, 1 touchdown
- TUL – Jonathan Banks, 15 carries, 38 yards

Top Receiving

- WAKE – Greg Dortch, 12 receptions, 149 yards
- TUL – Terren Encalade, 8 receptions, 189 yards, 2 touchdowns

Leading Tacklers

- WAKE – Chris Calhoun, 12 tackles
- TUL – P. J. Hall, 11 tackles

Player of the Week

- Sage Surratt (ACC Rookie of the Week)

=== Towson ===
Week Two: Towson Tigers at Wake Forest Demon Deacons – Game summary

Quarter	1	2	3	4	Total
Tigers	14	6	0	0	20
Demon Deacons	14	24	3	10	51

at BB&T Field • Winston-Salem, NC

- Date: September 8
- Game time: 12:00 p.m. ET
- Game weather: 82 °F (28 °C) • ESE 5 mph (8.0 km/h) • Overcast
- Game attendance: 23,619
- Referee: Jeff Heaser
- TV announcers (ACCN Extra): Play-by-Play: Shawn Kenney • Color Analyst: Stan Lewter

Game information

First Quarter

- 11:39 WAKE – Alex Bachman 10-yard pass from Sam Hartman (Nick Sciba kick), Demon Deacons 7–0. Drive: 13 plays, 74 yards, TOP 3:21
- 8:12 TOW – Sam Gallahan 24-yard pass from Tom Flacco (Aidan O'Neill kick), Tied 7–7. Drive: 8 plays, 68 yards, TOP 3:27
- 7:11 WAKE – Greg Dortch 7-yard pass from Sam Hartman (Nick Sciba kick), Demon Deacons 14–7. Drive: 3 plays, 62 yards, TOP 1:01
- 1:32 TOW – Shane Simpson 8-yard pass from Tom Flacco (Aidan O'Neill kick), Tied 14–14. Drive: 5 plays, 23 yards, TOP 1:25

Second Quarter

- 14:19 WAKE – Sam Hartman 14-yard run (Nick Sciba kick), Demon Deacons 21–14. Drive: 7 plays, 73 yards, TOP 2:13
- 11:37 WAKE – Nick Sciba 35-yard field goal, Demon Deacons 24–14. Drive: 10 plays, 54 yards, TOP 2:35
- 9:49 WAKE – Greg Dortch 70-yard punt return (Nick Sciba kick), Demon Deacons 31–14. Drive: 4 plays, 4 yards, TOP 1:48
- 2:02 WAKE – Greg Dortch 60-yard punt return (Nick Sciba kick), Demon Deacons 38–14. Drive: 3 plays, 7 yards, TOP 1:23
- 0:42 TOW – Shane Leatherbury 18-yard pass from Tom Flacco (two-point pass conv. failed), Demon Deacons 38–20. Drive: 9 plays, 80 yards, TOP 1:20

Third Quarter

- 3:53 WAKE – Nick Sciba 27-yard field goal, Demon Deacons 41–20. Drive: 9 plays, 48 yards, TOP 2:22

Fourth Quarter

- 14:03 WAKE – Cade Carney 1-yard run (Nick Sciba kick), Demon Deacons 48–20. Drive: 11 plays, 91 yards, TOP 3:07
- 9:04 WAKE – Nick Sciba 27-yard field goal, Demon Deacons 51–20. Drive: 7 plays, 68 yards, TOP 3:39

Top Passers

- TOW – Tom Flacco, 35/51, 345 yards, 3 touchdowns, 1 interception
- WAKE – Sam Hartman, 17/27, 242 yards, 2 touchdowns, 1 interception

Top Rushers

- TOW – Shane Simpson, 8 carries, 18 yards
- WAKE – Cade Carney, 19 carries, 130 yards, 1 touchdown

Top Receiving

- TOW – Shane Leatherbury, 8 receptions, 88 yards, 1 touchdown
- WAKE – Greg Dortch, 7 receptions, 94 yards, 1 touchdown

Leading Tacklers

- TOW – Diondre Wallace, 16 tackles
- WAKE – Nate Mays, 8 tackles

Player of the Week

- Greg Dortch (ACC Specialist of the Week)

=== Boston College ===
Week Three: Boston College Eagles at Wake Forest Demon Deacons – Game summary

Quarter	1	2	3	4	Total
Eagles	7	14	7	13	41
Demon Deacons	7	14	3	10	34

at BB&T Field • Winston-Salem, NC

- Date: September 13
- Game time: 5:30 p.m. ET
- Game weather: 81 °F (27 °C) • NE 13 mph (21 km/h) • Mostly cloudy
- Game attendance: 25,309
- Referee: Stuart Mullins
- TV announcers (ESPN): Play-by-Play: Dave Flemming • Color Analyst: Dan Orlovsky • Sideline: Laura Rutledge

Game information

First Quarter

- 13:53 BC – A. J. Dillon 45-yard run (John Tessitore kick), Eagles 7–0. Drive: 3 plays, 52 yards, TOP 1:07
- 4:24 WAKE – Matt Colburn 2-yard run (Nick Sciba kick), Tied 7–7. Drive: 3 plays, 13 yards, TOP 0:35

Second Quarter

- 12:11 BC – Jeff Smith 27-yard pass from Anthony Brown (John Tessitore kick), Eagles 14–7. Drive: 4 plays, 56 yards, TOP 1:22
- 8:56 WAKE – Malik Grate 0-yard return of Blocked Punt (Nick Sciba kick), Tied 14–14. Drive: 3 plays, 7 yards, TOP 1:55
- 4:14 WAKE – Sage Surratt 5-yard pass from Sam Hartman (Nick Sciba kick), Demon Deacons 21–14. Drive: 10 plays, 81 yards, TOP 2:36
- 3:01 BC – Kobay White 35-yard pass from Anthony Brown (John Tessitore kick), Tied 21–21. Drive: 3 plays, 78 yards, TOP 1:13

Third Quarter

- 12:11 WAKE – Nick Sciba 27-yard field goal, Demon Deacons 24–21. Drive: 8 plays, 75 yards, TOP 2:49
- 8:39 BC – Tommy Sweeney 29-yard pass from Anthony Brown (John Tessitore kick), Eagles 28–24. Drive: 8 plays, 78 yards, TOP 3:32

Fourth Quarter

- 13:29 BC – Jeff Smith 71-yard pass from Anthony Brown (John Tessitore kick blocked), Eagles 34–24. Drive: 5 plays, 92 yards, TOP 2:11
- 11:13 WAKE – Nick Sciba 23-yard field goal, Eagles 34–27. Drive: 11 plays, 69 yards, TOP 2:16
- 8:48 BC – Ben Glines 40-yard pass from Anthony Brown (John Tessitore kick), Eagles 41–27. Drive: 6 plays, 75 yards, TOP 2:25
- 1:33 WAKE – Jack Freudenthal 5-yard pass from Sam Hartman (Nick Sciba kick), Eagles 41–34. Drive: 14 plays, 52 yards, TOP 3:09

Top Passers

- BC – Anthony Brown, 16/25, 304 yards, 5 touchdowns
- WAKE – Sam Hartman, 20/45, 214 yards, 2 touchdowns, 2 interceptions

Top Rushers

- BC – A. J. Dillon, 33 carries, 185 yards, 1 touchdown
- WAKE – Matt Colburn, 23 carries, 117 yards, 1 touchdown

Top Receiving

- BC – Jeff Smith, 6 receptions, 145 yards, 2 touchdowns
- WAKE – Greg Dortch, 9 receptions, 93 yards

Leading Tacklers

- BC – Connor Strachan, 15 tackles
- WAKE – Cam Glenn, 10 tackles

=== Notre Dame ===
Week Four: Notre Dame Fighting Irish at Wake Forest Demon Deacons – Game summary

Quarter	1	2	3	4	Total
No. 8 Fighting Irish	7	21	21	7	56
Demon Deacons	3	10	7	7	27

at BB&T Field • Winston-Salem, NC

- Date: September 22
- Game time: 12:00 p.m. ET
- Game weather: 83 °F (28 °C) • ENE 1 mph (1.6 km/h) • Clear
- Game attendance: 31,092
- Referee: Duane Heydt
- TV announcers (ABC): Play-by-Play: Sean McDonough • Color Analyst: Todd Blackledge • Sideline: Holly Rowe

Game information

First Quarter

- 5:18 WAKE – Nick Sciba 30-yard field goal, Demon Deacons 3–0. Drive: 4 plays, 1 yard, TOP 0:42
- 3:06 ND – Jafar Armstrong 30-yard run (Justin Yoon kick), Fighting Irish 7–3. Drive: 6 plays, 75 yards, TOP 2:12

Second Quarter

- 14:56 WAKE – Nick Sciba 39-yard field goal, Fighting Irish 7–6. Drive: 12 plays, 54 yards, TOP 3:10
- 11:25 ND – Brock Wright 3-yard pass from Ian Book (Justin Yoon kick), Fighting Irish 14–6. Drive: 10 plays, 80 yards, TOP 3:31
- 9:19 ND – Tony Jones Jr. 4-yard run (Justin Yoon Kick), Fighting Irish 21–6. Drive: 2 plays, 4 yards, TOP 0:10
- 6:26 WAKE – Matt Colburn 2-yard run (Nick Sciba kick), Fighting Irish 21–13. Drive: 10 plays, 75 yards, TOP 2:53
- 5:24 ND – Ian Book 2-yard run (Justin Yoon kick), Fighting Irish 28–13. Drive: 4 plays, 75 yards, TOP 1:02

Third Quarter

- 9:46 ND – Chase Claypool 7-yard pass from Ian Book (Justin Yoon kick), Fighting Irish 35–13. Drive: 9 plays, 74 yards, TOP 3:18
- 5:15 ND – Jafar Armstrong 1-yard run (Justin Yoon kick), Fighting Irish 42–13. Drive: 7 plays, 71 yards, TOP 2:25
- 4:18 ND – Ian Book 2-yard run (Justin Yoon kick), Fighting Irish 49–13. Drive: 3 plays, 47 yards, TOP 0:47
- 0:44 WAKE – Kendall Hinton 23-yard run (Nick Sciba kick), Fighting Irish 49–20. Drive: 9 plays, 75 yards, TOP 3:34

Fourth Quarter

- 11:27 ND – Ian Book 1-yard run (Justin Yoon kick), Fighting Irish 56–20. Drive: 11 plays, 75 yards, TOP 4:17
- 4:53 WAKE – Jamie Newman 15-yard run (Nick Sciba kick), Fighting Irish 56–27. Drive: 13 plays, 79 yards, TOP 6:34

Top Passers

- ND – Ian Book, 25/34, 325 yards, 2 touchdowns
- WAKE – Sam Hartman, 12/24, 110 yards

Top Rushers

- ND – Jafar Armstrong, 8 carries, 98 yards, 2 touchdowns
- WAKE – Cade Carney, 13 carries, 79 yards

Top Receiving

- ND – Michael Young Jr., 1 reception, 66 yards
- WAKE – Greg Dortch, 6 receptions, 56 yards

Leading Tacklers

- ND – Alohi Gilman, 9 tackles
- WAKE – Chuck Wade Jr., 8 tackles

=== Rice ===
Week Five: Rice Owls at Wake Forest Demon Deacons – Game summary

Quarter	1	2	3	4	Total
Owls	0	3	14	7	24
Demon Deacons	21	21	14	0	56

at BB&T Field • Winston-Salem, NC

- Date: September 29
- Game time: 3:30 p.m. ET
- Game weather: 78 °F (26 °C) • ENE 8 mph (13 km/h) • Partly cloudy
- Game attendance: 24,519
- Referee: Tra Blake
- TV announcers (ACCRSN): Play-by-Play: Evan Lepler • Color Analyst: Takeo Spikes • Sideline: Lyndsay Rowley

Game information

First Quarter

- 10:37 WAKE – Greg Dortch 5-yard pass from Sam Hartman (Nick Sciba kick), Demon Deacons 7–0. Drive: 3 plays, 64 yards, TOP 0:41
- 6:58 WAKE – Cade Carney 1-yard run, Demon Deacons 14–0. Drive: 7 plays, 55 yards, TOP 2:03
- 10:37 WAKE – Greg Dortch 10-yard pass from Sam Hartman (Nick Sciba kick), Demon Deacons 21–0. Drive: 7 plays, 61 yards, TOP 2:24

Second Quarter

- 13:33 WAKE – Cade Carney 1-yard run, Demon Deacons 28–0. Drive: 7 plays, 18 yards, TOP 1:40
- 10:17 RICE – Jack Fox 39-yard field goal, Demon Deacons 28–3. Drive: 8 plays, 39 yards, TOP 3:16
- 8:10 WAKE – Greg Dortch 38-yard pass from Sam Hartman (Nick Sciba kick), Demon Deacons 35–3. Drive: 7 plays, 76 yards, TOP 2:07
- 5:25 WAKE – Essang Bassey 51-yard fumble return (Nick Sciba kick), Demon Deacons 42–3. Drive: 5 plays, 26 yards, TOP 2:45

Third Quarter

- 10:08 RICE – Austin Walter 38-yard pass from Shawn Stankavage (Jack Fox kick), Demon Deacons 42–10. Drive: 3 plays, 72 yards, TOP 1:23
- 8:58 WAKE – Greg Dortch 4-yard pass from Sam Hartman (Nick Sciba kick), Demon Deacons 49–10. Drive: 4 plays, 75 yards, TOP 1:10
- 8:13 WAKE – Essang Bassey 60-yard interecption return (Nick Sciba kick), Demon Deacons 56–10. Drive: 2 plays, 30 yards, TOP 0:45
- 7:55 RICE – Austin Walter 38-yard run, Demon Deacons 56–17. Drive: 1 play, 38 yards, TOP 0:18

Fourth Quarter

- 14:50 RICE – Aaron Cephus 3-yard pass from Shawn Stankavage (Jack Fox kick), Demon Deacons 56–24. Drive: 13 plays, 62 yards, TOP 5:38

Top Passers

- RICE – Shawn Stankavage, 17/32, 103 yards, 2 touchdowns, 2 interceptions
- WAKE – Sam Hartman, 15/17, 241 yards, 4 touchdowns

Top Rushers

- RICE – Austin Walter, 18 carries, 165 yards, 1 touchdown
- WAKE – Christian Beal-Smith, 9 carries, 60 yards

Top Receiving

- RICE – Austin Walter, 5 receptions, 32 yards, 1 touchdown
- WAKE – Greg Dortch, 11 receptions, 163 yards, 4 touchdowns

Leading Tacklers

- RICE – Dylan Silcox, 6 tackles
- WAKE – Luke Masterson, 8 tackles

Players of the Week

- Greg Dortch (ACC Receiver of the Week)
- Sam Hartman (ACC Rookie of the Week)

=== Clemson ===
Week Six: Clemson Tigers at Wake Forest Demon Deacons – Game summary

Quarter	1	2	3	4	Total
No. 4 Tigers	7	21	21	14	63
Demon Deacons	0	0	3	0	3

at BB&T Field • Winston-Salem, NC

- Date: October 6
- Game time: 3:30 p.m. ET
- Game weather: 79 °F (26 °C) • ESE 5 mph (8.0 km/h) • Partly cloudy
- Game attendance: 31,608
- Referee: Jerry Magallenes
- TV announcers (ESPN): Play-by-Play: Beth Mowins • Color Analyst: Anthony Becht • Sideline: Rocky Boiman

Game information

First Quarter

- 6:25 CLEM – Travis Etienne 59-yard run (Greg Huegel kick), Tigers 7–0. Drive: 1 play, 59 yards, TOP 0:09

Second Quarter

- 13:16 CLEM – Travis Etienne 3-yard run (Greg Huegel kick), Tigers 14–0. Drive: 8 plays, 62 yards, TOP 3:09
- 9:53 CLEM – Justyn Ross 55-yard pass from Trevor Lawrence (Greg Huegel kick), Tigers 21–0. Drive: 5 plays, 75 yards, TOP 2:16
- 0:30 CLEM – Tee Higgins 20-yard pass from Trevor Lawrence (Greg Huegel kick), Tigers 28–0. Drive: 10 plays, 81 yards, TOP 2:57

Third Quarter

- 13:45 CLEM – Travis Etienne 70-yard run (Greg Huegel kick), Tigers 35–0. Drive: 1 play, 70 yards, TOP 0:10
- 8:22 WAKE – Nick Sciba 25-yard field goal, Tigers 35–3. Drive: 7 plays, 72 yards, TOP 2:14
- 4:41 CLEM – Adam Choice 64-yard run (Greg Huegel kick), Tigers 42–3. Drive: 3 plays, 78 yards, TOP 0:59
- 2:21 CLEM – Lyn-J Dixon 65-yard run (Greg Huegel kick), Tigers 49–3. Drive: 1 play, 65 yards, TOP 0:10

Fourth Quarter

- 10:08 CLEM – Diondre Overton 2-yard pass from Chase Brice (B.T. Potter kick), Tigers 56–3. Drive: 8 plays, 79 yards, TOP 3:54
- 0:48 CLEM – Lyn-J Dixon 52-yard run (B.T. Potter kick), Tigers 63–3. Drive: 3 plays, 57 yards, TOP 0:59

Top Passers

- CLEM – Trevor Lawrence, 20/25, 175 yards, 2 touchdowns
- WAKE – Sam Hartman, 7/20, 74 yards, 1 interception

Top Rushers

- CLEM – Travis Etienne, 10 carries, 167 yards, 3 touchdowns
- WAKE – Kendall Hinton, 11 carries, 92 yards

Top Receiving

- CLEM – Justyn Ross, 5 receptions, 74 yards, 1 touchdown
- WAKE – Greg Dortch, 3 receptions, 37 yards

Leading Tacklers

- CLEM – Tre Lamar, 8 tackles, 2 sacks/tackle-for-loss
- WAKE – Luke Masterson, 8 tackles

=== At Florida State ===
Week Eight: Wake Forest Demon Deacons at Florida State Seminoles – Game summary

Quarter	1	2	3	4	Total
Demon Deacons	10	0	0	7	17
Seminoles	7	14	10	7	38

at Doak Campbell Stadium • Tallahassee, FL

- Date: October 20
- Game time: 3:30 p.m. ET
- Game weather: 88 °F (31 °C) • WSW 6 mph (9.7 km/h) • Cloudy; 20% rain
- Game attendance: 67,274
- Referee: Gary Patterson
- TV announcers (ESPN2): Play-by-Play: Clay Matvick • Color Analyst: Dan Orlovsky • Sideline: Paul Carcaterra

Game information

First Quarter

- 11:54 WAKE – Nick Sciba 32-yard field goal, Demon Deacons 3–0. Drive: 15 plays, 61 yards, TOP 3:06
- 6:00 WAKE – Jack Freudenthal 9-yard pass from Sam Hartman (Nick Sciba kick), Demon Deacons 10–0. Drive: 9 plays, 51 yards, TOP 2:04
- 0:24 FSU – Cam Akers 3-yard run (Ricky Aguayo kick), Demon Deacons 10–7. Drive: 6 plays, 60 yards, TOP 1:40

Second Quarter

- 9:50 FSU – Jacques Patrick 2-yard run (Ricky Aguayo kick), Seminoles 14–10. Drive: 3 plays, 9 yards, TOP 0:53
- 2:01 FSU – Nyqwan Murray 33-yard pass from Deondre Francois (Ricky Aguayo kick), Seminoles 21–10. Drive: 7 plays, 73 yards, TOP 3:01

Third Quarter

- 14:30 FSU –Cam Akers 58-yard run (Ricky Aguayo kick), Seminoles 28–10. Drive: 2 plays, 75 yards, TOP 0:30
- 11:19 FSU – Ricky Aguayo 49-yard field goal, Seminoles 31–10. Drive: 5 plays, 14 yards, TOP 1:27

Fourth Quarter

- 9:43 FSU – Tre'Shaun Harrison 21-yard pass from Deondre Francois (Ricky Aguayo kick), Seminoles 38–10. Drive: 4 plays, 34 yards, TOP 1:46
- 4:36 WAKE – Sage Surratt 9-yard pass from Sam Hartman (Nick Sciba kick), Seminoles 38–17. Drive: 12 plays, 75 yards, TOP 5:07

Top Passers

- WAKE – Sam Hartman, 22/46, 227 yards, 2 touchdowns, 1 interception
- FSU – Deondre Francois, 29/40, 353 yards, 2 touchdowns

Top Rushers

- WAKE – Matt Coburn II, 21 carries, 71 yards
- FSU – Cam Akers, 13 carries, 98 yards, 2 touchdowns

Top Receiving

- WAKE – Jaquarii Roberson, 3 receptions, 57 yards
- FSU – Nyqwan Murray, 8 receptions, 131 yards, 1 touchdown

Leading Tacklers

- WAKE – Cam Glenn, 12 tackles
- FSU – Stanford Samuels III, 8 tackles

=== At Louisville ===
Week Nine: Wake Forest Demon Deacons at Louisville Cardinals – Game summary

Quarter	1	2	3	4	Total
Demon Deacons	21	14	21	0	56
Cardinals	7	14	14	0	35

at Cardinal Stadium • Louisville, KY

- Date: October 27
- Game time: 12:00 p.m. ET
- Game weather: 46 °F (8 °C) • WNW 10 mph (16 km/h) • Cloudy
- Game attendance: 49,603
- Referee: R. Johnson
- TV announcers (ACCRSN): Play-by-Play: Evan Lepler • Color Analyst: Brian Jordan • Sideline: Kelsey Wingert

Game information

First Quarter

- 12:39 LOU – Trey Smith 52-yard run (Blanton Creque kick), Cardinals 7–0. Drive: 6 plays, 75 yards, TOP 2:21
- 11:01 WAKE – Jack Freudenthal 28-yard pass from Sam Hartman (Nick Sciba kick), Tied 7–7. Drive: 6 plays, 81 yards, TOP 1:38
- 6:16 WAKE – Sam Hartman 12-yard run (Nick Sciba kick), Demon Deacons 14–7. Drive: 8 plays, 80 yards, TOP 2:07
- 2:29 WAKE – Scotty Washington 9-yard pass from Sam Hartman (Nick Sciba kick), Demon Deacons 21–7. Drive: 7 plays, 63 yards, TOP 1:47

Second Quarter

- 9:50 LOU – Trey Smith 1-yard run (Blanton Creque kick), Demon Deacons 21–14. Drive: 9 plays, 44 yards, TOP 3:35
- 9:34 WAKE – Matt Colburn 74-yard run (Nick Sciba kick), Demon Deacons 28–14. Drive: 1 play, 74 yards, TOP 0:16
- 9:20 WAKE – Carlos Basham Jr. 23-yard fumble return (Nick Sciba kick), Demon Deacons 35–14. Drive: 1 play, -2 yards, TOP 0:14
- 0:53 LOU – Seth Dawkins 19-yard pass from Jawon Pass (Blanton Creque kick), Demon Deacons 35–21. Drive: 7 plays, 61 yards, TOP 2:50

Third Quarter

- 13:49 WAKE – Matt Colburn 56-yard run (Nick Sciba kick), Demon Deacons 42–21. Drive: 4 plays, 75 yards, TOP 1:11
- 9:50 LOU – Hassan Hall 12-yard run (Blanton Creque kick), Demon Deacons 42–28. Drive: 10 plays, 89 yards, TOP 3:59
- 6:40 WAKE – Cade Carney 1-yard run (Nick Sciba kick), Demon Deacons 49–28. Drive: 13 plays, 75 yards, TOP 3:10
- 3:41 WAKE – Matt Colburn 12-yard run (Nick Sciba kick), Demon Deacons 56–28. Drive: 7 plays, 48 yards, TOP 2:01
- 2:37 LOU – Trey Smith 2-yard run (Blanton Creque kick), Demon Deacons 56–35. Drive: 3 plays, 40 yards, TOP 1:04

Top Passers

- WAKE – Sam Hartman, 16/24, 223 yards, 2 touchdowns
- LOU – Jawon Pass, 30/54, 358 yards, 1 touchdown

Top Rushers

- WAKE – Matt Colburn II, 20 carries, 243 yards, 3 touchdowns
- LOU – Trey Smith, 13 carries, 98 yards, 3 touchdowns

Top Receiving

- WAKE – Greg Dortch, 8 receptions, 135 yards
- LOU – Tutu Atwell, 8 receptions, 132 yards

Leading Tacklers

- WAKE – Cam Glenn, 13 tackles
- LOU – Dorian Etheridge, 8 tackles

Players of the Week

- Matt Colburn II (ACC Running Back of the Week)
- Carlos Basham Jr. (ACC Defensive Linemen of the Week)
- Cam Glenn (ACC Defensive Back of the Week)

=== Syracuse ===
Week Ten: Syracuse Orange at Wake Forest Demon Deacons – Game summary

Quarter	1	2	3	4	Total
No. 22 Orange	14	7	14	6	41
Demon Deacons	10	0	14	0	24

at BB&T Field • Winston-Salem, NC

- Date: November 3
- Game time: 12:00 p.m. ET
- Game weather: 54 °F (12 °C) • W 11 mph (18 km/h) • Sunny
- Game attendance: 26,136
- Referee: Duane Heydt
- TV announcers (ACCRSN): Play-by-Play: Wes Durham • Color Analyst: James Bate • Sideline: Rebecca Kaple

Game information

First Quarter

- 11:42 WAKE – Cade Carney 2-yard run (Nick Sciba kick), Demon Deacons 7–0. Drive: 7 plays, 47 yards, TOP 1:43
- 6:12 WAKE – Nick Sciba 22-yard field goal, Demon Deacons 10–0. Drive: 5 plays, 13 yards, TOP 1:35
- 4:17 SYR – Moe Neal 8-yard run (Andre Szmyt kick), Demon Deacons 10–7. Drive: 7 plays, 75 yards, TOP 1:55
- 0:52 SYR – Jarveon Howard 1-yard run (Andre Szmyt kick), Orange 14–10. Drive: 4 plays, 10 yards, TOP 1:16

Second Quarter

- 0:58 SYR – Jarveon Howard 1-yard run (Andre Szmyt kick), Orange 21–10. Drive: 10 plays, 57 yards, TOP 3:53

Third Quarter

- 10:43 SYR – Chris Elmore 5-yard run (Andre Szmyt kick), Orange 28–10. Drive: 10 plays, 65 yards, TOP 4:17
- 8:57 WAKE – Scotty Washington 20-yard pass from Sam Hartman (Nick Sciba kick), Orange 28–17. Drive: 7 plays, 75 yards, TOP 1:46
- 5:49 SYR – Eric Dungey 26-yard run (Andre Szmyt kick), Orange 35–17. Drive: 8 plays, 75 yards, TOP 3:08
- 3:38 WAKE – Greg Dortch 8-yard pass from Sam Hartman (Nick Sciba kick), Orange 35–24. Drive: 8 plays, 75 yards, TOP 2:11

Fourth Quarter

- 11:55 SYR – Andre Szmyt 28-yard field goal, Orange 38–24. Drive: 9 plays, 24 yards, TOP 3:09
- 7:01 SYR – Andre Szmyt 34-yard field goal, Orange 41–24. Drive: 6 plays, 15 yards, TOP 3:48

Top Passers

- SYR – Eric Dungey, 23/35, 157 yards
- WAKE – Sam Hartman, 21/37, 275 yards, 2 touchdowns, 1 interception

Top Rushers

- SYR – Eric Dungey, 24 carries, 119 yards, 1 touchdown
- WAKE – Matt Colburn, 15 carries, 67 yards

Top Receiving

- SYR – Sean Riley, 8 receptions, 64 yards
- WAKE – Greg Dortch, 9 receptions, 95 yards, 1 touchdown

Leading Tacklers

- SYR – Ryan Guthrie, 8 tackles, 2 sacks/tackle-for-loss
- WAKE – Justin Strnad, 14 tackles

=== At NC State ===
Week Eleven: Wake Forest Demon Deacons at NC State Wolfpack – Game summary

Quarter	1	2	3	4	Total
Demon Deacons	0	3	10	14	27
No. 22 Wolfpack	6	7	3	7	23

at Carter–Finley Stadium • Raleigh, NC

- Date: November 8
- Game time: 7:30 p.m. ET
- Game weather: 58 °F (14 °C) • NE 7 mph (11 km/h) • Cloudy
- Game attendance: 56,228
- Referee: Jeff Heaser
- TV announcers (ESPN): Play-by-Play: Dave Flemming • Color Analyst: Matt Hasselbeck • Sideline: Tim Hasselbeck and Laura Rutledge

Game information

First Quarter

- 12:42 NCST – Christopher Dunn 29-yard field goal, Wolfpack 3–0. Drive: 4 plays, 0 yards, TOP 1:22
- 0:52 NCST – Christopher Dunn 23-yard field goal, Wolfpack 6–0. Drive: 8 plays, 57 yards, TOP 3:40

Second Quarter

- 9:47 WAKE – Nick Sciba 47-yard field goal, Wolfpack 6–3. Drive: 8 plays, 60 yards, TOP 3:23
- 4:36 NCST – Ryan Finley 2-yard run (Christopher Dunn kick), Wolfpack 13–3. Drive: 11 plays, 75 yards, TOP 5:11

Third Quarter

- 11:47 WAKE – Nick Sciba 34-yard field goal, Wolfpack 13–10. Drive: 10 plays, 59 yards, TOP 3:13
- 3:40 NCST – Christopher Dunn 23-yard field goal, Wolfpack 16–10. Drive: 10 plays, 36 yards, TOP 3:50
- 2:05 WAKE – Alex Bachman 38-yard pass from Jamie Newman (Nick Sciba kick), Wolfpack 16–13. Drive: 4 plays, 83 yards, TOP 1:35

Fourth Quarter

- 14:53 NCST – Emeka Emezie 35-yard pass from Ryan Finley (Christopher Dunn kick), Wolfpack 23–13. Drive: 6 plays, 75 yards, TOP 2:12
- 6:07 WAKE – Greg Dortch 19-yard pass from Jamie Newman (Nick Sciba kick), Wolfpack 23–20. Drive: 9 plays, 61 yards, TOP 3:09
- 0:30 WAKE – Jack Freudenthal 32-yard pass from Jamie Newman (Nick Sciba kick), Demon Deacons 27–23. Drive: 8 plays, 80 yards, TOP 1:09

Top Passers

- WAKE – Jamie Newman, 22/33, 297 yards, 3 touchdowns
- NCST – Ryan Finley, 35/52, 374 yards, 1 touchdown, 1 interception

Top Rushers

- WAKE – Cade Carney, 12 carries, 68 yards,
- NCST – Reggie Gallaspy II, 14 carries, 36 yards

Top Receiving

- WAKE – Sage Surratt, 8 receptions, 109 yards
- NCST – Kelvin Harmon, 15 receptions, 134 yards

Leading Tacklers

- WAKE – Amari Henderson, 14 tackles
- NCST – Jarius Morehead, 14 tackles

Players of the Week

- Jamie Newman (Manning Award Stars of the Week)
- Cam Glenn (ACC Defensive Back of the Week)

=== Pittsburgh ===
Week Twelve: Pittsburgh Panthers at Wake Forest Demon Deacons – Game summary

Quarter	1	2	3	4	Total
Panthers	0	6	14	14	34
Demon Deacons	3	7	0	3	13

at BB&T Field • Winston-Salem, NC

- Date: November 17
- Game time: 12:00 p.m. ET
- Game weather: 54 °F (12 °C) • ENE 4 mph (6.4 km/h) • Sunny
- Game attendance: 25,609
- Referee: Duane Heydt
- TV announcers (ACCRSN): Play-by-Play: Evan Lepler • Color Analyst: Takeo Spikes • Sideline: Stormy Buonantony

Game information

First Quarter

- 10:50 WAKE – Nick Sciba 32-yard field goal, Demon Deacons 3–0. Drive: 8 plays, 54 yards, TOP 2:33

Second Quarter

- 4:03 PITT – Darrin Hall 2-yard run (Alex Kessman kick blocked), Panthers 6–3. Drive: 14 plays, 85 yards, TOP 8:49
- 1:32 WAKE – Alex Bachman 28-yard pass from Jamie Newman (Nick Sciba kick), Demon Deacons 10–6. Drive: 9 plays, 75 yards, TOP 2:31

Third Quarter

- 4:03 PITT – Rafael Araujo-Lopes 4-yard pass from Kenny Pickett (Alex Kessman kick), Panthers 13–10. Drive: 11 plays, 66 yards, TOP 6:58
- 1:14 PITT – Taysir Mack 63-yard pass from Kenny Pickett (Alex Kessman kick), Panthers 20–10. Drive: 4 plays, 75 yards, TOP 1:33

Fourth Quarter

- 12:30 WAKE – Nick Sciba 20-yard field goal, Panthers 20–13. Drive: 12 plays, 73 yards, TOP 3:44
- 7:27 PITT – Maurice Ffrench 23-yard pass from Kenny Pickett (Alex Kessman kick), Panthers 27–13. Drive: 11 plays, 78 yards, TOP 5:03
- 3:22 PITT – Stefano Millin 6-yard run (Alex Kessman kick), Panthers 34–13. Drive: 8 plays, 42 yards, 3:24

Top Passers

- PITT – Kenny Pickett, 23/30, 316 yards, 3 touchdowns
- WAKE – Jamie Newman, 15/30, 206 yards, 1 touchdown, 2 interception

Top Rushers

- PITT – Qadree Ollison, 18 carries, 52 yards
- WAKE – Cade Carney, 16 carries, 62 yards

Top Receiving

- PITT – Taysir Mack, 3 receptions, 105 yards, 1 touchdown
- WAKE – Sage Surratt, 3 receptions, 67 yards

Leading Tacklers

- PITT – Oluwaseun Idowu, 8 tackles, 1 tackle-for-loss
- WAKE – Cam Glenn, 11 tackles, 0.5 sacks/tackle-for-loss

=== At Duke ===
Week Thirteen: Wake Forest Demon Deacons at Duke Blue Devils – Game summary

Quarter	1	2	3	4	Total
Demon Deacons	21	10	14	14	59
Blue Devils	0	7	0	0	7

at Wallace Wade Stadium • Durham, NC

- Date: November 24
- Game time: 12:30 p.m. ET
- Game weather: 45 °F (7 °C) • NNE 5 mph (8.0 km/h) • Rain
- Game attendance: 20,782
- Referee: Tra Blake
- TV announcers (ACCRSN): Play-by-Play: Wes Durham • Color Analyst: James Bate • Sideline: Rebecca Kaple

Game information

First Quarter

- 12:11 WAKE – Cade Carney 5-yard run (Nick Sciba kick), Demon Deacons 7–0. Drive: 9 plays, 74 yards, TOP 2:49
- 7:02 WAKE – Greg Dortch 15-yard pass from Jamie Newman (Nick Sciba kick), Demon Deacons 14–0. Drive: 3 plays, 17 yards, TOP 0:58
- 1:29 WAKE – Scotty Washington 9-yard pass from Jamie Newman (Nick Sciba kick), Demon Deacons 21–0. Drive: 12 plays, 80 yards, TOP 3:53

Second Quarter

- 12:48 DUKE – Deon Jackson 6-yard pass from Daniel Jones (Collin Wareham kick), Demon Deacons 21–7. Drive: 14 plays, 83 yards, TOP 3:35
- 4:10 WAKE – Nasir Greer 20-yard interception return (Nick Sciba kick), Demon Deacons 28–7. Drive: 1 play, 0 yards, TOP 0:07
- 0:00 WAKE – Nick Sciba 20 yard field goal, Demon Deacons 31–7. Drive: 11 plays, 72 yards, TOP 4:10

Third Quarter

- 9:54 WAKE – Alex Bachman 6-yard pass from Jamie Newman (Nick Sciba kick), Demon Deacons 38–7. Drive: 9 plays, 70 yards, TOP 3:48
- 1:24 WAKE – Sage Surratt 9-yard pass from Jamie Newman (Nick Sciba kick), Demon Deacons 45–7. Drive: 9 plays, 80 yards, TOP 5:28

Fourth Quarter

- 10:15 WAKE – Cade Carney 12-yard run (Nick Sciba kick), Demon Deacons 52–7. Drive: 3 plays, 33 yards, TOP 1:35
- 4:20 WAKE – Kendall Hinton 11-yard run (Zach Murphy kick), Demon Deacons 59–7. Drive: 6 plays, 45 yards, TOP 3:56

Top Passers

- WAKE – Jamie Newman, 18/23, 177 yards, 4 touchdowns
- DUKE – Daniel Jones, 17/36, 145 yards, 1 touchdown, 1 interception

Top Rushers

- WAKE – Cade Carney, 31 carries, 223 yards, 2 touchdown
- DUKE – Nicodem Pierre, 2 carries, 37 yards

Top Receiving

- WAKE – Greg Dortch, 10 receptions, 124 yards, 1 touchdown
- DUKE – Deon Jackson, 7 receptions, 45 yards, 1 touchdown

Leading Tacklers

- WAKE – DJ Taylor, 6 tackles
- DUKE – Lummie Young IV, 15 tackles, 1 tackle-for-loss

Player of the Week

- Cade Carney (ACC Co-Running Back of the Week)

=== Vs. Memphis (Birmingham Bowl) ===
Birmingham Bowl: Wake Forest Demon Deacons vs. Memphis Tigers – Game summary

Quarter	1	2	3	4	Total
Tigers	14	14	0	6	34
Demon Deacons	7	17	6	7	37

at Legion Field • Birmingham, AL

- Date: December 22
- Game time: 12:00 p.m. ET
- Game weather: 47 °F (8 °C) • 5 mph (8.0 km/h) • Sunny
- Game attendance: 25,717
- Referee: Rodney Burnette
- TV announcers (ESPN): Play-by-Play: Dave Neal • Color Analyst: D.J. Shockley • Sideline: Dawn Davenport

Game information

First Quarter

- 12:28 WAKE – Sage Surratt 9-yard pass from Jamie Newman (Nick Sciba kick), Demon Deacons 7–0. Drive: 10 plays, 75 yards, TOP 2:32
- 10:06 MEM – Tony Pollard 41-yard run (Riley Patterson kick), Tied 7–7. Drive: 6 plays, 76 yards, TOP 2:22
- 3:28 MEM – Patrick Taylor Jr. 1-yard pass from Brady White (Riley Patterson kick), Tigers 14–7. Drive: 16 plays, 98 yards, TOP 5:29

Second Quarter

- 14:49 MEM – Chris Claybrooks 37-yard interception return (Riley Patterson kick), Tigers 21–7. Drive: 3 plays, 3 yards, TOP 0:28
- 11:16 WAKE – Nick Sciba 36-yard field goal, Tigers 21–10. Drive: 13 plays, 57 yards, TOP 3:33
- 11:04 MEM – Tony Pollard 97-yard kickoff return (Riley Patterson kick), Tigers 28–10. Drive: 0 plays, 0 yards, TOP 0:12
- 7:09 WAKE – Jamie Newman 1-yard run (Nick Sciba kick), Tigers 28–17. Drive: 12 plays, 75 yards, TOP 3:55
- 5:33 WAKE – Jamie Newman 17-yard run (Nick Sciba kick), Tigers 28–24. Drive: 3 plays, 56 yards, TOP 0:26

Third Quarter

- 7:41 WAKE – Nick Sciba 49-yard field goal, Tigers 28–27. Drive: 5 plays, 48 yards, TOP 1:40
- 3:49 WAKE – Nick Sciba 39-yard field goal, Demon Deacons 30–28. Drive: 12 plays, 47 yards, TOP 2:31

Fourth Quarter

- 1:15 MEM – Patrick Taylor Jr. 9-yard run (two-point pass conv. failed), Tigers 34–30. Drive: 14 plays, 88 yards, TOP 4:36
- 0:34 WAKE – Jamie Newman 1-yard run (Nick Sciba kick), Demon Deacons 37–34. Drive: 6 plays, 75 yards, TOP 0:41

Top Passers

- MEM – Brady White, 15/27, 171 yards, 1 touchdown, 1 interception
- WAKE – Jamie Newman, 22/40, 328 yards, 1 touchdown, 1 interception

Top Rushers

- MEM – Patrick Taylor, 30 carries, 110 yards, 1 touchdown
- WAKE – Jamie Newman, 23 carries, 91 yards, 3 touchdown

Top Receiving

- MEM – Damonte Coxie, 6 receptions, 70 yards,
- WAKE – Alex Bachman, 7 receptions, 171 yards

Leading Tacklers

- MEM – Curtis Atkins, 9 tackles
- WAKE – Justin Strnad, 11 tackles, 1 tackle-for-loss

== 2019 NFL draft ==
Round	Pick	Player	Position	NFL Club
4	124	Phil Haynes	G	Seattle Seahawks
