= Nick Sciba =

American football player (born 1999)

No. 16
- Position: Placekicker

Personal information
- Born: October 2, 1999 (age 27); Clover, South Carolina, U.S.
- Listed height: 5 ft 9 in (1.75 m)
- Listed weight: 191 lb (87 kg)

Career information
- High school: Clover
- College: Wake Forest
- NFL draft: 2022: undrafted

Career history
- Pittsburgh Steelers (2022); New Jersey Generals (2023)

Awards and highlights
- First-team All-ACC (2021)

Career NFL statistics
- Field goals made: 2
- Field goals attempted: 2
- Longest field goal: 38
- Stats at Pro Football Reference

Nick Sciba (born October 2, 1999) is an American former professional football player who a placekicker for the Pittsburgh Steelers of the National Football League (NFL). He played college football for the Wake Forest Demon Deacons.

== Early life ==
Sciba was born on October 2, 1999, and grew up in Clover, South Carolina. He attended Clover High School, where he played football and soccer. As a sophomore in football, he went 2-for-4 on field goals and had a long of 25, while earning a spot in the USA Football International Bowl as a U-16 team member. He was successful on 5-of-7 field foals in his junior season and recorded a long kick of 38 yards. He also had 34-of-54 kickoffs being touchbacks and made 21 of his 25 extra point attempts.

As a senior, Sciba served as team captain and recorded 8 successful field goals and 11 attempts, while making all but one of his 32 extra point attempts and sending 34 out of 49 kicks for touchbacks. He also punted for the Clover Blue Eagles and averaged 38-yards-per-punt in his final season. A three-star recruit according to 247Sports and Rivals.com, Sciba committed to Wake Forest University after being named the seventh-best kicker nationally by the former.

== College career ==
As a freshman at Wake Forest, Sciba recorded 19 successful field goals on 22 attempts, marking the team record for highest field goal percentage (86.4). With 107 total points scored, he became the first freshman in school history with over 100 and the fourth overall. He became well known for an embarrassing moment against Notre Dame in the fourth game of the 2018 season. On third down, the Wake Forest quarterback ran for what Sciba thought was a first down, but was short. When the field goal team went on to the field, Sciba stayed on the sideline, not realizing that he was supposed to be on the field. Eventually, after hearing his name repeatedly called, he sprinted onto the field and quickly went through his pre-kick routine. When the ball was snapped, Sciba kicked it and the 37-yard attempt bounced off the left upright. The moment was featured on ESPN's C'Mon Man!, SportsCenter's Not-Top 10 Plays of the Week, and was widely circulated on Twitter.

Sciba responded to the missed kick by successfully making his next 34 attempts, an all-time college football record. He began his streak in October 2018, and it continued until the end of his sophomore year, when he missed a 48-yard attempt against Syracuse. He finished his sophomore year with 24 field goals made on 25 attempts, setting the all-time record in accuracy at the school (.940). At the end of the year, Sciba was named first-team all-conference, Pro Football Focus (PFF) Atlantic Coast Conference (ACC) Kicker of the Year, and a first-team All-America selection by ESPN, as well as second-team by the Football Writers Association of America (FWAA), Sports Illustrated and Phil Steele, and third-team by Associated Press and Athlon Sports. He was also selected a semifinalist for the Lou Groza Award, given to the best kicker in all of college football.

Sciba began the 2020 season by being named preseason first-team all-conference by several different publications. He was also named preseason All-American by Sporting News, Lindy's Sports, Athlon Sports, and Street & Smith. He ended the COVID-19-shortened season having made 14-of-17 field goals, including a streak of 12-consecutive starting with October 2 against Campbell. He was a third-team all-conference pick at the end of the year.

In 2021, Sciba made 23-of-25 field goals, earning first-team all-conference honors. Although he had one year remaining of eligibility, Sciba elected to declare for the NFL draft. He finished his collegiate career with 80 field goals made on 89 attempts, setting the all-time record for accuracy at 89.9%. He also made all 193 of his extra point attempts, for a total of 433 points, on his way to becoming the all-time leader scoring in Wake Forest history.

== Professional career ==
Pre-draft measurables
Height	Weight	Arm length	Hand span
5 ft 9 3/4 in (1.77 m)	194 lb (88 kg)	28 3/4 in (0.73 m)	8 3/4 in (0.22 m)
All values from Pro Day

=== Pittsburgh Steelers ===
After going unselected in the 2022 NFL draft, Sciba was signed by the Pittsburgh Steelers as an undrafted free agent, following a successful tryout. He was waived during roster cuts, on August 23. After Steelers kicker Chris Boswell was ruled out prior to a Week 8 game against the Philadelphia Eagles, Sciba was re-signed as an emergency replacement on October 29. Sciba made his NFL debut against the Eagles on October 30, 2022, and made all three of his kicks, including field goals of 38 and 28 yards and one extra point in the 13–35 loss. Up until two days prior to making his NFL debut, Sciba had worked for a fish market. He was released on November 8.

=== New Jersey Generals ===
On January 31, 2023, Sciba signed with the New Jersey Generals of the United States Football League (USFL). The Generals folded when the XFL and USFL merged to create the United Football League (UFL).
