= Jaylin Lane =

American football player (born 2002)

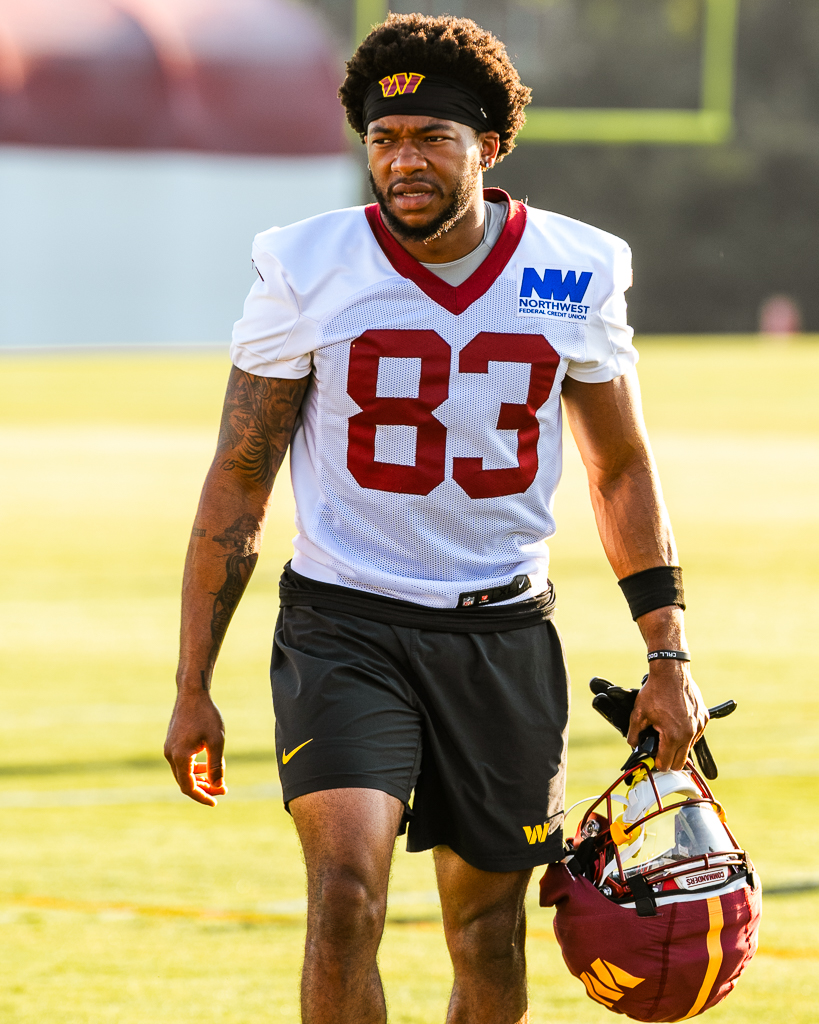
- Lane with the Washington Commanders in 2025

No. 83 – Washington Commanders
- Positions: Wide receiver, Punt returner
- Roster status: Injured reserve

Personal information
- Born: May 1, 2002 (age 24); Spartanburg County, South Carolina, U.S.
- Listed height: 5 ft 10 in (1.78 m)
- Listed weight: 196 lb (89 kg)

Career information
- High school: Clover (Clover, South Carolina)
- College: Middle Tennessee (2020–2022); Virginia Tech (2023–2024)
- NFL draft: 2025: 4th round, 128th overall pick

Career history
- Washington Commanders (2025–present)

Awards and highlights
- Third-team All-ACC (2024); Second-team All-C-USA (2022); First-team All-C-USA (2021)

Career NFL statistics as of 2026
- Receptions: 18
- Receiving yards: 250
- Return yards: 749
- Return touchdowns: 2
- Stats at Pro Football Reference

Joshua Jaylin Lane (born May 1, 2002) is an American professional football wide receiver and punt returner for the Washington Commanders of the National Football League (NFL). He played college football for the Middle Tennessee Blue Raiders and Virginia Tech Hokies. Lane was selected by the Commanders in the fourth round of the 2025 NFL draft.

== Early life ==
Lane was born on May 1, 2002, in Spartanburg County, South Carolina. As a senior at Clover High School, he had 76 receptions for 1,611 yards and 30 touchdowns. Lane played under his father, Brian, who served as head coach. He committed to Middle Tennessee State University to play college football.

== College career ==
Lane played 54 games of college football as a wide receiver and return specialist. He played for the Blue Raiders of Middle Tennessee State University from 2020 to 2022, recording 124 receptions for 1,528 yards and 10 touchdowns. He transferred to play for the Hokies of Virginia Tech in 2023, playing in 24 games over two seasons and recording 79 receptions for 1,004 yards and eight touchdowns.

== Professional career ==
Pre-draft measurables
Height	Weight	Arm length	Hand span	Wingspan	40-yard dash	10-yard split	20-yard split	20-yard shuttle	Three-cone drill	Vertical jump	Broad jump	Bench press
5 ft 9 3/4 in (1.77 m)	191 lb (87 kg)	31 3/4 in (0.81 m)	9 7/8 in (0.25 m)	6 ft 5 1/4 in (1.96 m)	4.34 s	1.50 s	2.52 s	4.12 s	6.75 s	40.0 in (1.02 m)	11 ft 0 in (3.35 m)	14 reps
All values from NFL Combine

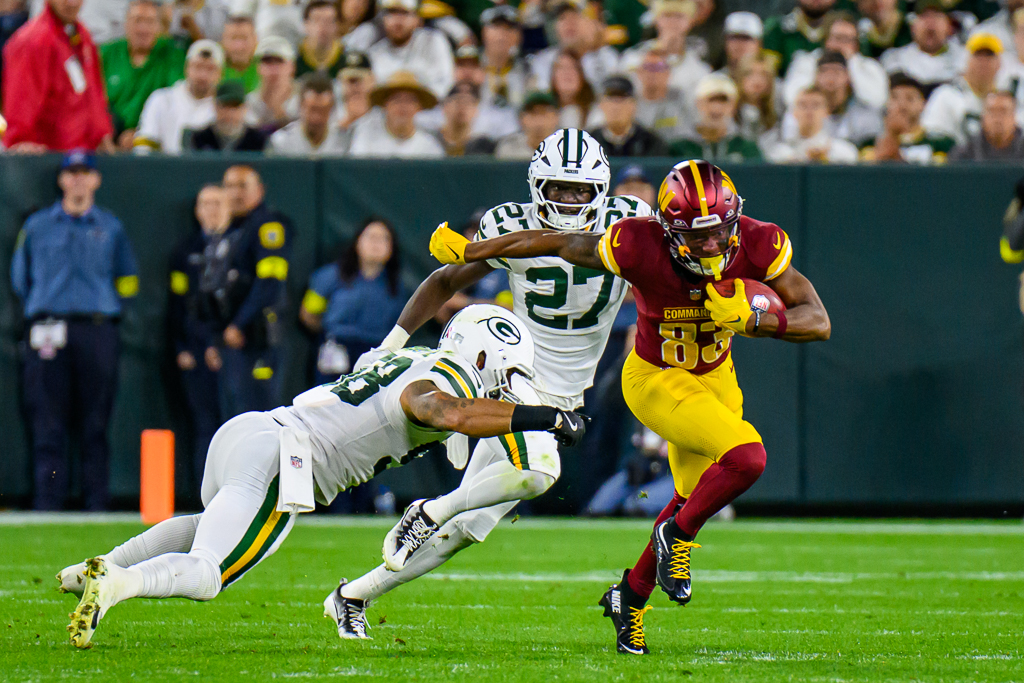
Lane with the ball in a game against the Green Bay Packers, 2025

Lane was selected by the Washington Commanders in the fourth round (128th overall) of the 2025 NFL draft. He signed his four-year rookie contract on May 9, 2025. Lane earned Rookie of the Week honors for week 3 after scoring his first career touchdown on a 90-yard punt return against the Las Vegas Raiders, tying the franchise record set by Jacquez Green's 90-yard punt return in Week 2 of the 2003 season. In the Week 15 win over the New York Giants, he recorded his second career touchdown on a 63-yard punt return. Lane made 15 appearances (four starts) for Washington during his rookie campaign, recording 16 receptions for 225 scoreless yards. On December 22, the Commanders placed Lane on season-ending injured reserve due to an ankle injury suffered in Week 16 against the Philadelphia Eagles.

In the 2026 NFL International Week 4 game in London against the Indianapolis Colts, Lane was carted off the field in the third quarter after fracturing and dislocating his ankle during a punt return. The Commanders placed him on injured reserve on October 6, 2026.

== Career statistics ==
Legend
	Led the league
**Bold**	Career high

=== NFL ===
Year	Team	Games		Receiving					Punt returns					Fumbles	
Year	Team	GP	GS	Rec	Yds	Avg	Lng	TD	Ret	Yds	Avg	Lng	TD	Fum	Lost
2025	WAS	15	4	**16**	**225**	**14.1**	**41**	0	**23**	**314**	**13.7**	**90**	**2**	**3**	**1**
2026	WAS	4	0	2	25	12.5	21	0	7	84	12.0	19	0	1	**1**
Career		19	4	18	250	13.9	41	0	30	398	13.3	90	2	4	2

=== College ===
College statistics
Year	Team	G	Receiving				Kick returns				Punt returns			
Year	Team	G	Rec	Yds	Avg	TD	Ret	Yds	Avg	TD	Ret	Yds	Avg	TD
2020	Middle Tennessee	7	13	122	9.4	1	**13**	274	21.1	–	1	10	10.0	–
2021	Middle Tennessee	12	42	466	11.1	4	**13**	**285**	21.9	–	19	**295**	**15.5**	**1**
2022	Middle Tennessee	11	**69**	**940**	**13.6**	5	11	254	**23.1**	–	18	152	8.4	–
2023	Virginia Tech	12	41	538	13.1	**6**	1	18	18.0	–	5	31	6.2	–
2024	Virginia Tech	12	38	466	12.3	2	1	21	21.0	–	**24**	245	10.2	**1**
Career		54	203	2,532	12.5	18	39	852	10.9	–	67	733	10.9	2
