= York County School District 2 =

Public school district in South Carolina, United States

York County School District 2 (Clover School District)

Address
- 604 Bethel Street Clover, South Carolina, 29710; United States

District information
- Type: Public School District
- Motto: Each child, each day...excellence
- Grades: Pre-K-12
- Superintendent: Dr. Sheila Quinn
- NCES District ID: 4503840

Students and staff
- Students: 8,372 (2020-2021)
- Faculty: 590.56 (on FTE basis)
- Student–teacher ratio: 14.18
- Athletic conference: SC Region III-AAAA

Other information
- Website: www.clover.k12.sc.us

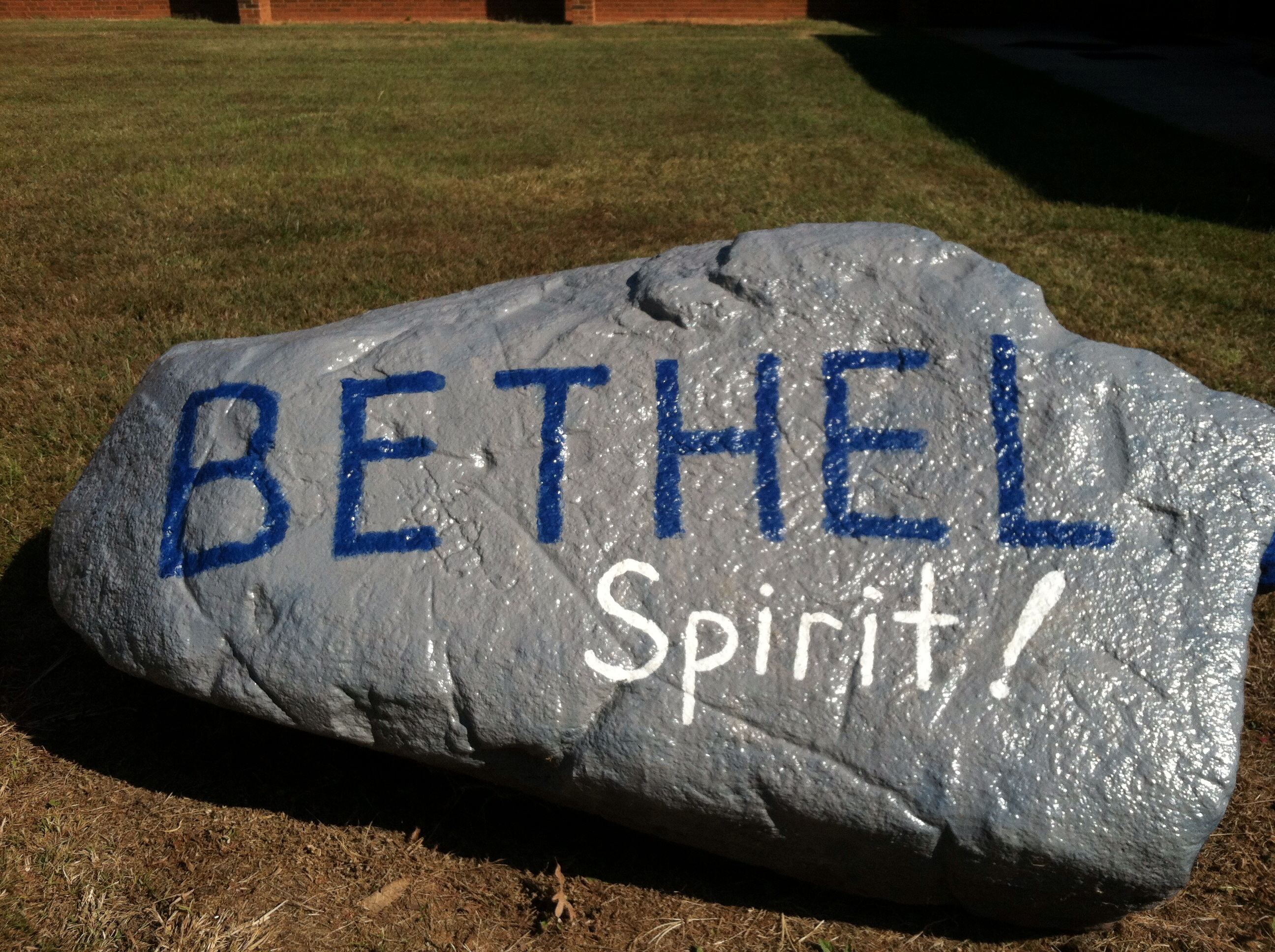
Bethel Elementary School's Spirit Rock

Clover School District, officially known as York County School District 2, is a suburban school district located in York County, in north-central South Carolina, near the North Carolina border. The district is located in a primarily rural setting in the piedmont region of South Carolina and is home to approximately 24,250 residents. The district is bordered by Cherokee County, SC to the west; York and Rock Hill to the south; and Cleveland County and Gaston County, NC to the north.

Clover School District serves roughly 6,500 students in grades pre-k through 12. The much-respected reputation of the district has helped influence a strong surge of growth to the area, particularly around Lake Wylie.

== Administration ==
The current superintendent is Dr. Sheila Quinn and the Board of Trustees is made up of seven members:

- Jay Young
- Joe Gordon
- Sherri Ciurlik
- Liz Johnson
- Mack McCarter
- Ginger Marr
- Rob Wallace

Dr. Mark Sosne, the previous superintendent, retired after the 2017–2018 school year.

== Schools ==
The district is made up of eight elementary schools, three middle schools, two high schools and an alternative school. Below is a complete list of component schools:

=== Elementary schools ===
- Bethany Elementary School
- Bethel Elementary School
- Crowders Creek Elementary School
- Griggs Road Elementary School
- Kinard Elementary School
- Larne Elementary School
- Oakridge Elementary School
- Liberty Hill Elementary School

=== Middle schools ===
- Clover Middle School
- Oakridge Middle School
- Roosevelt Middle School

=== High schools ===
- Clover High School
- Lake Wylie High School

=== Alternative schools ===
- Blue Eagle Academy
