= 2018 Syracuse Orange football team =

American college football season

2018 Syracuse Orange football

Camping World Bowl champion

Camping World Bowl, W 34–18 vs. West Virginia
- Conference: Atlantic Coast Conference
- Atlantic Division

Ranking
- Coaches: No. 15
- AP: No. 15
- Record: 10–3 (6–2 ACC)
- Head coach: Dino Babers (3rd season)
- Offensive coordinator: Mike Lynch (1st season)
- Offensive scheme: Veer and shoot
- Defensive coordinator: Brian Ward (3rd season)
- Base defense: Multiple
- Home stadium: Carrier Dome

2018 Atlantic Coast Conference football standings
| | Conf. | | | Overall |
| Team | W | | L | W | | L |
|---|---|---|---|---|---|---|
Atlantic Division
| No. 1 Clemson x$#^ | 8 | – | 0 | 15 | – | 0 |
| No. 15 Syracuse | 6 | – | 2 | 10 | – | 3 |
| NC State | 5 | – | 3 | 9 | – | 4 |
| Boston College | 4 | – | 4 | 7 | – | 5 |
| Wake Forest | 3 | – | 5 | 7 | – | 6 |
| Florida State | 3 | – | 5 | 5 | – | 7 |
| Louisville | 0 | – | 8 | 2 | – | 10 |
Coastal Division
| Pittsburgh x | 6 | – | 2 | 7 | – | 7 |
| Georgia Tech | 5 | – | 3 | 7 | – | 6 |
| Miami (FL) | 4 | – | 4 | 7 | – | 6 |
| Virginia | 4 | – | 4 | 8 | – | 5 |
| Virginia Tech | 4 | – | 4 | 6 | – | 7 |
| Duke | 3 | – | 5 | 8 | – | 5 |
| North Carolina | 1 | – | 7 | 2 | – | 9 |
Championship: Clemson 42, Pittsburgh 10
# – College Football Playoff champion; ^ – College Football Playoff participant; $ – Conference champion; x – Division champion/co-champions; Rankings from AP Poll

The 2018 Syracuse Orange football team represented Syracuse University during the 2018 NCAA Division I FBS football season. The Orange were led by third-year head coach Dino Babers and played their home games at the Carrier Dome. They competed as members of the Atlantic Division of the Atlantic Coast Conference. After being picked to finish last in the preseason media poll, Syracuse went 10–3, 6–2 in ACC play to finish in 2nd place in the Atlantic Division, their first winning season and bowl invitation since 2013. They were invited to the Camping World Bowl, where they defeated West Virginia.

== Recruiting ==
=== Position key ===
| Back | B | Center | C | Cornerback | CB | Defensive back | DB |
| Defensive end | DE | Defensive lineman | DL | Defensive tackle | DT | End | E |
| Fullback | FB | Guard | G | Halfback | HB | Kicker | K |
| Kickoff returner | KR | Offensive tackle | OT | Offensive lineman | OL | Linebacker | LB |
| Long snapper | LS | Punter | P | Punt returner | PR | Quarterback | QB |
| Running back | RB | Safety | S | Tight end | TE | Wide receiver | WR |

=== Recruits ===
The Orange signed a total of 18 recruits.

College recruiting information (2018)
| Name | Hometown | School | Height | Weight | Commit date |
|---|---|---|---|---|---|
| Gabe Horan; TE | Baldwinsville, New York | Charles W. Baker High School | 6 ft 6 in (1.98 m) | 260 lb (120 kg) | Feb 9, 2017 |
| Gabe Horan; TE | Recruit ratings: Scout: Rivals: 247Sports: ESPN: | | | | |
| Atrilleon Williams; DB | White Plains, New York | Archbishop Stepinac High School | 6 ft 2 in (1.88 m) | 190 lb (86 kg) | Mar 27, 2017 |
| Atrilleon Williams; DB | Recruit ratings: Scout: Rivals: 247Sports: ESPN: | | | | |
| Cooper Lutz; WR | Reading, Pennsylvania | Berks Catholic High School | 5 ft 11 in (1.80 m) | 190 lb (86 kg) | Apr 20, 2017 |
| Cooper Lutz; WR | Recruit ratings: Scout: Rivals: 247Sports: ESPN: | | | | |
| Juan Wallace; LB | Washington, D.C. | IMG Academy | 6 ft 2 in (1.88 m) | 215 lb (98 kg) | May 4, 2017 |
| Juan Wallace; LB | Recruit ratings: Scout: Rivals: 247Sports: ESPN: | | | | |
| Akeem Dixon; RB | Vero Beach, Florida | Vero Beach High School | 6 ft 0 in (1.83 m) | 235 lb (107 kg) | May 17, 2017 |
| Akeem Dixon; RB | Recruit ratings: Scout: Rivals: 247Sports: ESPN: | | | | |
| Anthony Queeley; WR | Orlando, Florida | Lake Nona High School | 6 ft 2 in (1.88 m) | 195 lb (88 kg) | Jun 18, 2017 |
| Anthony Queeley; WR | Recruit ratings: Scout: Rivals: 247Sports: ESPN: | | | | |
| Willem Froumy; OT | Exeter, New Hampshire | Exeter High School | 6 ft 6 in (1.98 m) | 290 lb (130 kg) | Jun 20, 2017 |
| Willem Froumy; OT | Recruit ratings: Scout: Rivals: 247Sports: ESPN: | | | | |
| Taj Harris; WR | Palmyra, New Jersey | Palmyra High School | 6 ft 2 in (1.88 m) | 175 lb (79 kg) | Jun 24, 2017 |
| Taj Harris; WR | Recruit ratings: Scout: Rivals: 247Sports: ESPN: | | | | |
| Edward Hendrix; WR | Washington, D.C. | H.D. Woodson High School | 6 ft 3 in (1.91 m) | 185 lb (84 kg) | Aug 16, 2017 |
| Edward Hendrix; WR | Recruit ratings: Scout: Rivals: 247Sports: ESPN: | | | | |
| Cameron Jonas; S | West Palm Beach, Florida | Dwyer High School | 6 ft 1 in (1.85 m) | 187 lb (85 kg) | Aug 21, 2017 |
| Cameron Jonas; S | Recruit ratings: Scout: Rivals: 247Sports: ESPN: | | | | |
| Qadir White; OT | Bronx, New York | Cardinal Hayes High School | 6 ft 7 in (2.01 m) | 334 lb (151 kg) | Aug 24, 2017 |
| Qadir White; OT | Recruit ratings: Scout: Rivals: 247Sports: ESPN: | | | | |
| Andre Cisco; S | Valley Stream, New York | IMG Academy | 6 ft 0 in (1.83 m) | 186 lb (84 kg) | Dec 8, 2017 |
| Andre Cisco; S | Recruit ratings: Scout: Rivals: 247Sports: ESPN: | | | | |
| Tre Allison; LB | Tyler, Texas | John Tyler High School | 6 ft 1 in (1.85 m) | 212 lb (96 kg) | Dec 10, 2017 |
| Tre Allison; LB | Recruit ratings: Scout: Rivals: 247Sports: ESPN: | | | | |
| Lakiem Williams; LB | Tacoma, Washington | Butte College | 6 ft 2 in (1.88 m) | 240 lb (110 kg) | Dec 10, 2017 |
| Lakiem Williams; LB | Recruit ratings: Scout: Rivals: 247Sports: ESPN: | | | | |
| Carlos Vettorello; OG | Detroit, Michigan | University of Detroit Jesuit High School | 6 ft 4 in (1.93 m) | 277 lb (126 kg) | Dec 12, 2017 |
| Carlos Vettorello; OG | Recruit ratings: Scout: Rivals: 247Sports: ESPN: | | | | |
| Chance Amie; QB | Tyler, Texas | Robert E. Lee High School | 6 ft 3 in (1.91 m) | 191 lb (87 kg) | Dec 20, 2017 |
| Chance Amie; QB | Recruit ratings: Scout: Rivals: 247Sports: ESPN: | | | | |
| Jarveon Howard; RB | Columbia, Mississippi | East Marion High School | 5 ft 10 in (1.78 m) | 202 lb (92 kg) | Jan 29, 2018 |
| Jarveon Howard; RB | Recruit ratings: Scout: Rivals: 247Sports: ESPN: | | | | |
| Caleb Okechukwu; DE | Washington, D.C. | St. John's College High School | 6 ft 4 in (1.93 m) | 240 lb (110 kg) | Feb 7, 2018 |
| Caleb Okechukwu; DE | Recruit ratings: Scout: Rivals: 247Sports: ESPN: | | | | |
Overall recruit ranking:
Note: In many cases, Scout, Rivals, 247Sports, On3, and ESPN may conflict in their listings of height and weight.; In these cases, the average was taken. ESPN grades are on a 100-point scale.; Sources: "Syracuse Football Commitments". Rivals.; "2018 Team Ranking". Rivals.com.

== Preseason ==
=== Award watch lists ===
Listed in the order that they were released

| Award | Player | Position | Year |
|---|---|---|---|
| Maxwell Award | Eric Dungey | QB | SR |
| John Mackey Award | Ravian Pierce | TE | SR |
| Ray Guy Award | Sterling Hofrichter | P | JR |
| Paul Hornung Award | Sean Riley | WR/KR | JR |
| Wuerffel Trophy | Kielan Whitner | LB | SR |
| Johnny Unitas Golden Arm Award | Eric Dungey | QB | SR |
| Earl Campbell Tyler Rose Award | Koda Martin | OL | SR |

=== ACC media poll ===
The ACC media poll was released on July 24, 2018.

Media poll (Atlantic)
| Predicted finish | Team | Votes (1st place) |
| 1 | Clemson | 1,031 (145) |
| 2 | Florida State | 789 (1) |
| 3 | NC State | 712 (2) |
| 4 | Boston College | 545 |
| 5 | Louisville | 422 |
| 6 | Wake Forest | 413 |
| 7 | Syracuse | 232 |

== Schedule ==
| Date | Time | Opponent | Rank | Site | TV | Result | Attendance |
|---|---|---|---|---|---|---|---|
| August 31 | 6:00 p.m. | at Western Michigan* | | Waldo Stadium; Kalamazoo, MI | CBSSN | W 55–42 | 20,628 |
| September 8 | 3:30 p.m. | Wagner* | | Carrier Dome; Syracuse, NY | ACCN Extra | W 62–10 | 29,395 |
| September 15 | 12:00 p.m. | Florida State | | Carrier Dome; Syracuse, NY | ESPN | W 30–7 | 37,457 |
| September 22 | 4:00 p.m. | UConn* | | Carrier Dome; Syracuse, NY (rivalry) | ESPNews | W 51–21 | 36,632 |
| September 29 | 12:00 p.m. | at No. 3 Clemson | | Memorial Stadium; Clemson, SC | ABC | L 23–27 | 80,122 |
| October 6 | 12:20 p.m. | at Pittsburgh | | Heinz Field; Pittsburgh, PA (rivalry) | ACCN | L 37–44 ^{OT} | 37,100 |
| October 20 | 12:20 p.m. | North Carolina^{†} | | Carrier Dome; Syracuse, NY | ACCN | W 40–37 ^{2OT} | 35,210 |
| October 27 | 7:00 p.m. | No. 22 NC State | | Carrier Dome; Syracuse, NY | ESPN2 | W 51–41 | 40,769 |
| November 3 | 12:00 p.m. | at Wake Forest | No. 19 | BB&T Field; Winston-Salem, NC | ACCRSN | W 41–24 | 26,136 |
| November 9 | 7:00 p.m. | Louisville | No. 13 | Carrier Dome; Syracuse, NY | ESPN2 | W 54–23 | 42,797 |
| November 17 | 2:30 p.m. | vs. No. 3 Notre Dame* | No. 12 | Yankee Stadium; Bronx, NY | NBC | L 3–36 | 48,104 |
| November 24 | 12:00 p.m. | at Boston College | No. 20 | Alumni Stadium; Chestnut Hill, MA | ESPN | W 42–21 | 34,959 |
| December 28 | 5:15 p.m. | vs. No. 16 West Virginia* | No. 20 | Camping World Stadium; Orlando, FL (Camping World Bowl) (rivalry) | ESPN | W 34–18 | 41,125 |
*Non-conference game; ^{†}Homecoming; Rankings from AP Poll and CFP Rankings after October 30 released prior to game; All times are in Eastern time

Schedule Source:

== Rankings ==
Ranking movements Legend: ██ Increase in ranking ██ Decrease in ranking — = Not ranked RV = Received votes
| | Week | | | | | | | | | | | | | | | |
| Poll | Pre | 1 | 2 | 3 | 4 | 5 | 6 | 7 | 8 | 9 | 10 | 11 | 12 | 13 | 14 | Final |
|---|---|---|---|---|---|---|---|---|---|---|---|---|---|---|---|---|
| AP | — | — | — | RV | RV | RV | — | — | — | 22 | 13 | 12 | 19 | 18 | 17 | 15 |
| Coaches | — | — | — | RV | RV | RV | RV | — | RV | 24 | 13 | 12 | 19 | 18 | 17 | 15 |
| CFP | Not released | | | | | | | | | 19 | 13 | 12 | 20 | 20 | 20 | Not released |

== Game summaries ==
=== At Western Michigan ===
Syracuse at Western Michigan

| Team | 1 | 2 | 3 | 4 | Total |
|---|---|---|---|---|---|
| • Orange | 24 | 10 | 14 | 7 | 55 |
| Broncos | 7 | 0 | 28 | 7 | 42 |

- Date: August 31
- Location:
  Waldo Stadium
  Kalamazoo, MI
- Game start: 6:02 p.m. EDT
- Elapsed time: 4:02
- Game attendance: 20,628
- Game weather: 82°F • SSE 9 • Sunny
- Referee: Jeff Heaser
- TV announcers (CBS):
  Play-by-Play: Dave Ryan
  Analyst: Corey Chavous
  Sideline reporter: Lauren Gardner

Scoring summary
| 1 | 11:36 | SU | Jamal Custis 27-yard pass from Eric Dungey (Andre Szmyt kick) | SU 7–0 |
| 1 | 9:32 | SU | Andre Szmyt 26-yard field goal | SU 10–0 |
| 1 | 6:39 | SU | Moe Neal 1-yard run (Andre Szmyt kick) | SU 17–0 |
| 1 | 3:10 | WMU | LeVante Bellamy 7-yard run (Josh Grant kick) | SU 17–7 |
| 1 | 0:51 | SU | Moe Neal 3-yard run (Andre Szmyt kick) | SU 24–7 |
| 2 | 11:53 | SU | Dontae Strickland 1-yard run (Andre Szmyt kick) | SU 31–7 |
| 2 | 9:52 | SU | Andre Szmyt 43-yard field goal | SU 34–7 |
| 3 | 14:06 | WMU | D'Wayne Eskridge 21-yard pass from Jon Wassink (Josh Grant kick) | SU 34–14 |
| 3 | 7:32 | WMU | D'Wayne Eskridge 84-yard pass from Jon Wassink (Josh Grant kick) | SU 34–21 |
| 3 | 5:19 | WMU | LeVante Bellamy 64-yard run (Josh Grant kick) | SU 34–28 |
| 3 | 2:45 | SU | Jamal Custis 21-yard pass from Eric Dungey (Andre Szmyt kick) | SU 41–28 |
| 3 | 1:56 | WMU | Jon Wassink 4-yard run (Josh Grant kick) | SU 41–35 |
| 3 | 0:48 | SU | Dontae Strickland 1-yard run (Andre Szmyt kick) | SU 48–35 |
| 4 | 14:46 | SU | Eric Dungey 27-yard run (Andre Szmyt kick) | SU 55–35 |
| 4 | 2:50 | WMU | Jayden Reed 17-yard pass from Jon Wassink (Josh Grant kick) | SU 55–42 |

=== Wagner ===
Wagner at Syracuse

| Team | 1 | 2 | 3 | 4 | Total |
|---|---|---|---|---|---|
| Seahawks | 7 | 0 | 0 | 3 | 10 |
| • Orange | 21 | 24 | 14 | 3 | 62 |

- Date: September 8
- Location:
  Carrier Dome
  Syracuse, NY
- Game start: 3:35 p.m. EDT
- Elapsed time: 3:22
- Game attendance: 29,395
- Referee: Todd Boyd
- TV announcers:
  Play-by-Play: Doug Sherman
  Analyst: Al Groh

Scoring summary
| 1 | 11:47 | SU | Sean Riley 16-yard pass from Eric Dungey (Andre Szmyt kick) | SU 7–0 |
| 1 | 9:47 | SU | Dontae Strickland 1-yard run (Andre Szmyt kick) | SU 14–0 |
| 1 | 7:56 | WAG | Chris Woodard 24-yard pass from T.J. Linta (Eric Silvester kick) | SU 14–7 |
| 1 | 0:38 | SU | Taj Harris 24-yard pass from Eric Dungey (Andre Szmyt kick) | SU 21–7 |
| 2 | 9:43 | SU | Ravian Pierce 3-yard pass from Eric Dungey (Andre Szmyt kick) | SU 28–7 |
| 2 | 5:48 | SU | Andre Szmyt 38-yard field goal | SU 31–7 |
| 2 | 4:23 | SU | Trill Williams 2-yard return of a blocked punt (Andre Szmyt kick) | SU 34–7 |
| 2 | 0:34 | SU | Nykeim Johnson 28-yard pass from Eric Dungey (Andre Szmyt kick) | SU 41–7 |
| 3 | 13:07 | SU | Dontae Strickland 20-yard run (Andre Szmyt kick) | SU 48–7 |
| 3 | 6:25 | SU | Jamal Custis 4-yard pass from Eric Dungey (Andre Szmyt kick) | SU 55–7 |
| 4 | 12:53 | WAG | Eric Silvester 26-yard field goal | SU 55–10 |
| 4 | 11:45 | SU | Andre Szmyt 50-yard field goal | SU 62–10 |

=== Florida State ===
Florida State at Syracuse

| Team | 1 | 2 | 3 | 4 | Total |
|---|---|---|---|---|---|
| Seminoles | 0 | 0 | 0 | 7 | 7 |
| • Orange | 3 | 3 | 14 | 10 | 30 |

- Date: September 15
- Location:
  Carrier Dome
  Syracuse, NY
- Game start: 12:02 p.m. EDT
- Elapsed time: 3:39
- Game attendance: 37,457
- Referee: David Epperley
- TV announcers (ESPN):
  Play-by-Play: Mark Jones
  Analyst: Dusty Dvoracek
  Sideline reporter: Molly McGrath

Scoring summary
| 1 | 7:23 | SU | Andre Szmyt 22-yard field goal | SU 3–0 |
| 2 | 1:40 | SU | Andre Szmyt 19-yard field goal | SU 6–0 |
| 3 | 6:55 | SU | Tommy DeVito 3-yard run (Andre Szmyt kick) | SU 13–0 |
| 3 | 3:33 | SU | Ravian Pierce 3-yard pass from Tommy DeVito (Andre Szmyt kick) | SU 20–0 |
| 4 | 12:55 | SU | Andre Szmyt 23-yard field goal | SU 23–0 |
| 4 | 6:16 | FSU | Deondre Francois 2-yard run (Ricky Aguayo kick) | SU 23–7 |
| 4 | 3:19 | FSU | Dontae Strickland 13-yard run (Andre Szmyt kick) | SU 30–7 |

=== UConn ===
UConn at Syracuse

| Team | 1 | 2 | 3 | 4 | Total |
|---|---|---|---|---|---|
| Huskies | 7 | 7 | 0 | 7 | 21 |
| • Orange | 24 | 7 | 10 | 10 | 51 |

- Date: September 22
- Location:
  Carrier Dome
  Syracuse, NY
- Game start: 4:00 p.m. EDT
- Game attendance: 36,632

Scoring summary
| 1 | 09:15 | SU | Eric Dungey 2 yd run (Andre Szmyt kick) | SU 0–7 |
| 1 | 06:24 | SU | Eric Dungey 9 yd run (Andre Szmyt kick) | SU 0–14 |
| 1 | 03:53 | SU | Gabe Horan 7 yd pass from Eric Dungey (Andre Szmyt kick) | SU 0–21 |
| 1 | 03:43 | UCONN | David Pindell 75 yd run (Michael Tarbutt kick) | SU 7–21 |
| 1 | 01:52 | SU | Andre Szmyt 33 yd FG | SU 7–24 |
| 2 | 11:41 | UCONN | Zavier Scott 2 yd pass from David Pindell (Michael Tarbutt Kick) | SU 14–24 |
| 2 | 09:10 | SU | Eric Dungey 1 yd run (Andre Szmyt kick) | SU 14–31 |
| 3 | 10:35 | SU | Sean Riley 69 yd punt return (Andre Szmyt kick) | SU 14–38 |
| 3 | 04:27 | SU | Andre Szmyt 27 yd FG | SU 14–41 |
| 4 | 14:18 | UCONN | Tyler Davis 26 yd pass from Marvin Washington (Michael Tarbutt kick) | SU 21–41 |
| 4 | 11:21 | SU | Sean Riley 49 yd pass from Eric Dungey (Andre Szmyt kick) | SU 21–48 |
| 4 | 07:43 | SU | Andre Szmyt 25 yd FG | SU 21–51 |

=== At Clemson ===
Syracuse at Clemson

| Team | 1 | 2 | 3 | 4 | Total |
|---|---|---|---|---|---|
| Orange | 6 | 10 | 0 | 7 | 23 |
| • No. 3 Tigers | 7 | 0 | 6 | 14 | 27 |

- Date: September 29
- Location:
  Memorial Stadium
  Clemson, SC
- Game start: 12:00 p.m. EDT
- Game attendance: 80,121

Scoring summary
| 1 | 09:49 | SU | Andre Szmyt 35 yd FG | SU 3–0 |
| 1 | 08:26 | SU | Andre Szmyt 51 yd FG | SU 6–0 |
| 1 | 00:54 | CLEM | Travis Etienne 1 yd run (Greg Huegel kick) | CLEM 6–7 |
| 2 | 07:31 | SU | Eric Dungey 1 yd run (Andre Szmyt kick) | SU 13–7 |
| 2 | 00:24 | SU | Andre Szmyt 32 yd FG | SU 16–7 |
| 3 | 04:09 | CLEM | Greg Huegel 43 yd FG | SU 16–10 |
| 3 | 02:13 | CLEM | Greg Huegel 37 yd FG | SU 16–13 |
| 4 | 12:58 | SU | Eric Dungey 1 yd run (Andre Szmyt kick) | SU 23–13 |
| 4 | 11:08 | CLEM | Travis Etienne 26 yd run (Greg Huegel kick) | SU 23–20 |
| 4 | 00:41 | CLEM | Travis Etienne 2 yd run (Greg Huegel kick) | CLEM 23–27 |

=== At Pittsburgh ===
Syracuse at Pittsburgh

| Team | 1 | 2 | 3 | 4 | OT | Total |
|---|---|---|---|---|---|---|
| Orange | 14 | 3 | 14 | 6 | 0 | 37 |
| • Panthers | 14 | 6 | 7 | 10 | 7 | 44 |

- Date: October 6
- Location:
  Heinz Field
  Pittsburgh, PA
- Game start: 12:21 p.m. EDT
- Elapsed time: 4:31
- Game attendance: 37,100
- Game weather: 82°F • SW 8 • Mostly Sunny
- Referee: David Epperley
- TV announcers (Raycom):
  Play-by-Play: Tom Werme
  Analyst: Dave Archer
  Sideline: Lericia Harris

Scoring summary
| 1 | 10:54 | SU | Aaron Hackett 1 yard pass from Eric Dungey (Andre Szmyt kick) | SU 7–0 |
| 1 | 6:32 | SU | Jarveon Howard 2 yard TD run (Andre Szmyt kick) | SU 14–0 |
| 1 | 5:47 | PITT | Qadree Ollison 69 yard TD run (Alex Kessman Kick) | SU 14–7 |
| 1 | 4:21 | PITT | Dane Jackson 35 yard fumble return for TD (Alex Kessman Kick) | TIED 14–14 |
| 2 | 12:26 | PITT | Alex Kessman 54 yard field goal | PITT 14–17 |
| 2 | 6:50 | PITT | Alex Kessman 55 yard field goal | PITT 14–20 |
| 2 | 1:30 | SU | Andre Szmyt 33 yard field goal | PITT 17–20 |
| 3 | 14:12 | PITT | Rafael Araujo-Lopes 68 yard TD pass from Kenny Pickett (Alex Kessman Kick) | PITT 17–27 |
| 3 | 8:12 | SU | Jarveon Howard 5 yard TD run (Andre Szmyt Kick) | PITT 24–27 |
| 3 | 0:21 | SU | Eric Dungey 21 yard TD run (Andre Szmyt Kick) | SU 31–27 |
| 4 | 11:11 | SU | Andre Szmyt 29 yard field goal | SU 34–27 |
| 4 | 7:51 | PITT | Darrin Hall 7 yard TD run (Alex Kessman Kick) | TIED 34–34 |
| 4 | 5:53 | SU | Andre Szmyt 54 yard field goal | SU 37–34 |
| 4 | 0:08 | PITT | Alex Kessman 45 yard field goal | TIED 37–37 |
| OT | | PITT | Darrin Hall 3 yard TD run (Alex Kessman kick ) | PITT 37–44 |

=== North Carolina ===
North Carolina at Syracuse

| Team | 1 | 2 | 3 | 4 | OT | 2OT | Total |
|---|---|---|---|---|---|---|---|
| Tar Heels | 7 | 0 | 17 | 3 | 7 | 3 | 37 |
| • Orange | 0 | 13 | 7 | 7 | 7 | 6 | 40 |

- Date: October 6
- Location:
  Carrier Dome
  Syracuse, NY
- Game start: 12:20 p.m. EDT
- Elapsed time: 4:07
- Game attendance: 35,210
- Television network: Raycom

Scoring summary
| 1 | 10:07 | NC | Newsome, D 6 yard pass from Elliott, N (Jones, F kick) | NC 7–0 |
| 2 | 10:58 | SU | Szmyt, A. 25 yardd field goal | NC 7–3 |
| 2 | 1:56 | SU | Elmore, C. 1 yard run (Szmyt, A. kick) | SU 7–10 |
| 2 | 0:00 | SU | Szmyt, A. 46 yard field goal | SU 7–13 |
| 3 | 14:06 | SU | Dungey, E. 16 yard run (Szmyt, A. kick) | SU 7–20 |
| 3 | 10:52 | NC | Williams, A. 12 yard run (Jones, F kick) | SU 14–20 |
| 3 | 6:02 | NC | Newsome, D. 75 yard punt return (Jones, F kick) | NC 21–20 |
| 3 | 0:06 | NC | Jones, F. 34 yard field goal | NC 24–20 |
| 4 | 10:15 | NC | Jones, F. 25 yard field goal | PITT 27–20 |
| 4 | 1:39 | SU | Johnson, N. 42 yard pass from DeVito, T. (Szmyt, A. kick) | TIED 27–27 |
| OT | | SU | Custis, J. 25 yard pass from DeVito, T. (Szmyt, A. kick) | SU 34–27 |
| OT | | NC | Corrales, B. 9 yard pass from Elliott, N. (Jones, F. kick) | TIED 34–34 |
| OT2 | | NC | Jones, F. 48 yard field goal | NC 37–34 |
| OT2 | | SU | Pierce, R. 4 yard pass from DeVito, T. | SU 37–40 |

=== NC State ===
| | 1 | 2 | 3 | 4 | Total |
|---|---|---|---|---|---|
| No. 22 Wolfpack | 7 | 13 | 7 | 14 | 41 |
| Orange | 24 | 3 | 14 | 10 | 51 |

=== At Wake Forest ===
| | 1 | 2 | 3 | 4 | Total |
|---|---|---|---|---|---|
| No. 22 Orange | 14 | 7 | 14 | 6 | 41 |
| Demon Deacons | 10 | 0 | 14 | 0 | 24 |

=== Louisville ===
| | 1 | 2 | 3 | 4 | Total |
|---|---|---|---|---|---|
| Cardinals | 0 | 7 | 7 | 9 | 23 |
| No. 13 Orange | 7 | 30 | 7 | 10 | 54 |

=== Vs. Notre Dame ===
| | 1 | 2 | 3 | 4 | Total |
|---|---|---|---|---|---|
| No. 3 Fighting Irish | 13 | 7 | 9 | 7 | 36 |
| No. 12 Orange | 0 | 0 | 0 | 3 | 3 |

=== At Boston College ===
| | 1 | 2 | 3 | 4 | Total |
|---|---|---|---|---|---|
| No. 19 Orange | 14 | 14 | 7 | 7 | 42 |
| Eagles | 7 | 7 | 7 | 0 | 21 |

=== Vs. West Virginia (Camping World Bowl) ===
| | 1 | 2 | 3 | 4 | Total |
|---|---|---|---|---|---|
| No. 15 Mountaineers | 3 | 9 | 6 | 0 | 18 |
| No. 17 Orange | 7 | 7 | 3 | 17 | 34 |

== 2019 NFL draft ==
| Round | Pick | Player | Position | NFL Club |
|---|---|---|---|---|
| 7 | 245 | Chris Slayton | DT | New York Giants |
