= Cam Glenn =

American gridiron football player (born 1996)

Profile
- Position: Defensive back

Personal information
- Born: March 12, 1996 (age 30); Stone Mountain, Georgia, U.S.
- Listed height: 6 ft 1 in (1.85 m)
- Listed weight: 205 lb (93 kg)

Career information
- College: Wake Forest

Career history
- 2019: San Francisco 49ers*
- 2019–2022: Toronto Argonauts
- * Offseason or practice squad member only
- Stats at CFL.ca

Cameron Glenn (born March 12, 1996) is an American former professional football defensive back. He played college football for the Wake Forest Demon Deacons.

== College career ==
After graduating from Stephenson High School in Stone Mountain, Georgia, Glenn chose to play college football at Wake Forest University. After redshirting his freshman season in 2014, Glenn went on to play in 42 games over the next four years, in which he intercepted four passes, forced four fumbles, and made 269 tackles, 11.5 of which were for a loss.

Glenn graduated with a degree in Communication and Media Studies.

=== College statistics ===
Year	Team	GP	Tackles			Interceptions		Fumbles
Year	Team	GP	TOT	TFL	SACK	PD	INT	FF
2015	Wake Forest	9	38	0.5	0.0	1	1	0
2016	Wake Forest	8	35	1.0	0.0	0	1	1
2017	Wake Forest	13	98	3.5	0.0	6	2	1
2018	Wake Forest	12	98	6.5	2.5	4	0	2
Total		42	269	11.5	2.5	11	4	4

== Professional career ==
=== San Francisco 49ers ===
After going unselected in 2019 NFL draft, Glenn was signed by the San Francisco 49ers as an undrafted free agent on April 27, 2019. On May 15, Glenn was released by the team.

=== Toronto Argonauts ===
On October 22, 2019, Glenn was signed by the Toronto Argonauts to their practice roster. Glenn saw action in the team’s penultimate game that week against the Ottawa Redblacks. The 2020 CFL season was cancelled, and Glenn did not play in the 2021 season due to injury. He was released from the team on May 24, 2022.
