= Clover High School =

Location
- 1625 Highway 55 East; Clover, South Carolina 29710; United States; 35°6′44″N 81°13′37″W

Information
- School type: Public, high school
- School district: Clover School District
- Superintendent: Sheila Quinn
- NCES School ID: 450384001129
- Principal: Donna Farris
- Teaching staff: 177.00 (FTE)
- Grades: 9–12
- Enrollment: 2,698 (2023–2024)
- Language: English
- Colors: Blue and gray
- Athletics conference: South Carolina High School League AAAAA Region IV
- Nickname: Blue Eagles
- Rival: York Comprehensive High School
- Website: www.clover.k12.sc.us/o/chs

Clover High School is a public high school located in Clover, South Carolina, United States, about 28 miles from Charlotte. It is the only high school in the Clover School District. As of the 2024-2025 school year, the principal is Donna Farris. Clover's feeder schools are Oakridge Middle School and Clover Middle School. The Pride of Clover Marching Band performed in the 2026 Rose Parade and its Bandfest in Pasadena, California.

== Choir ==
The 100+ member school choir, the Clover High School Choraliers, have won the State Championship ten times at the South Carolina Choral Concert Festival.

== Athletics ==
- Girls' Tennis 2003 3A State Champions
- Football 2007 4A Division 2 State Champions
- Softball 2015 4A State Champions
- Boys' Soccer 2016 4A State Finalist
- Girls' Basketball 2021 State Champions
- Chris Cobb - Running Back with the best ever performance as a Clover High School Athlete

 Football and Basketball

== Notable alumni ==
- Lamont Hall, NFL tight end
- Herbert Kirsh, member of South Carolina House of Representatives, 1979–2010
- Jaylin Lane, wide receiver and return specialist
- Nick Sciba, NFL kicker
