= Robert Alexander Webb =

Robert Alexander Webb (21 September 1856 – 23 May 1919) was an American Presbyterian minister and theologian.

Webb was born in Oxford, Mississippi and was ordained a minister in the Presbyterian Church in the United States in 1883, serving as minister of Bethel Presbyterian Church in Clover, South Carolina. He became Professor of Systematic Theology at Southwestern Presbyterian University in 1892, and Professor of Systematic Theology at Louisville Presbyterian Theological Seminary in 1908, where he served until his death.

Webb wrote many books, most notably The Reformed Doctrine of Adoption (Eerdmans, 1947). Along with Charles Hodge and B. B. Warfield, Webb believed in universal infant salvation.

Webb's father-in-law was John Girardeau.
