= Bethel Presbyterian Church (Clover, South Carolina) =

Historic church in South Carolina, United States

- U.S. National Register of Historic Places
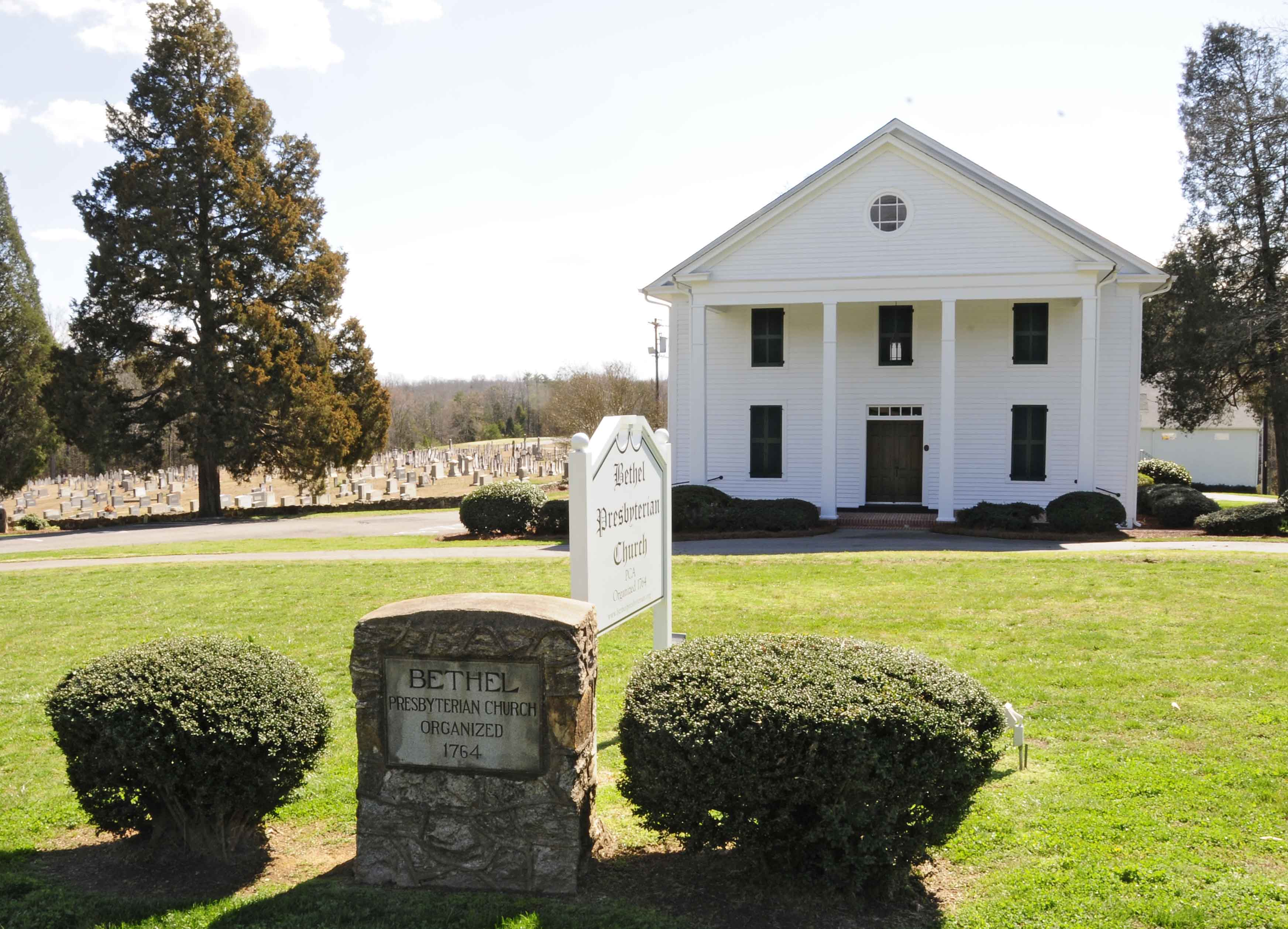

- Location within South Carolina Location within the United States
- Nearest city: Clover, South Carolina
- Coordinates: 35°6′41″N 81°9′11″W
- Area: 7 acres (2.8 ha)
- Built: 1873
- NRHP reference No.: 80003714
- Added to NRHP: December 10, 1980

Bethel Presbyterian Church is a historic Presbyterian church near Clover, South Carolina.

It was founded in 1764 in York County, which was part of North Carolina in 1764. On July 1, 1973, Bethel Presbyterian Church voted unanimously to withdraw from the Presbyterian Church US (PCUS) and join a new group, the Presbyterian Church in America (PCA).

Robert A. Webb was the pastor from 1882 to 1887.

== Architecture ==
The current church building was constructed in 1873, immediately adjacent to the earlier church, which was torn down. The current structure was added to the National Register of Historic Places in 1980. The church, a local interpretation of a colonial meeting house. The heavy post and beam, hand-hewn, wooden pegged construction is unusual for so late in the century, especially when lighter, more rapid assembled methods were in common use. The king post truss used in Bethel's roof structure is an ancient design found in some of America's earliest churches. Bethel represents an architectural achievement during a time of political and social upheaval and economic adversity that marked the Reconstruction era. Bethel's congregation constructed a commodious house of worship under severely reduced circumstances, doing so without incurring debt. A large well-tended cemetery covers three acres of a ridge on the property's east side. Enclosed by a stone wall, it contained some three to four thousand graves in 1887. _ Adopted from the South Carolina Department of Archives and History National Register Properties in South Carolina
