= Clover Downtown Historic District =

Historic district in South Carolina, United States

- U.S. National Register of Historic Places
- U.S. Historic district
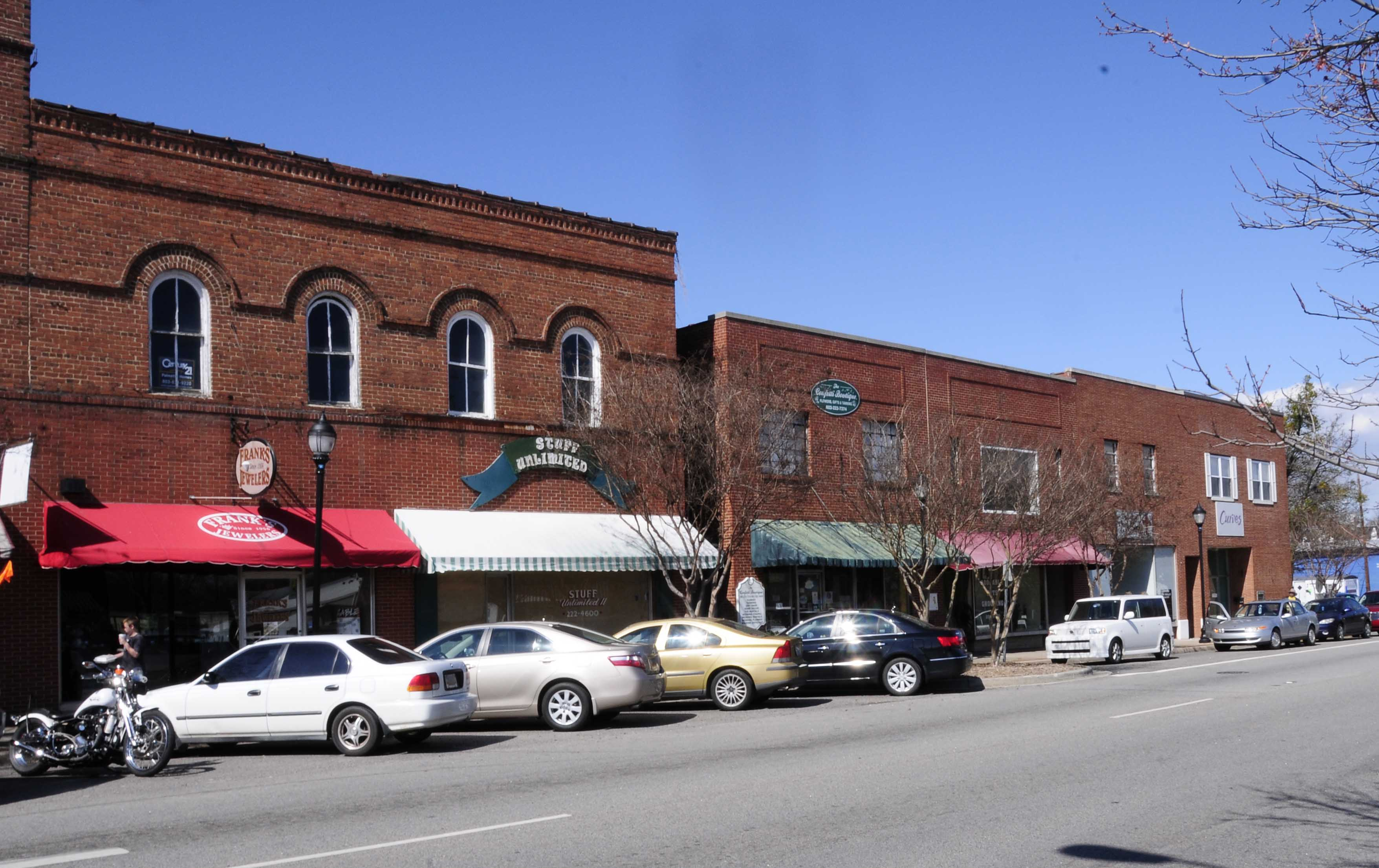
- Clover Downtown Historic District, March 2012

- Location within South Carolina Location within the United States
- Location: Jct. of Main and Kings Mountain Sts., Clover, South Carolina
- Coordinates: 35°6′42″N 81°13′36″W
- Area: 6 acres (2.4 ha)
- Built: 1884
- Architectural style: Late Victorian, Late 19th And 20th Century Revivals
- NRHP reference No.: 99000816
- Added to NRHP: July 8, 1999

Clover Downtown Historic District is a national historic district located at Clover, York County, South Carolina. It encompasses 14 contributing buildings in the central business district of Clover. The buildings are predominantly one to three-story masonry commercial buildings built between the mid-1880s and about 1935.

It was added to the National Register of Historic Places in 1999.
