= 2018 Camping World Bowl =

American college football game

- 29th Camping World Bowl
West Virginia Mountaineers	Syracuse Orange
(8–3)	(9–3)
Big 12	ACC
18	34
Head coach: Dana Holgorsen	Head coach: Dino Babers
AP / Coaches / CFP; 15 / 16 / 16	AP / Coaches / CFP; 17 / 17 / 20
	1	2	3	4	Total
West Virginia	3	9	6	0	18
Syracuse	7	7	3	17	34
- Date: December 28, 2018
- Season: 2018
- Stadium: Camping World Stadium
- Location: Orlando, Florida
- MVP: Eric Dungey (QB, Syracuse)
- Favorite: West Virginia by 1.5
- Referee: Steve Strimling (Pac-12)
- Attendance: 41,125

United States TV coverage
- Network: ESPN & ESPN Radio
- Announcers: Dave Flemming, Rod Gilmore and Quint Kessenich (ESPN); Dave LaMont, John Congemi and Molly McGrath (ESPN Radio)

The 2018 Camping World Bowl was a college football bowl game played on December 28, 2018, between the West Virginia Mountaineers and the Syracuse Orange. It was the 29th edition of the Camping World Bowl, and one of the 2018–19 bowl games concluding the 2018 FBS football season. The game was sponsored by the recreational vehicle company Camping World.

== Teams ==
The game was played between West Virginia from the Big 12 Conference and Syracuse from the Atlantic Coast Conference (ACC). Syracuse and West Virginia had long standing rivalry both as Independents and as members of the Big East Conference. This was the 61st time the two programs had met; Syracuse held a 33–27 series lead in prior games.

=== West Virginia Mountaineers ===
West Virginia received and accepted a bid to the Camping World Bowl on December 2. The Mountaineers entered the bowl with an 8–3 record (6–3 in conference). Quarterback Will Grier, tackle Yodny Cajuste, and wide receiver Gary Jennings announced that they would sit out the game in order to prepare for the 2019 NFL draft.

=== Syracuse Orange ===
Syracuse received and accepted a bid to the Camping World Bowl on December 2. The Orange entered the bowl with a 9–3 record (6–2 in conference). Syracuse also entered the game short-handed, as defensive end Alton Robinson, defensive tackle McKinley Williams, and defensive back Antwan Cordy all missed the game for personal reasons.

== Game summary ==
=== Scoring summary ===
Scoring summary

Quarter	Time	Drive			Team	Scoring information	Score	
Quarter	Time	Plays	Yards	TOP	Team	Scoring information	WVU	CUSE
1	6:42	10	45	4:52	WVU	28-yard field goal by Evan Staley	3	0
1	3:01	10	91	3:41	CUSE	Abdul Adams 4-yard touchdown run, Andre Szmyt kick good	3	7
2	13:52	4	16	1:08	WVU	Kennedy McKoy 3-yard touchdown run, Evan Staley kick no good	9	7
2	8:30	6	62	1:50	CUSE	Abdul Adams 1-yard touchdown run, Andre Szmyt kick good	9	14
2	6:33	5	56	1:57	WVU	36-yard field goal by Evan Staley	12	14
3	10:11	9	48	4:49	WVU	44-yard field goal by Evan Staley	15	14
3	6:16	10	57	3:55	CUSE	39-yard field goal by Andre Szmyt	15	17
3	3:23	10	55	2:53	WVU	49-yard field goal by Evan Staley	18	17
4	14:54	11	75	3:29	CUSE	Trishton Jackson 14-yard touchdown reception from Eric Dungey, Andre Szmyt kick good	18	24
4	12:55	5	2	1:49	CUSE	34-yard field goal by Andre Szmyt	18	27
4	9:59	4	58	1:37	CUSE	Jarveon Howard 4-yard touchdown run, Andre Szmyt kick good	18	34
"TOP" = time of possession. For other American football terms, see Glossary of American football.							18	34

=== Statistics ===
	1	2	3	4	Total
No. 16 Mountaineers	3	9	6	0	18
No. 20 Orange	7	7	3	17	34

Statistics	WVU	CUSE
First downs	18	24
Plays–yards	74–423	73–418
Rushes–yards	36–146	43–115
Passing yards	277	303
Passing: comp–att–int	19–38–1	21–30–2
Time of possession	29:32	30:28

Team	Category	Player	Statistics
West Virginia	Passing	Jack Allison	17/35, 277 yds, 1 INT
West Virginia	Rushing	Kennedy McKoy	17 car, 73 yds, 1 TD
West Virginia	Receiving	David Sills V	4 rec, 90 yds
Syracuse	Passing	Eric Dungey	21/30, 303 yds, 1 TD, 2 INT
Syracuse	Rushing	Moe Neal	8 car, 42 yds
Syracuse	Receiving	Jamal Custis	5 rec, 80 yds
