= Robert Webb (cricketer, born 1806) =

English cricketer and Anglican priest

Personal information
- Full name: Robert Holden Webb
- Born: 22 February 1806; Ham Common, Surrey
- Died: 10 March 1880 (aged 74); Essendon, Hertfordshire

Domestic team information
- Years: Team
- 1826–1827: Cambridge University
- Source: CricketArchive, 23 June 2013

Robert Holden Webb (22 February 1806 – 10 March 1880) was an English cricketer with amateur status, later an Anglican priest.

Webb was educated at Eton College and then Christ's College, Cambridge. He is recorded as playing for Cambridge University in three matches from 1826 to 1827, totalling 24 runs with a highest score of 10 and holding no catches. He was ordained as a Church of England priest in 1830 and was rector of Essendon from 1844 until his death.

== Bibliography ==
- Haygarth, Arthur (1996) [1862]. Scores & Biographies, Volume 1 (1744–1826). Kennington: Frederick Lillywhite. ISBN 978-19-00592-23-9.
- Haygarth, Arthur (1997) [1862]. Scores & Biographies, Volume 2 (1827–1840). Kennington: Frederick Lillywhite. ISBN 978-19-00592-23-9.
