= Robert Webb (rugby union) =

England international rugby union player

- Full name: James William George Webb
- Born: 17 October 1900 Upton, Northampton, England
- Died: 19 August 1970 (aged 69) Daventry, Northants, England

Rugby union career
- Position: Lock / No. 8
International career
Years	Team	Apps	(Points)
1926–29	England	3	(3)

James William George Webb (17 October 1900 – 19 August 1970) was an English international rugby union player.

Born in Upton, Northampton, Webb took up rugby after the war, starting out in the Northampton "A" team. He took a while to establish himself and wasn't a regular in the Northampton firsts until the 1924–25 season. A sizeable forward, Webb possessed enough pace to be dangerous on the loose and was a good scrummager. He represented the East Midlands and gained three caps for England, across the 1926 and 1929 Five Nations.

Webb married the sister-in-law of England footballer Fanny Walden.

During World War II, Webb served with the Observer Corps.

== See also ==
- List of England national rugby union players
