= Eric Dungey =

American football player (born 1996)

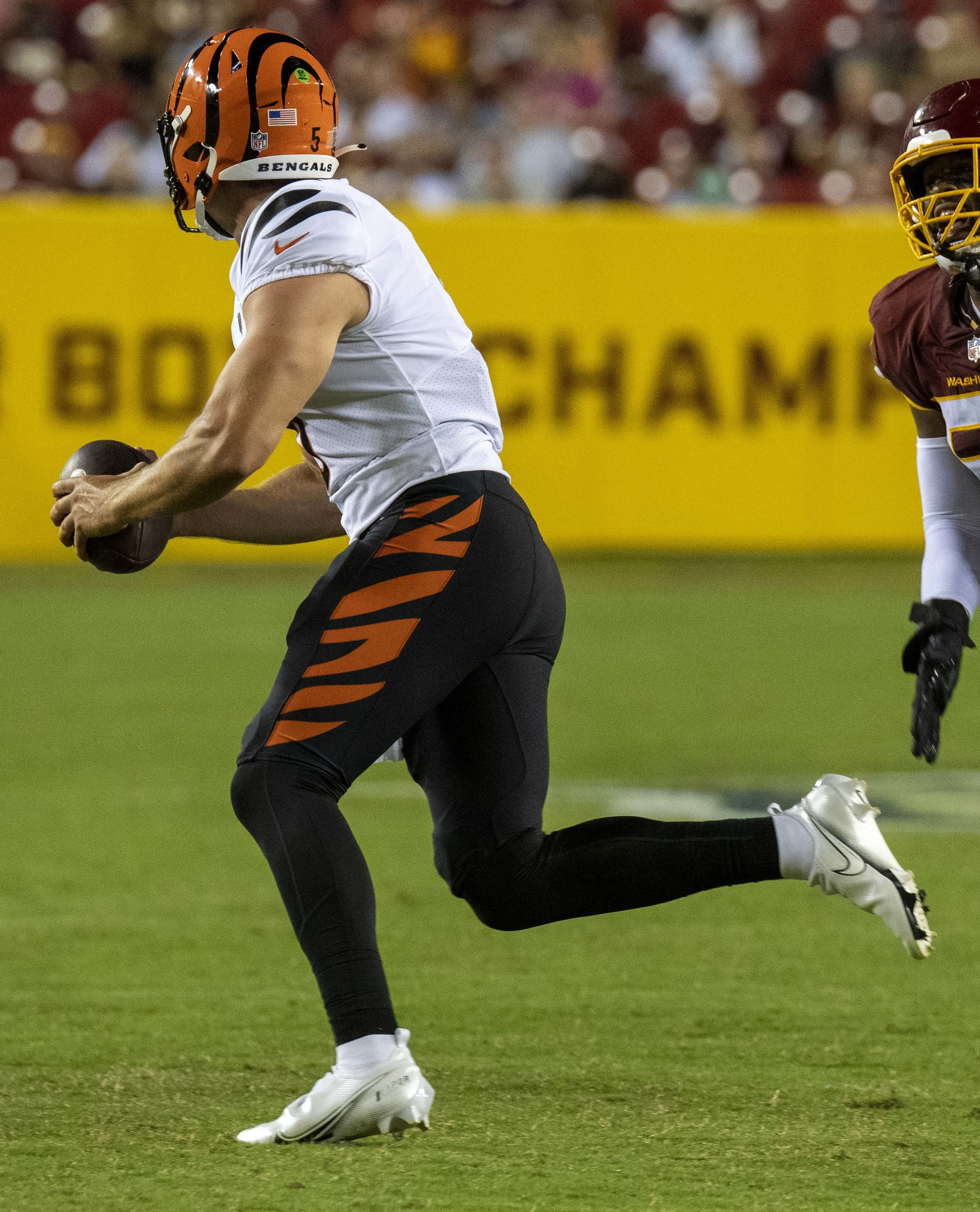
- Dungey with the Cincinnati Bengals in 2021

No. 2, 7
- Position: Quarterback

Personal information
- Born: June 12, 1996 (age 30); Tualatin, Oregon, U.S.
- Listed height: 6 ft 4 in (1.93 m)
- Listed weight: 226 lb (103 kg)

Career information
- High school: Lakeridge (Lake Oswego, Oregon)
- College: Syracuse (2015–2018)
- NFL draft: 2019: undrafted

Career history
- New York Giants (2019)*; Cleveland Browns (2019)*; Dallas Renegades (2020); Cincinnati Bengals (2021)*; DC Defenders (2023)
- * Offseason or practice squad member only

Awards and highlights
- Third-team All-ACC (2018); ECAC Offensive Player of the Year (2018)
- Stats at Pro Football Reference

Eric Jay Paul Dungey (born June 12, 1996) is an American former professional football quarterback. He played college football for the Syracuse Orange.

== Early life ==
Dungey attended Lakeridge High School in Lake Oswego, Oregon. As a senior, he threw for 2395 yards and 22 touchdowns. He was a three-star recruit and committed to Syracuse University to play college football.

== College career ==
Dungey played eight games in 2015, completing 105 of 176 passes for 1298 yards and 11 touchdowns. He suffered a concussion in game 3 of his freshman season.

During his sophomore season in 2016, Dungey completed 230 of 355 passes for 2679 yards with 15 touchdowns in nine games before suffering a season-ending head injury.

During his junior year in 2017, Dungey completed 225 of 377 passes for 2495 yards and 14 touchdowns in nine games. He threw for 276 yards and 3 touchdowns in an upset victory over No. 2 Clemson. He later suffered a season-ending leg injury against Florida State.

During his senior year in 2018, he completed 226 of 371 passes for 2868 yards, 18 touchdowns, and nine interceptions. During the 2018 Camping World Bowl, he threw for 303 yards and a touchdown against West Virginia and won MVP. He broke a school record previously held by Ryan Nassib for most passing yards in a career during the bowl game.

=== College statistics ===
Season	Team	Games	Passing									Rushing		
Season	Team	Games	Comp	Att	Yards	Avg	Pct.	TD	Int	QB rating	Att	Yards	Avg	TD
2015	Syracuse	8	105	176	1,298	7.4	61.5	11	5	136.6	91	397	3.9	5
2016	Syracuse	9	230	355	2,679	7.5	64.8	15	7	138.2	125	595	4.2	6
2017	Syracuse	9	225	377	2,844	6.6	59.7	14	9	122.8	143	595	2.3	9
2018	Syracuse	13	226	371	2,686	7.7	60.9	18	9	137.0	184	754	4.1	15
Career		39	786	1279	9,340	7.3	61.7	58	30	133.1	543	1993	3.7	35

== Professional career ==
Pre-draft measurables
Height	Weight	Arm length	Hand span	40-yard dash	10-yard split	20-yard split	20-yard shuttle	Three-cone drill	Vertical jump	Broad jump	Bench press
6 ft 4 in (1.93 m)	235 lb (107 kg)	31 3/4 in (0.81 m)	9 1/2 in (0.24 m)	4.78 s	1.67 s	2.83 s	4.50 s	7.02 s	31.5 in (0.80 m)	9 ft 6 in (2.90 m)	22 reps
All values from the Syracuse Pro Day

=== New York Giants ===
Following the conclusion of the 2019 NFL draft, Dungey signed with the New York Giants as an undrafted free agent on May 2, 2019. He was listed on the Giants roster as a quarterback and a tight end. Dungey was waived by New York on July 24.

=== Cleveland Browns ===
On October 11, 2019, Dungey was signed to the Cleveland Browns practice squad. He was released by the Browns on December 19.

=== Dallas Renegades ===
On January 8, 2020, Dungey was assigned to the Dallas Renegades of the XFL following an injury to quarterback Landry Jones. On February 11, he was placed on the reserve/left squad list for personal reasons. Dungey was activated from the left squad list on February 19. He was placed on the reserve/left squad list again on February 24, after the death of his father. Dungey was activated again on March 2. He had his contract terminated when the league suspended operations on April 10.

=== Cincinnati Bengals ===
On May 14, 2021, Dungey signed with the Cincinnati Bengals. He was waived by Cincinnati on August 22.

=== DC Defenders ===
On November 15, 2022, Dungey was assigned to the DC Defenders of the XFL. He was placed on the team's reserve list on April 17, 2023. Dungey was removed from the team's reserve list on May 2.

== Personal life ==
His father, Tim, was diagnosed with cancer in May 2019. New York businessman Adam Weitsman sold his suite for the Syracuse vs Clemson game in 2019 to raise money for Dungey's father. Tim Dungey died on February 21, 2020.
