= Clover, South Carolina =

- Town
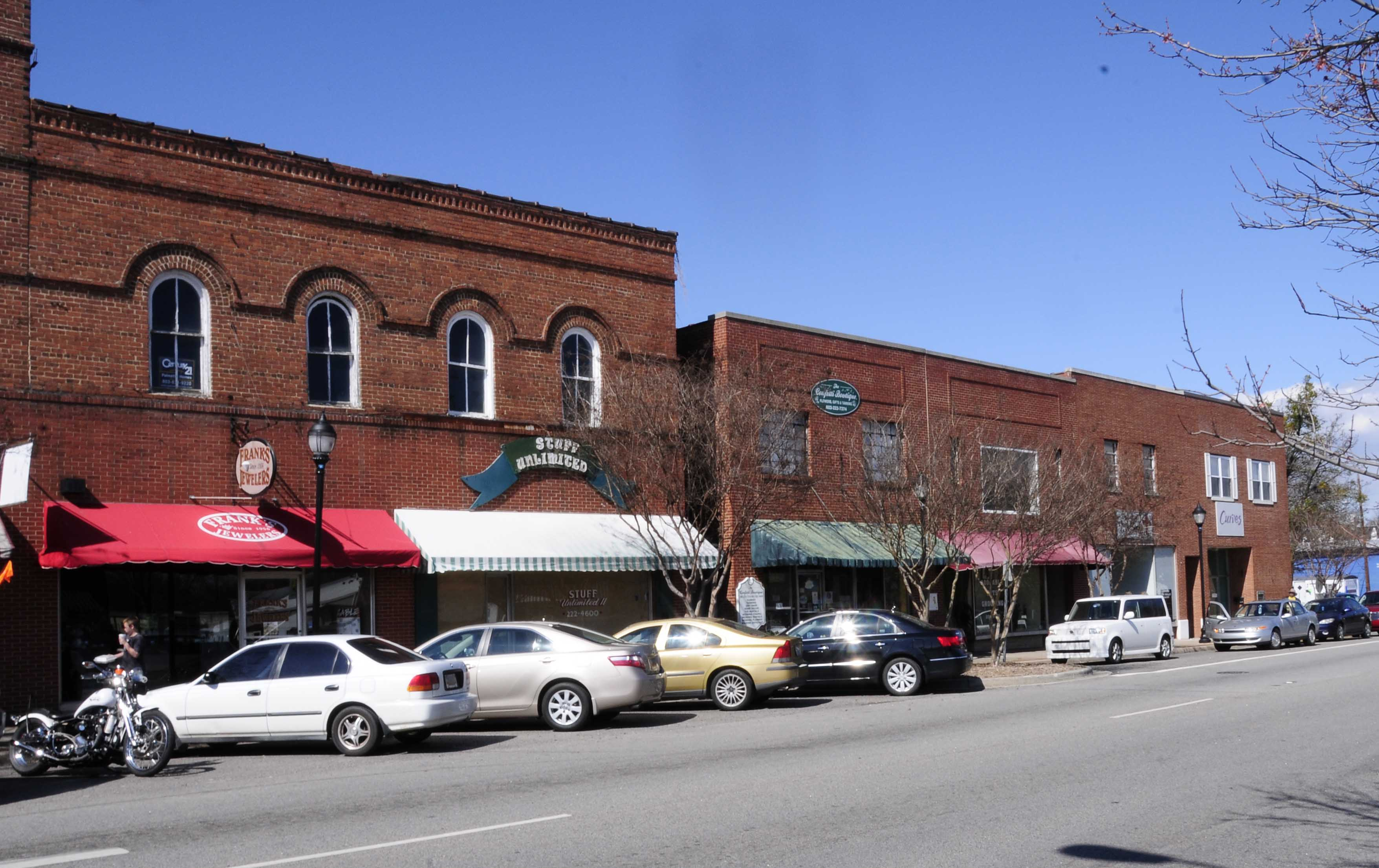
- Clover Downtown Historic District

- Seal
- Motto: "The town with love in the middle."
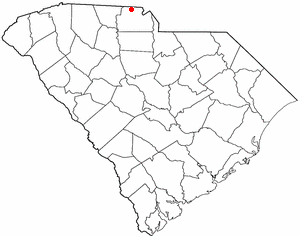
- Location of Clover, South Carolina
- Coordinates: 35°07′20″N 81°13′09″W
- Country: United States
- State: South Carolina
- County: York

Area
  - Total: 4.74 sq mi (12.28 km^{2})
  - Land: 4.73 sq mi (12.25 km^{2})
  - Water: 0.012 sq mi (0.03 km^{2})
- Elevation: 794 ft (242 m)

Population (2020)
  - Total: 6,671
  - Density: 1,410.6/sq mi (544.65/km^{2})
- Time zone: UTC-5 (Eastern (EST))
  - Summer (DST): UTC-4 (EDT)
- ZIP code: 29710
- Area code: 803
- FIPS code: 45-15355
- GNIS feature ID: 2406283
- Website: www.cloversc.org

Clover is a town in York County, South Carolina, United States. It is located in the greater Charlotte metropolitan area. As of 2020, the population was at 6,671 within the town limits. Clover is twinned with the Northern Irish town of Larne on County Antrim's East Coast.

== History ==
Clover was founded just north of an earlier settlement, New Centre, which had waned during the Civil War. The pivotal American Revolutionary War battle of Kings Mountain occurred approximately eight miles to the west of modern-day Clover, on October 7, 1780.

Prior to Clover's founding, Bethany and Bethel, communities to the west and east, respectively, were primary population centers in northern York District, with well-established Presbyterian churches, post offices and stores serving the area's numerous cotton farms.

The village of Clover began as a railway stop in 1876, midway between Yorkville, and modern-day Gastonia, North Carolina, when the first railroad tracks were laid through the northern section of the county.

Before the Civil War, the Kings Mountain Railroad had operated as far north as Yorkville from Chester, but the tracks were destroyed during the war. In 1873, the Chester and Lenoir Narrow Gauge Railroad was officially chartered and acquired the Kings Mountain rights of way. By 1875, new, narrow-gauge railway replaced the remnants of the former Kings Mountain line, and the following year the tracks were extended from Yorkville to Gaston County, North Carolina. A water tank for the railway's steam locomotives was constructed midway between Gastonia and Yorkville.

According to lore, the overflow of water from the railway's water tank fertilized a patch of clover, and the stop was called "the clover patch." The town was officially incorporated in 1887.

It later became the home of several cotton mills, many of which operated until after World War II.

The Bethel Presbyterian Church and Clover Downtown Historic District are listed on the National Register of Historic Places.

== Geography and climate ==
According to the United States Census Bureau, the town has a total area of 4.558 square miles (11.81 km^{2}), of which 4.547 square miles (11.78 km^{2}) is land and 0.011 square miles (0.028 km^{2}) is water.

U.S. Highway 321 comprises Clover's Main Street, which runs roughly north and south, and the town square lies at its intersection with state highway 55.

Henry's Knob, a mountain west of Clover, is the site of a former open-pit mining operation for what was formerly the world's largest deposit of kyanite. The mountain stands at 1120 ft above sea level. According to United States Environmental Protection Agency (EPA) records, the mine is listed as a Superfund Alternative Site for acid mine drainage and groundwater contamination.

== Demographics ==
Historical population
Census	Pop.	Note	%±
1880	73		—
1890	287		293.2%
1900	961		234.8%
1910	1,207		25.6%
1920	1,608		33.2%
1930	3,111		93.5%
1940	3,067		−1.4%
1950	3,276		6.8%
1960	3,500		6.8%
1970	3,506		0.2%
1980	3,451		−1.6%
1990	3,422		−0.8%
2000	4,014		17.3%
2010	5,094		26.9%
2020	6,671		31.0%
2025 (est.)	7,659	▲	14.8%
U.S. Decennial Census

=== 2020 census ===
Clover racial composition
Race	Num.	Perc.
White (non-Hispanic)	4,545	68.13%
Black or African American (non-Hispanic)	1,142	17.12%
Native American	27	0.4%
Asian	64	0.96%
Other/Mixed	403	6.04%
Hispanic or Latino	490	7.35%

As of the 2020 United States census, there were 6,671 people, 2,093 households, and 1,527 families residing in the town.

=== 2000 census ===
As of the census of 2000, there were 4,014 people, 1,517 households, and 1,099 families residing in the town. The population density was 1,433.5 inhabitants per square mile (553.5/km^{2}). There were 1,635 housing units at an average density of 583.9 units per square mile (225.4 units/km^{2}). The racial makeup of the town was 75.96% White, 21.03% African American, 0.27% Native American, 0.45% Asian, 0.07% Pacific Islander, 1.30% from other races, and 0.92% from two or more races. Hispanic or Latino of any race were 1.94% of the population.

There were 1,517 households, out of which 35.7% had children under the age of 18 living with them, 48.2% were married couples living together, 19.6% had a female householder with no husband present, and 27.5% were non-families. 24.1% of all households were made up of individuals, and 10.9% had someone living alone who was 65 years of age or older. The average household size was 2.64 and the average family size was 3.12.

In the town, the population was spread out, with 28.9% under the age of 18, 7.6% from 18 to 24, 29.7% from 25 to 44, 20.9% from 45 to 64, and 12.8% who were 65 years of age or older. The median age was 34 years. For every 100 females, there were 90.6 males. For every 100 females age 18 and over, there were 85.1 males.

The median income for a household in the town was $37,335, and the median income for a family was $43,276. Males had a median income of $33,945 versus $19,840 for females. The per capita income for the town was $16,774. About 13.4% of families and 15.8% of the population were below the poverty line, including 19.5% of those under age 18 and 13.4% of those age 65 or over.

== Education ==
The schools located in the Clover School District include Bethel Elementary School, Bethany Elementary School, Griggs Road Elementary School, Kinard Elementary School, Crowders Creek Elementary School, Larne Elementary School (named after Clover's Sister City), Oakridge Elementary School Clover Middle School, Oakridge Middle School, Blue Eagle Academy, and Clover High School.

Clover has a public library, a branch of the York County Library.

== Local recreation ==
- Clover Community Park
- New Centre Park
- Roosevelt Park
- Crowder's Mountain State Park
- Kings Mountain State Park
- Field Day Park

== International relations ==
Clover is twinned with:

- Larne, County Antrim, Northern Ireland, United Kingdom
