= National Register of Historic Places listings in York County, South Carolina =

Location of York County in South Carolina

York County, South Carolina, United States, has 63 properties and districts listed on the National Register of Historic Places. The city of Rock Hill is the location of 28 of these properties and districts; for these see National Register of Historic Places listings in Rock Hill, South Carolina.

The locations of National Register properties and districts for which the latitude and longitude coordinates are included below may be seen on a map.

This National Park Service list is complete through NPS recent listings posted August 7, 2026.

== Current listings ==
	Name on the Register	Image	Date listed	Location	City or town	Description
1	Allison Plantation	Allison Plantation	September 29, 1980 (#80003716)	Off South Carolina Highways 40 and 60; 35°00′08″N 81°22′32″W	York	
2	Banks-Mack House	Banks-Mack House	June 11, 1992 (#92000643)	329 Confederate St. 35°00′11″N 80°56′18″W	Fort Mill	
3	Bethel Presbyterian Church	Bethel Presbyterian Church	December 10, 1980 (#80003714)	South Carolina Highway 557; 35°06′41″N 81°09′11″W	Clover	
4	Bethesda Presbyterian Church	Bethesda Presbyterian Church	August 16, 1977 (#77001233)	3.5 miles northeast of McConnells on South Carolina Highway 322; 34°53′52″N 81°10′32″W	McConnells	
5	Brattonsville Historic District	Brattonsville Historic District	August 19, 1971 (#71000812)	East of McConnells on County Road 165 off South Carolina Highway 322; 34°52′04″N 81°10′39″W	McConnells	
6	Carroll Rosenwald School	Carroll Rosenwald School	June 25, 2018 (#100002600)	4789 Mobley Store Rd. 34°51′06″N 81°09′34″W	Rock Hill	
7	Clover Downtown Historic District	Clover Downtown Historic District	July 8, 1999 (#99000816)	Junction of Main and Kings Mountain Sts. 35°06′42″N 81°13′36″W	Clover	
8	Fort Mill Downtown Historic District	Fort Mill Downtown Historic District	June 11, 1992 (#92000646)	Main St. from Confederate Park east to 233 Main; 35°00′28″N 80°56′39″W	Fort Mill	
9	Fort Mill Manufacturing Company Mill No. 2		May 19, 2025 (#100011847)	104 Williamson Street; 35°00′12″N 80°56′40″W	Fort Mill	
10	Hampshire Mill		May 18, 2026 (#100013003)	401 South Main Street; 35°06′23″N 81°13′49″W	Clover	
11	Hart House	Hart House	December 2, 1977 (#77001236)	220 E. Liberty St. 34°59′29″N 81°14′12″W	York	
12	Hightower Hall	Hightower Hall	June 28, 1982 (#82003907)	County Road 165; 34°52′52″N 81°10′53″W	McConnells	
13	Hill Complex Historic District	Hill Complex Historic District	April 18, 2003 (#03000273)	York and Shannon Sts. 34°57′09″N 81°20′12″W	Sharon	
14	W.L. Hill Store	W.L. Hill Store	January 20, 1995 (#94001572)	3034 York St. 34°57′05″N 81°20′18″W	Sharon	
15	Jackson's Furnace Site (38YK217)		May 8, 1987 (#87000706)	Address Restricted	Smyrna	
16	Kings Mountain National Military Park	Kings Mountain National Military Park	October 15, 1966 (#66000079)	Northwest of Bethany on South Carolina Highway 161; 35°08′16″N 81°23′22″W	Bethany	Extends into Cherokee County
17	Mack-Belk House	Mack-Belk House	June 11, 1992 (#92000647)	119 Banks St. 35°00′24″N 80°56′06″W	Fort Mill	
18	Mills House	Mills House	June 11, 1992 (#92000645)	122 Confederate St. 35°00′23″N 80°56′36″W	Fort Mill	
19	Nation Ford Road	Nation Ford Road	March 1, 2007 (#00000593)	5 noncontiguous sections of roadbed in Fort Mill; 34°59′43″N 80°57′06″W	Fort Mill	
20	National Guard Armory	National Guard Armory	June 11, 1992 (#92000648)	Junction of Elliott and Unity Sts. 35°00′34″N 80°56′21″W	Fort Mill	
21	Sadler Store	Sadler Store	October 16, 2017 (#100001749)	405 S. Congress St. 34°59′15″N 81°14′47″W	York	
22	St. James Rosenwald School		January 30, 2026 (#100012667)	1108 Hickory Street; 34°59′20″N 81°24′49″W	Hickory Grove	
23	Sharon Downtown Historic District	Sharon Downtown Historic District	November 2, 2001 (#01001202)	York St. and Woodlawn Ave. 34°57′06″N 81°20′30″W	Sharon	
24	Spratt Cemetery	Spratt Cemetery	March 1, 2007 (#00000597)	Brickyard Rd. 34°59′58″N 80°57′10″W	Fort Mill	
25	Springfield Plantation House	Springfield Plantation House	September 12, 1985 (#85002387)	U.S. Route 21; 35°02′54″N 80°55′41″W	Fort Mill	
26	Thornwell-Elliott House	Thornwell-Elliott House	June 11, 1992 (#92000644)	118 Confederate St. 35°00′24″N 80°56′37″W	Fort Mill	
27	Unity Presbyterian Church Complex	Unity Presbyterian Church Complex	June 11, 1992 (#92000649)	303 Tom Hall St. 35°00′33″N 80°56′16″W	Fort Mill	
28	John M. White House	John M. White House	September 12, 1985 (#85002385)	White and Skipper Sts. 35°00′36″N 80°56′50″W	Fort Mill	
29	William Elliott White House	William Elliott White House	March 22, 1987 (#87000381)	N. White St. 35°00′57″N 80°57′01″W	Fort Mill	
30	Wilson House	Wilson House	June 11, 1992 (#92000650)	107 Clebourne St. 35°00′31″N 80°56′38″W	Fort Mill	
31	Wilson House	Wilson House	November 20, 1974 (#74001887)	3 S. Congress St. 34°59′36″N 81°14′32″W	York	
32	Witherspoon-Hunter House	Witherspoon-Hunter House	February 7, 1978 (#78002536)	15 W. Liberty St. 34°59′50″N 81°14′37″W	York	
33	York County Courthouse	York County Courthouse	October 30, 1981 (#81000700)	Corner of W. Liberty and S. Congress Sts. 34°59′39″N 81°14′33″W	York	
34	York Graded School	York Graded School	May 23, 2023 (#100008988)	212 East Jefferson St. 34°59′25″N 81°14′23″W	York	
35	York Historic District	York Historic District	October 18, 1979 (#79002396)	U.S. Route 321 and South Carolina Highway 5; 34°59′53″N 81°13′35″W	York	

== See also ==
- List of National Historic Landmarks in South Carolina
- National Register of Historic Places listings in South Carolina
