= Banks House =

Banks House may refer to:

- Coleman-Banks House, Eutaw, Alabama, listed on the NRHP in Alabama
- Banks House (Hiwasse, Arkansas), listed on the NRHP in Arkansas
- Ralph Banks Place, Elberton, Georgia, listed on the NRHP in Georgia
- Gordon-Banks House, Newnan, Georgia, listed on the NRHP in Georgia
- Gale-Banks House, Waltham, Massachusetts, listed on the NRHP in Massachusetts
- E. Sybbill Banks House, Waltham, Massachusetts, listed on the NRHP in Massachusetts
- Harris-Banks House, Columbus, Mississippi, listed on the NRHP in Mississippi
- Jones-Banks-Leigh House, Columbus, Mississippi, listed on the NRHP in Mississippi
- Root-Banks House, Medford, Oregon, listed on the NRHP in Oregon
- Col. J. A. Banks House, St. Matthews, South Carolina, listed on the NRHP in South Carolina
- Banks-Mack House, Fort Mill, South Carolina, listed on the NRHP in South Carolina
- Banks-Ogg House, Lufkin, Texas, listed on the NRHP in Texas

== See also ==
- Bank House, Milford, Delaware, NRHP-listed
