= Bridgetree =

Bridgetree, Inc.
- Formerly: WIT Development, Inc.
- Founded: 1995
- Founder: Mark Beck
- Headquarters: Fort Mill, South Carolina
- Website: www.bridgetree.com

Bridgetree, Inc. is a Fort Mill, South Carolina, based company that collects data and does data analysis, related application and web programming, and logistical services.

Bridgetree provides services to a variety of industries, such as retail, financial services, travel, consumer products, sports entertainment and non-profits. The company has corporate operations in the United States (remote workforce) and Bangalore, India.

== History ==
This privately held company was founded in 1995 as WIT Development, Inc by Mark Beck and Charles Albright in 1995 with a motto to “make marketing work better”. Early on, the company provided USPS logistics for initial clients R.J. Reynolds, Thomasville Furniture and US Airways.

The founders split their business interests in 1997 which led to Mark Beck, renaming his part of the company Bridgetree, Inc. At this time, Beck added data-mining, data production and consumer databases to the company's list of services.

The company opened Bridgetree Research Services in 2000, added data gathering, web programming and its first data center in 2001. The company opened a second data center in 2006 and launched Bridgetree Technology Service in Xi'an, China, in 2007. In 2007, the company moved operations from Davidson, North Carolina, to a historic building in Mooresville, North Carolina that is included in the Mooresville Historic District. It opened a mobile application programming operation in Bangalore, India, in 2010.

As of 2019, China Office was closed and all the operations were moved to US and India. Below is the current executive team:

1. CEO - Chris Talley
2. VP, Clients & Business Dev - Mark Malone
3. VP, Technology - Sanjay Mamani
4. CFO, Controller - Sonna Hughes
