= Heyward Shepherd monument =

Monument in Harpers Ferry, West Virginia, USA

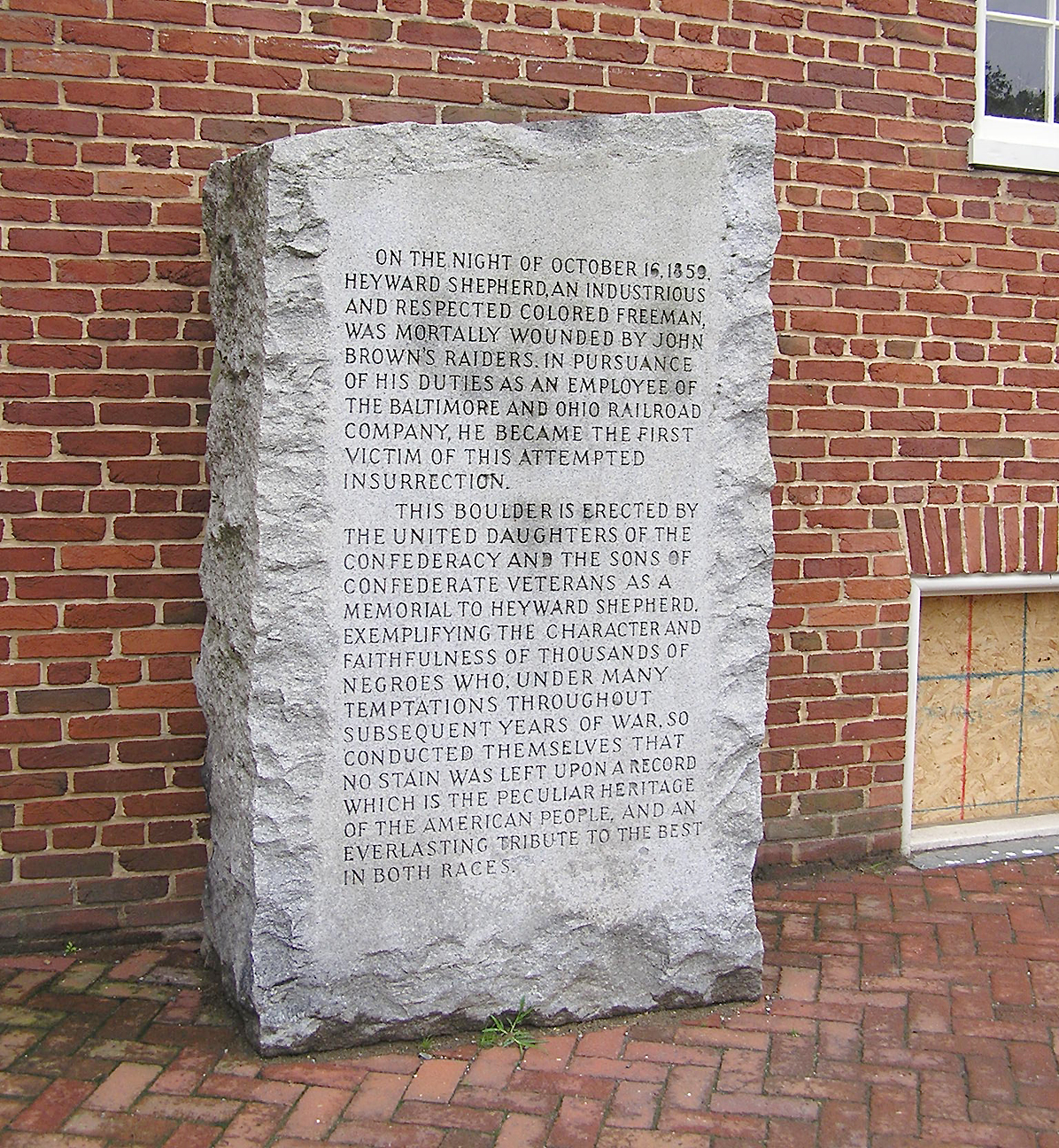
The Heyward Shepherd monument

The Heyward Shepherd monument is a monument in Harpers Ferry, West Virginia. It commemorates Haywood (Note: "Heyward" is a misspelling of Shepherd's recorded name of Haywood.) Shepherd (1825 – October 17, 1859), a free black man who was the first person killed during John Brown's raid on Harpers Ferry. It was erected in 1931 by the United Daughters of the Confederacy (UDC), who sought to promote Shepherd as a "faithful slave" and role model for Blacks. (Note: The UDC originally assumed that Shepherd had been a slave. They eventually changed the memorial to reflect Shepherd's status as a free man, but they continued to refer to it as the "faithful slave monument". According to the historian Caroline Janney, "They found little relevance in his status as free or slave—either way, he was a black man who was 'loyal' and subservient to white interests.") The inscription misrepresents the circumstances of Shepherd's death to imply that he consciously opposed John Brown's plan to spark a slave rebellion; in reality, Shepherd was not aware of the plan and believed he was dealing with robbers. The inscription goes on to praise the "faithfulness of thousands of negroes" to the Confederacy during the American Civil War. The idea of the "faithful slave" was an important component of the "Lost Cause of the Confederacy", a pseudohistorical myth that the cause of the Confederacy was justified and not centered on slavery. The Heyward Shepherd monument was one of many erected by the UDC.

The UDC commissioned the monument in response to a nearby plaque dedicated to John Brown in 1918 by the all-black Storer College. Although the monument was completed before 1923, it was not installed immediately because local White leaders feared that it would provoke interracial animosity. The UDC eventually agreed to change the design to satisfy White leaders' concerns, and the memorial was dedicated in 1931. Despite the changes, the monument was strongly opposed by the NAACP, the Black press, and the local Black community. The NAACP responded by creating a new tablet that was even stronger in its support for John Brown. The Heyward Shepherd monument continued to be controversial. The National Park Service (NPS) designed a series of interpretative signs to place the monument in historical context, and from 1981 to 1995 kept it covered in plywood to prevent vandalism. As of 2022, the monument remains on display accompanied by an interpretative sign.

== Historical context ==
=== Black people's response to John Brown ===
See also John Brown's raiders#Black participation

The monument was intended to publicize the Lost Cause allegation that the enslaved were happy and did not want freedom; the UDC had a "Faithful Slave Memorial Committee". However, the grand jury Bill of Indictment lists 11 Black enslaved men who were allegedly incited to revolt by the accused. One was locked up in the Charles Town jail together with Brown, Green, and the others. The owners of two submitted claims for their losses. Some slaves were observed with weapons inside the Arsenal. The story that Washington and Allstadt's slaves were there only because they were forced to be there is what the slaves had said, after Brown's raid had failed, and their owners wanted to believe that.

A different view is provided by Osborne Perry Anderson, the only Black in Brown's party who escaped:

On the Sunday evening of the outbreak, when we visited the plantations and acquainted the slaves with our purpose to effect their liberation, the greatest enthusiasm was manifested by them—joy and hilarity beamed from every countenance. One old mother, white-haired from age, and borne down with the labors of many years in bonds, when told of the work in hand, replied: "God bless you! God bless you!" She then kissed the party at her house, and requested all to kneel, which we did, and she offered prayer to God for His blessing on the enterprise, and our success. At the slaves' quarters, there was apparently a general jubilee, and they stepped forward manfully, without impressing or coaxing. Captain Brown...was surprised and pleased by the promptitude with which they volunteered, and with their manly bearing at the scene of violence. ...The truth of the Harper's Ferry "raid," as it has been called, in regard to the part taken by the slaves, and the aid given by colored men generally, demonstrates clearly: First, that the conduct of the slaves is a strong guarantee of the weakness of the institution, should a favorable opportunity occur; and, secondly, that the colored people, as a body, were well represented by numbers, both in the fight, and in the number who suffered martyrdom afterward.

However, the official view, in the reports of the Virginians Lt. Col. Robert E. Lee and Governor Henry A. Wise, was that no Blacks participated voluntarily at all. Lee's report did not become public until the report of the Senate Select Committee investigating the incident, over six months later. But Wise's views were widely known, as he stated them clearly in speeches, which appeared in many newspapers.

There is no evidence that Shepherd was opposed to John Brown's plan to end American slavery, or even that he had heard of it. He thought he was dealing with robbers. Nevertheless, the monument was intended to be a reply to Blacks' glorification of Brown, in whose honor Storer College had been established in Harpers Ferry; the college placed a plaque on the Armory in 1918. There was no better place, from the UDC's point of view, for a monument to the "happy slave" than Harpers Ferry.

=== Haywood Shepherd ===
Haywood Shepherd was a Black man; according to one source he was born free, but another source says that he had been the property of station master Fontaine Beckham. He was over 6 feet (180 cm) in height, and lived in Winchester, Virginia, about 30 miles (48 km) southwest of Harpers Ferry, which two communities were served by the Winchester and Potomac rail line. He owned a small house there, had a wife and five children, according to the 1860 census, and had money in the bank.

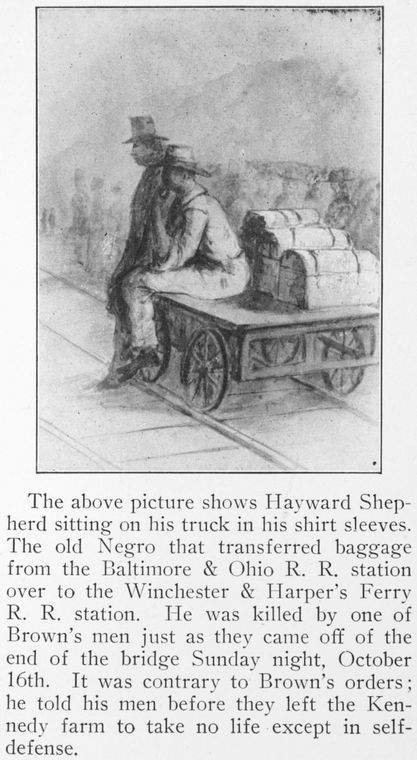
This is from a 1906 book by Elijah Avey, The Capture and Execution of John Brown. The author says that he was an eyewitness. It is not known if it was the author who made the drawing.

He had worked for nearly twenty years as a porter or baggage handler with the Baltimore and Ohio Railroad, whose trains went back and forth through Harpers Ferry. In Harpers Ferry was the first interline rail junction in the country: there was frequently baggage or freight to move to or from the trains of the Winchester and Potomac Railroad, whose northern terminus was the Harpers Ferry station. The stationmaster was Fontaine Beckham, the popular mayor of Harpers Ferry; when he was absent, Shepherd was in charge of the station. Beckham, who also was killed, "liked him very much."

What happened, as described by Shepherd to the physician who treated him, John D. Starry, was "that he had been out on the railroad bridge looking for a watchman who was missing, and he had been ordered to halt by some men who were there, and, instead of doing that, he turned to go back to the office, and as he turned they shot him in the back." He rejected his assaulters' claim that this was to begin a slave rebellion. He thought they were robbers and refused to keep quiet as they requested.

A bill was introduced into the Virginia Legislature to provide a pension for his widow Sarah. His wife and children moved to Washington, D.C.

He was buried in the Winchester–Fairfax Colored Cemetery, on what is today Route 11, with "honors of war by the military companies of the town, accompanied by the mayor and other citizens." However, in 1932 no one could find his grave.

Subsequently, Winchester's Old Colored Cemetery has been paved over and the location used for parking. It was located at current North East Lane and Woodstock Lane, near 39.18444°N 78.16069°W.

== Monuments ==
There has been contention throughout the 20th century as to what plaque, if any, should be displayed next to the UDC's memorial. "Today the Heyward Shepherd Memorial stands not as a representative of a community's collective remembrance, but rather as a testament to the struggle between Southern Whites and African Americans to write their respective memories of the raid into the historical landscape."

=== 1918 plaque to Brown ===
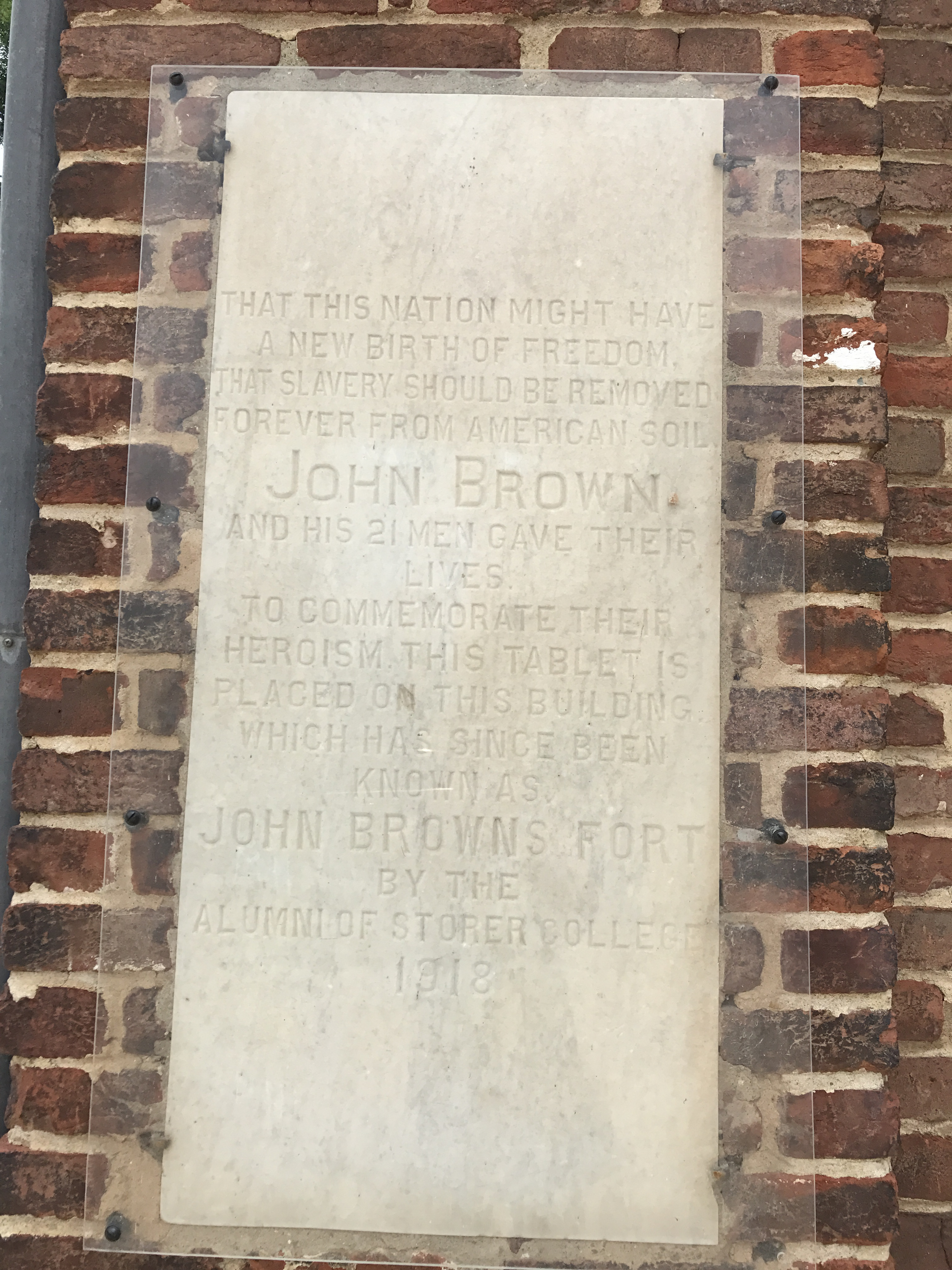
John Brown's Fort plaque

The origin of the monument to the "faithful slave" is the monument to Brown, posted on the original building, the "firehouse," which had been moved to the campus of Storer College:

THAT THIS NATION MIGHT HAVE
A NEW BIRTH OF FREEDOM
THAT SLAVERY SHOULD BE REMOVED
FOREVER FROM AMERICAN SOIL
JOHN BROWN
AND HIS 21 MEN GAVE THEIR
LIVES
TO COMMEMORATE THEIR
HEROISM THIS TABLET IS
PLACED ON THIS BUILDING
WHICH HAS SINCE BEEN
KNOWN AS
JOHN BROWN'S FORT
BY THE
ALUMNI OF STORER COLLEGE
1918

=== 1931 monument ===
In 1931, after opposition since it had been proposed in 1920, what was called at the time the Faithful Slave Memorial was erected by the Sons of Confederate Veterans and the United Daughters of the Confederacy (39°19′24″N 77°43′48″W). The text of the granite monument reads:

On the night of October 16, 1859, Heyward Shepherd, an industrious and respected colored freeman, was mortally wounded by John Brown's raiders. In pursuance of his duties as an employee of the Baltimore and Ohio Railroad Company, he became the first victim of this attempted insurrection.

This boulder is erected by the United Daughters of the Confederacy and the Sons of Confederate Veterans as a memorial to Heyward Shepherd, exemplifying the character and faithfulness of thousands of negros who, under many temptations throughout subsequent years of war, so conducted themselves that no stain was left upon a record which is the peculiar heritage of the American people, and an everlasting tribute to the best in both races.

Although he had objected to the original 1920 proposal as provocative of "unpleasant racial feeling"—there was a Ku Klux Klan march a year later—Storer College president Henry T. MacDonald gave the opening address, and the college chorus performed. A "distinguished colored clergyman" gave the benediction.

=== 1932 plaque ===
The monument was immediately challenged by many as perpetuating the "happy slave" concept of slavery as a justification for the practice.

The NAACP responded by preparing a plaque, which they called "The Great Tablet", to be displayed at Storer College in Harpers Ferry, where the firehouse used by John Brown as a fort had been moved. The text on the plaque, replying to the "faithful slave" allegation that Virginia's happy slaves did not want freedom, states that seven "slaves and sons of slaves" fought with Brown, who was "crucified". It was written by W. E. B. Du Bois, author of a biography of John Brown and NAACP cofounder. Henry T. McDonald, the white president of Storer, who had participated in the UDC's 1931 ceremony, refused to allow the plaque to be mounted, because he found it "too militant".

In 2006, 74 years later, the plaque was finally given a public place, but a remote one: on the former Storer College grounds, at the Fort's former location. Tourist guides largely ignore it. The plaque reads:

HERE
JOHN BROWN
AIMED AT HUMAN SLAVERY
A BLOW
THAT WOKE A GUILTY NATION.
WITH HIM FOUGHT
SEVEN SLAVES AND SONS OF SLAVES.
OVER HIS CRUCIFIED CORPSE
MARCHED 200,000 BLACK SOLDIERS
AND 4,000,000 FREEDMEN
SINGING
“JOHN BROWN’S BODY LIES
A-MOULDERING IN THE GRAVE
BUT HIS SOUL GOES MARCHING ON!”

IN GRATITUDE THIS TABLET IS ERECTED
THE NATIONAL ASSOCIATION FOR THE
ADVANCEMENT OF COLORED PEOPLE
MAY 21, 1932

2010 picture of the plaque at its current location. Close-up photo.

=== 1955 plaque ===
A plaque to contextualize the original 1931 monument was placed in 1955 by the National Park Service. The text of the plaque read:

John Brown's raid on the armory at Harpers Ferry caused the death of four townspeople. One of those who died in the fighting was Heyward Shepherd, a railroad baggagemaster and a free black. Although the true identity of his assailant is uncertain, Shepherd soon became a symbol of the "faithful servant" among those who deplored Brown's action against the traditional southern way of life. The monument, placed here in 1931, reflects those traditional views.

The monument was in storage from 1976 to 1980 and then shrouded in plywood, supposedly to protect it from vandalism, until 1995.

=== 1995 plaque ===
Another plaque was installed near the 1931 monument by the National Park Service, to place the monument in context. It reads:

On October 17, 1859, abolitionist John Brown attacked Harpers Ferry to launch a war against slavery. Heyward Shepherd, a free African-American railroad baggage master, was shot and killed by Brown's men shortly after midnight. Seventy-two years later, on October 10, 1931, a crowd estimated to 300 whites and 100 blacks gathered to unveil and dedicate the Shepherd Monument. During the ceremony, voices rose to praise and denounce the monument. Conceived around the turn of the century, the monument endured controversy. In 1905, the United Daughters of the Confederacy stated that erecting the monument would influence for good the present and coming generations, and prove that the people of the South who owned slaves valued and respected their good qualities as no one else ever did or will do.

"Also on the wayside [the 1995 plaque] is a section titled 'Another Perspective.' It is the same response to the Shepherd Memorial that Du Bois wrote in 1932 and hoped to have inscribed on the John Brown Fort".

== See also ==
- Loyal slaves monument
