= Frieling USA =

American producer of kitchenware

- Type: Private
- Industry: Manufacturing
- Founded: 1988; 38 years ago in New York City, United States
- Founders: Monika & Bernard Schnacke
- Headquarters: Fort Mill, South Carolina, United States
- Key people: Drew Brown (president)
- Products: Kitchen/hospitality products
- Number of employees: 17
- Website: frieling.com

Frieling USA is an American manufacturing and distribution company whose focus is on high-end kitchen and hospitality products, serveware and coffee/tea accessories for both home and commercial use. Founded by Monika and Bernard Schnacke in 1988, Frieling USA has strategic international alliances with Woll, Cilio, Leonardo, Durgol, Kuechenprofi, Zenker, Seltmann Weiden, Helios, and Zassenhaus in order to distribute their products in addition to their own Frieling fresh solutions brand. The company’s headquarters is in Fort Mill, SC just across the state line from Charlotte, NC.

== Products ==
Frieling is known for their Handle-It Glass Bottom Springform Pan and their line of 5 different size stainless steel French Presses. Durgol Universal and Durgol Swiss Espresso have become the market leader in countries around the world as one of the fastest (5-10 times faster than other brands) environmentally friendly decalcifier on the market.
