= Anne Springs Close Greenway =

- Interactive map of Anne Springs Close Greenway
- Type: Greenway
- Location: Fort Mill, South Carolina
- Coordinates: 35.0455°N 80.9323°W
- Area: 2,100 acres (850 ha)
- Operator: Leroy Springs & Company, Fort Mill, SC
- Website: Anne Springs Close Greenway

The Anne Springs Close Greenway is an extensive protected natural area in Fort Mill, South Carolina consisting of approximately 2,100 acres (9.3 km^{2}) of lakes, forests, and pastures that include trails for hiking, biking, kayaking, and horseback riding. The land for the greenway was donated in 1995 by the family of Anne Springs Close, a lifelong supporter of recreation and the environment. It is run by Leroy Springs & Company.

The greenway presents summer concerts and also provides facilities for picnicking, camping, and mountain biking.

== Recreation Complex ==
The Recreation Complex at 971 Tom Hall Street was gifted to the Town of Fort Mill by the 501(c)(3) nonprofit organization, Leroy Springs & Company, Inc. in 2019. It serves as the Complex Branch of the Upper Palmetto YMCA and is run in partnership with the Fort Mill School District. It includes a multipurpose athletic field, three baseball diamonds, and six tennis courts, as well as a gym, two indoor swimming pools and a spa whirlpool open all year. The Town of Fort Mill's Parks and Recreation Department utilizes the Complex facilities for Youth Sports programming.
