= Spratt Cemetery =

Historic site in York County, South Carolina, US

- U.S. National Register of Historic Places
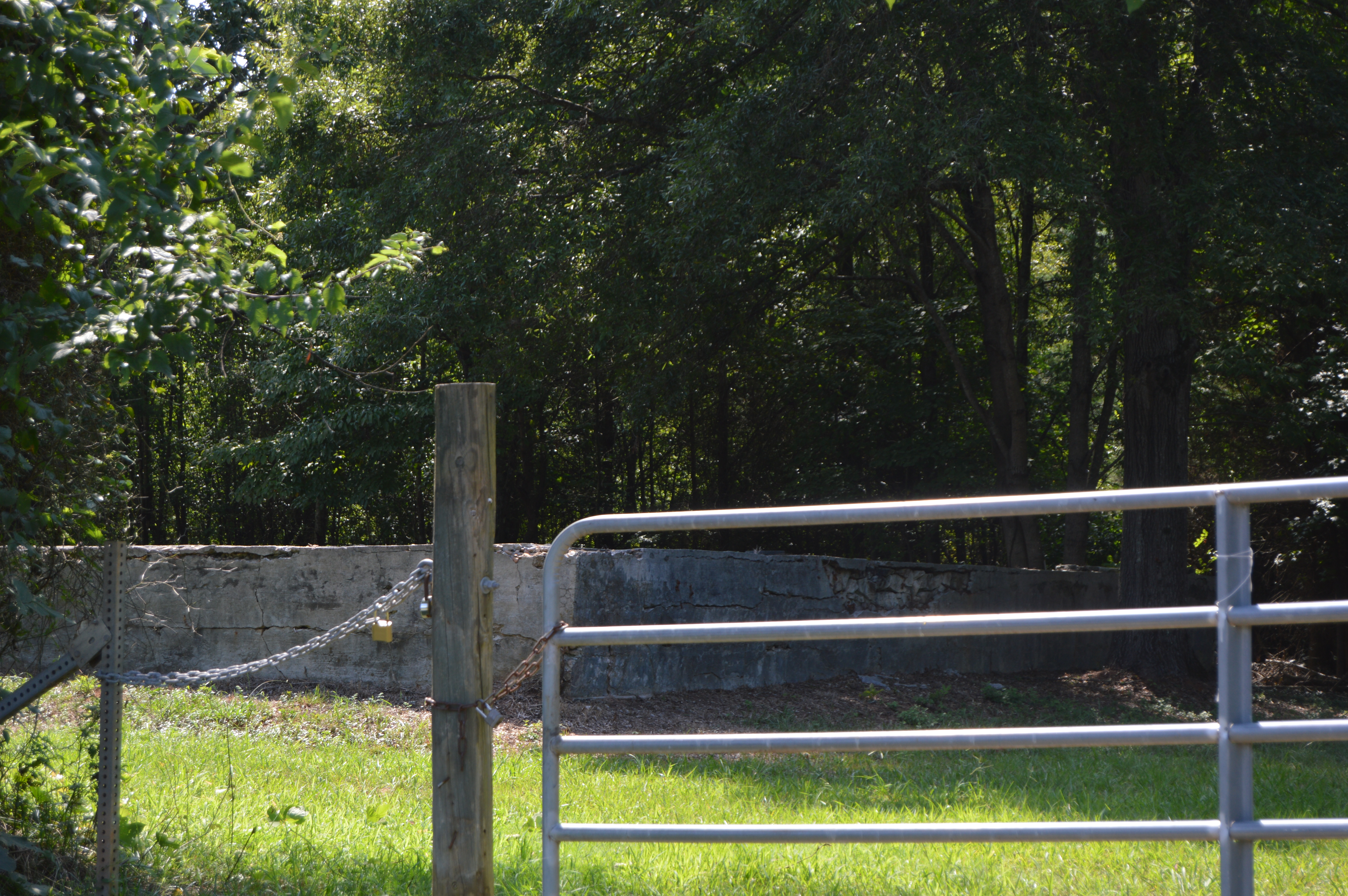
- Roadside view

- Location within South Carolina Location within the United States
- Location: Brickyard Rd., near Fort Mill, South Carolina
- Coordinates: 34°59′58″N 80°57′10″W
- Area: 1 acre (0.40 ha)
- MPS: Nation Ford Road Area MPS
- NRHP reference No.: 00000597
- Added to NRHP: March 1, 2007

Spratt Cemetery is a historic family cemetery located near Fort Mill, South Carolina. It contains graves of three generations of the Spratt family, and other early settlers of the Fort Mill area. The cemetery consists of 14 marked graves and approximately 9 graves with broken stones or partial markers. It includes the grave of Thomas "Kanawha" Spratt (c. 1731 – 1807), one of the first settlers of the area, and located adjacent to the site his homestead along Nation Ford Road. The land was provided for the Spratt homestead by the General New River, leader of the Catawba tribe.

It was added to the National Register of Historic Places in 2007.
