= Loyal slaves monument =

Monument in South Carolina, United States

Coordinates: 35.007678747130605°N 80.94483184717178°W

The loyal slaves monument (or faithful slaves monument; it does not have a formal proper name) is an 1896 monument in Confederate Park in Fort Mill, South Carolina, dedicated to the proposition that slaves were loyal and gladly helpful to the Confederacy, and honoring them.

This small monument was the first faithful-slave monument in the United States, and remains one of very few in the South mentioning or depicting slaves, and the only one dedicated entirely to slaves as a general class.

== Context ==
Confederate monuments were erected in the 1890s and early 1900s by Southern whites to justify the spread of Jim Crow laws and white supremacy, oppress and terrorize black citizens, and popularize through permanent visual symbols the Lost Cause view of Southern history and its historical visions of the Civil War and Reconstruction. The 1896 dedication of the Fort Mill loyal slaves monument was near the beginning of a significant spike in the construction of these Confederate monuments.

The monument also represented a new trend in Civil War memorials, that of honoring anonymous common people such as generic soldiers or homefront white women rather than famous leaders such as Lee or Lincoln.

== Description and history ==
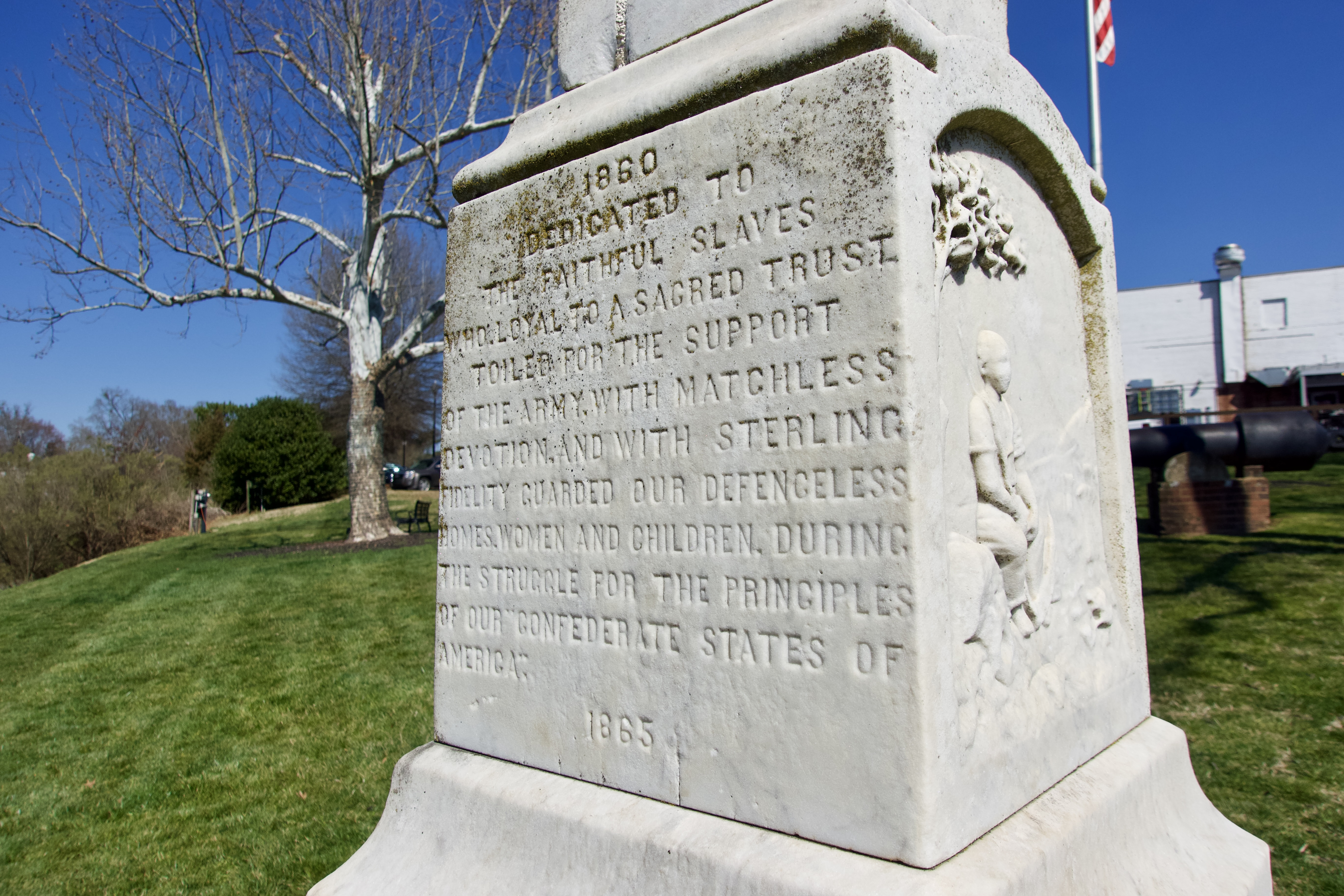
Inscription and a carving on the loyal slaves monument in Confederate Park in Fort Mill, SC.

The 13-foot (4.0 m) monument is an obelisk of white marble resting on a marble base which is supported by four steps of masonry. Two opposing faces feature bas-relief carvings depicting enslaved Blacks, one side being a mammy stereotype figure cradling a white baby and the other a Black wheat reaper. Also included is a list of ten faithful slaves, eight bearing the surname White.

The inscription on the monument reads:

Dedicated to the faithful slaves who, loyal to a sacred trust, toiled for support of the army. With matchless devotion, and with sterling fidelity guarded our defenseless homes, women, and children during the struggle for the principles of our Confederate States of America.

The monument was dedicated in 1896 by local cotton mill owner Samuel E. White and the Jefferson Davis Memorial Association. White, who had also sponsored the monument, was a former Confederate officer who was the son of William Elliott White and scion of a family which had been prominent in Fort Mill since its founding, and founder of the Springs Industries textile empire (of later "Miss Springmaid" fame). Smith also sponsored or led the efforts to install three other monuments, all on the Fort Mill town green: a generic confederate soldier monument (dedicated 1891), a monument to Confederate women, and a monument honoring the Catawba people, native to the area.

The main speaker at the dedication of the loyal slaves monument was entertainer Polk Miller, a white defender of slavery, who in his remarks contrasted "uppity" African Americans of turn of the 20th century with the "Negro of the good old days gone by", suggesting that emancipation had been an unfortunate development.

The Fort Mill loyal slaves monument, was the first Confederate memorial to acknowledge the existence of slavery rather than avoiding mention of it, and it is still the only Confederate monument that depicts both house and field slavery.

== Analysis and criticism ==
The monument was criticized in the North from its inception. The Milwaukee Sentinel censured and mocked the Charleston News and Courier for its enthusiastic endorsement of the memorial, while the New York Tribune excoriated Southerners for erecting such a monument at the same time as numerous lynchings were being committed. A. A. Taylor in the Black-oriented newspaper Indianapolis Freeman, while averring that Smith's motive for sponsoring the monument was noble, held that nevertheless it would be an everlasting source of shame to both African Americans and slave owners alike.

These monuments promulgate the idea that the Confederate cause united both races against invading Yankee hordes. In doing so, they reinforce a myth that ignored the many ways that enslaved people undermined the Confederate war effort, most notably by running off to the Union army and fighting against their former oppressors.

— Kevin M. Levin, Smithsonian, 2017

Criticism did not fade over time. Art historian Freeman H. M. Murray included it in his influential 1916 work Emancipation and the Freed in American Sculpture. With the growth of the movement to remove Confederate monuments in the 21st century, the monument again came under national scrutiny. Smithsonian magazine placed the monument with others of the loyal-slave type as intentionally presenting a false narrative, intended to justify the continuation of white supremacy by lost causers, while leftist magazine The Nation also included it with other loyal-slave monuments as "prop[ping] up the fantasy that slaves were happy, loyal, and devoted to those who enslaved them."

== Local attitudes ==
The monument is popular with the local white population, and even the Fort Mill African American community has a complicated, and not always negative, attitude. One Fort Mill African American resident opined "I agree it should stay up and be there for people to see and understand that is where we came from. This is my great-grandfather Handy White on here. This is where I came from. This is me" and some other African American residents expressed similar feelings. But other members of the Black community want the monument taken down.

Fort Mill town officials averred in 2017 that they had not heard any complaints about the monument. In 2020, however, a small demonstration was held at Confederate Park protesting all of the park's monuments including the loyal slaves monument, which has been described as among the most controversial in the park, on account of (according to critics) promoting a falsehood that slaves were happy and devoted to their owners.

== See also ==
- Heyward Shepherd monument

== Notes ==
1. "The Good Darky" or "Uncle Jack" statue (formerly in a prominent place in Natchitoches, Louisiana but now removed to the back property of the LSU Rural Life Museum in Baton Rouge) may come closest, although it may depict a former slave of post-emancipation times. The statue is of a bowing and obsequious elderly African American of the "uncle" stereotype (white southerners of this time addressed Black men as "uncle" to avoid using "mister") and was inscribed "Erected by the City of Natchitoches in Grateful Recognition of the Arduous and Faithful Services of the Good Darkies of Louisiana." The Good Darky was commissioned by Jack Bryan in 1926, executed by Hans Schuler, toppled into the Cane River in 1968, retrieved and put in storage for some years, and in 1974 donated by Bryan's estate to the LSU Rural Life Museum.
  The large Confederate Memorial in Arlington National Cemetery also depicts a faithful Black body-servant following his young master and a Confederate officer kissing his infant child who is held in the arms of a weeping Black mammy, but also has many other figures. The 1931 Heyward Shepherd monument in Harper's Ferry is dedicated to an individual supposedly faithful slave.
  The United Daughters of the Confederacy tried to get one faithful-slave monument put up in every Confederate state but failed, although they nearly succeeded in the District of Columbia when in 1923 the United States Senate voted a grant of land on Massachusetts Avenue in Washington D. C. for a large monument "in memory of the faithful slave mammies of the South", to be erected by the United Daughters of the Confederacy as a gift to the nation, but the House of Representatives allowed the bill to die in committee following some objections.)
2. Or 1895. Kytle and Roberts give 1896 as the year of dedication, and David Blight gives specifically May 1896, but the monument itself is inscribed "1895", and many sources give this date.
