= Fort Mill Downtown Historic District =

Historic district in South Carolina, United States

- U.S. National Register of Historic Places
- U.S. Historic district
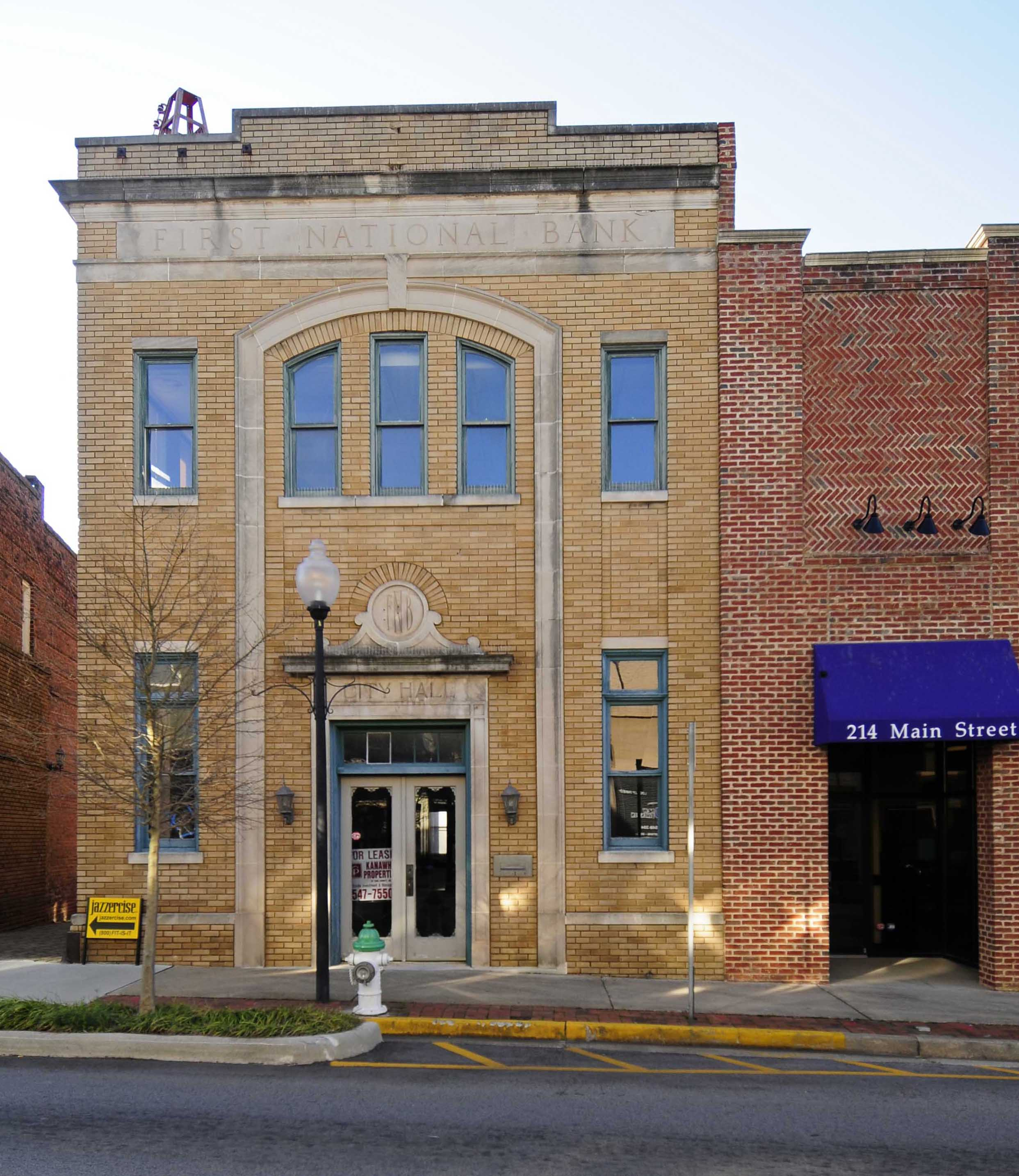
- First National Bank / Old City Hall, Fort Mill Downtown Historic District, March 2012

- Location within South Carolina Location within the United States
- Location: Main St. from Confederate Park E to 233 Main, Fort Mill, South Carolina
- Coordinates: 35°0′28″N 80°56′39″W
- Area: 5 acres (2.0 ha)
- Architectural style: Late 19th And 20th Century Revivals
- MPS: Fort Mill MPS
- NRHP reference No.: 92000646
- Added to NRHP: June 11, 1992

Fort Mill Downtown Historic District is a national historic district located at Fort Mill, York County, South Carolina. It encompasses 16 contributing buildings, 1 contributing site, 1 contributing structure, and 4 contributing objects in the central business district of Fort Mill. The buildings are predominantly one and two-story masonry commercial buildings constructed between 1860 and 1940. The district includes the Confederate Park and its Bandstand. Notable contributing resources include the Confederate Soldiers Monument, Catawba Indians Monument, Faithful Slaves Monument, Jones Drug Store, and First National Bank / Old City Hall.

It was added to the National Register of Historic Places in 1992.
