= Mammy memorial =

Proposed memorial in Washington D.C.

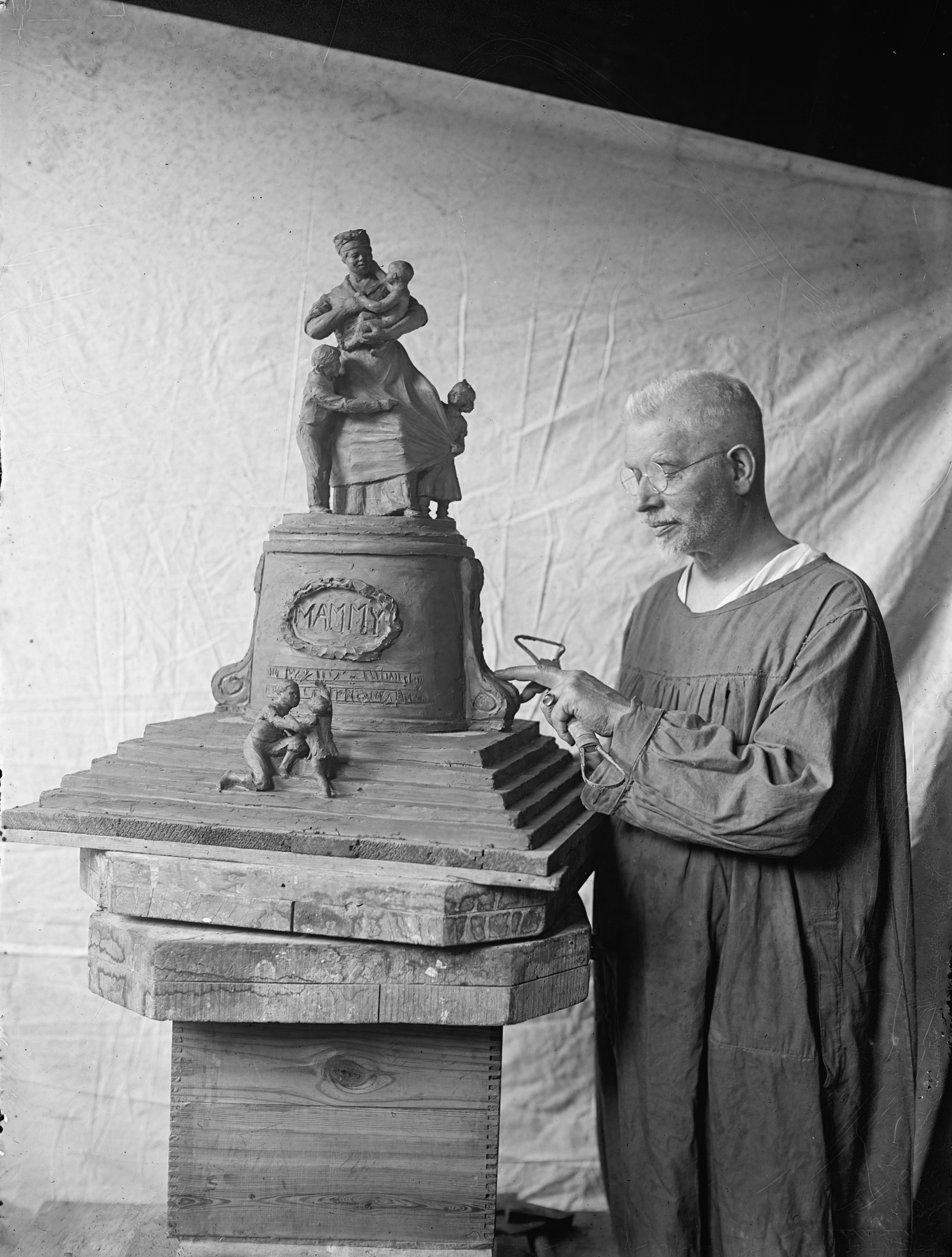
Sculptor Ulric Stonewall Jackson Dunbar with a maquette of his proposal for the memorial, June 1923

Although never given an official name, a "Mammy memorial" was a proposed memorial to be located in the District of Columbia, United States, that would have honored enslaved African domestic workers of the Antebellum South, known pejoratively as "mammys".

The idea was reported as early as 1910 in a newspaper article. A group called the "Mammy Memorial Institute", based in Athens, Georgia, sought donations from the public for the monument. In 1923, Mississippi Senator John Sharp Williams introduced a bill for its construction that was backed by the United Daughters of the Confederacy and Congressman Charles Manly Stedman from North Carolina made a speech in favour of it in the United States House of Representatives which was cheered by representatives from both Republican and Democratic parties.

Design proposals were submitted to the United Daughters of the Confederacy by sculptors and architects seeking the commission. These included submissions by Canadian-American Ulric Stonewall Jackson Dunbar and Romanian/Hungarian-American George Julian Zolnay, known as the Sculptor of the Confederacy for the number of commissions he had undertaken of Confederate subjects on behalf of Southern clients.

The proposed monument was immediately condemned by African Americans and other groups such as the Women's Relief Corps of the Grand Army of the Republic and the New York World newspaper. It was condemned in a widely-circulated editorial in the Washington Evening Star written by Mary Church Terrell. The Chicago Defender published a cartoon showing a white southerner presenting plans for the monument to the hanging body of a lynching victim.

Many commentators viewed the memorial as objectionable in itself as well as a waste of money that could be better used improving the lives of living black people. Petitions and letters opposed to the monument were sent to politicians, including ones sent to Vice-President Calvin Coolidge and House Speaker Frederick H. Gillett that carried the signatures of 2000 black women. Ultimately, the controversy raised by the monument caused its bill to be dropped and no further action on it was taken.

The monument would have been located on Massachusetts Avenue. In 2002, a Statue of Tomáš Garrigue Masaryk was erected on the site.

== See also ==
- Loyal slaves monument
