= Nation Ford Road =

- U.S. National Register of Historic Places
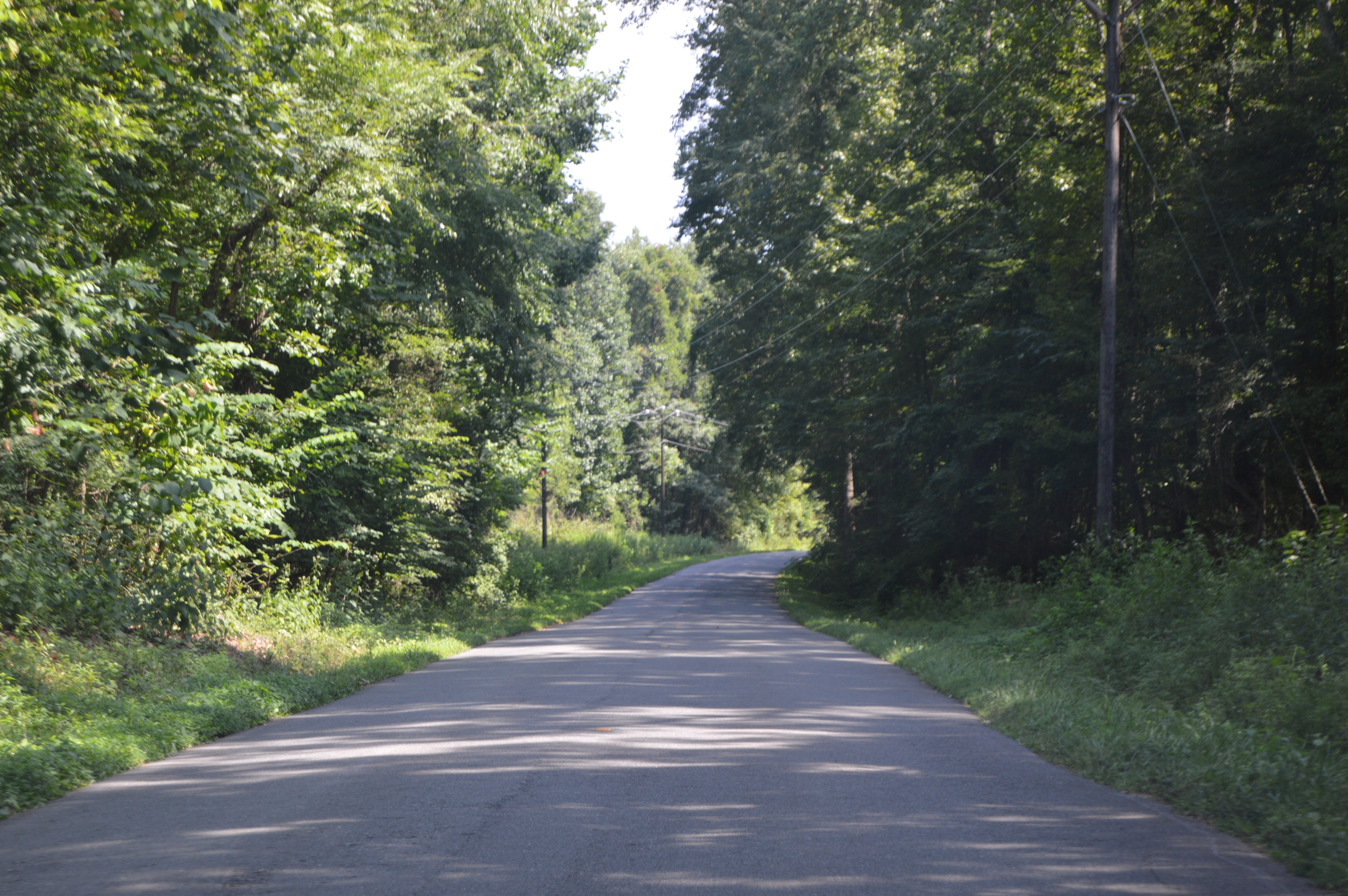
- Brickyard Road south of Fort Mill

- Location within South Carolina Location within the United States
- Location: 5 noncontiguous sections of roadbed in and near Fort Mill, South Carolina
- Area: 7.5 acres (3.0 ha)
- MPS: Nation Ford Road Area MPS
- NRHP reference No.: 00000593
- Added to NRHP: March 1, 2007

Nation Ford Road is a historic roadbed located near Fort Mill, York County, South Carolina. It dates to pre-historic times and is one of the oldest documented travel routes in the southeast. It provided one of the few reliable crossing places on the Catawba River and was being used by white traders as early as 1650. The presence of the road led many early European settlers to locate in the area. Segments of the road are visible near the William Elliott White House and Springfield Plantation House.

It was added to the National Register of Historic Places in 2007.
