= Wilson House (Fort Mill, South Carolina) =

Historic house in South Carolina, United States

- U.S. National Register of Historic Places
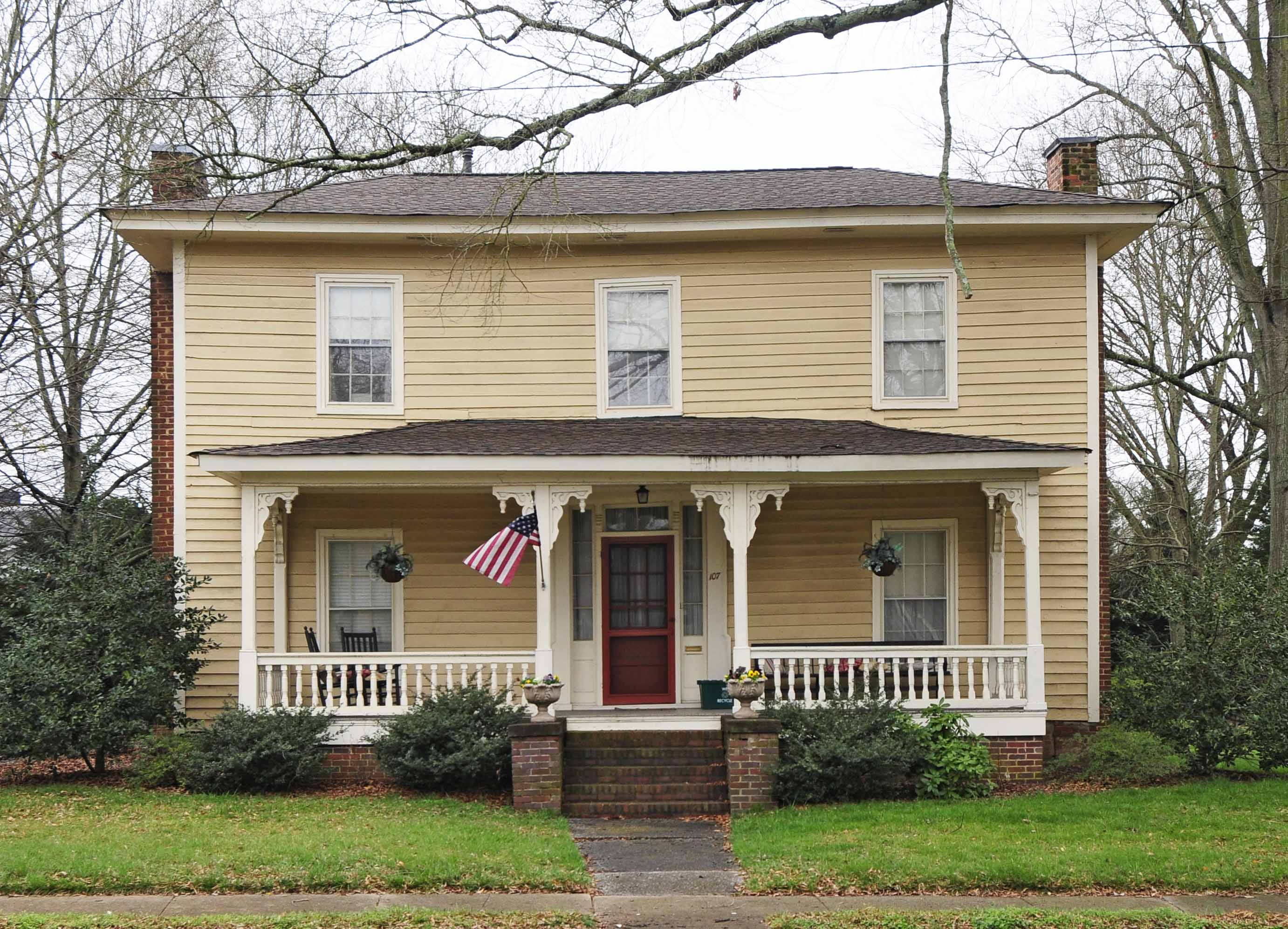
- Wilson House, March 2012

- Location within South Carolina Location within the United States
- Location: 107 Clebourne St., Fort Mill, South Carolina
- Coordinates: 35°0′31″N 80°56′38″W
- Area: less than one acre
- Built: c. 1869
- Architectural style: Late Victorian
- MPS: Fort Mill MPS
- NRHP reference No.: 92000650
- Added to NRHP: June 11, 1992

Wilson House, also known as the Hull House, is a historic home located at Fort Mill, York County, South Carolina. It was built about 1869, and is a two-story, three-bay, frame I-house with several one-story rear additions. The front façade features hip roofed porch with decorative brackets and turned balustrade in the Late Victorian style.

It was added to the National Register of Historic Places in 1992.
