= John M. White House =

Historic house in South Carolina, United States

- U.S. National Register of Historic Places
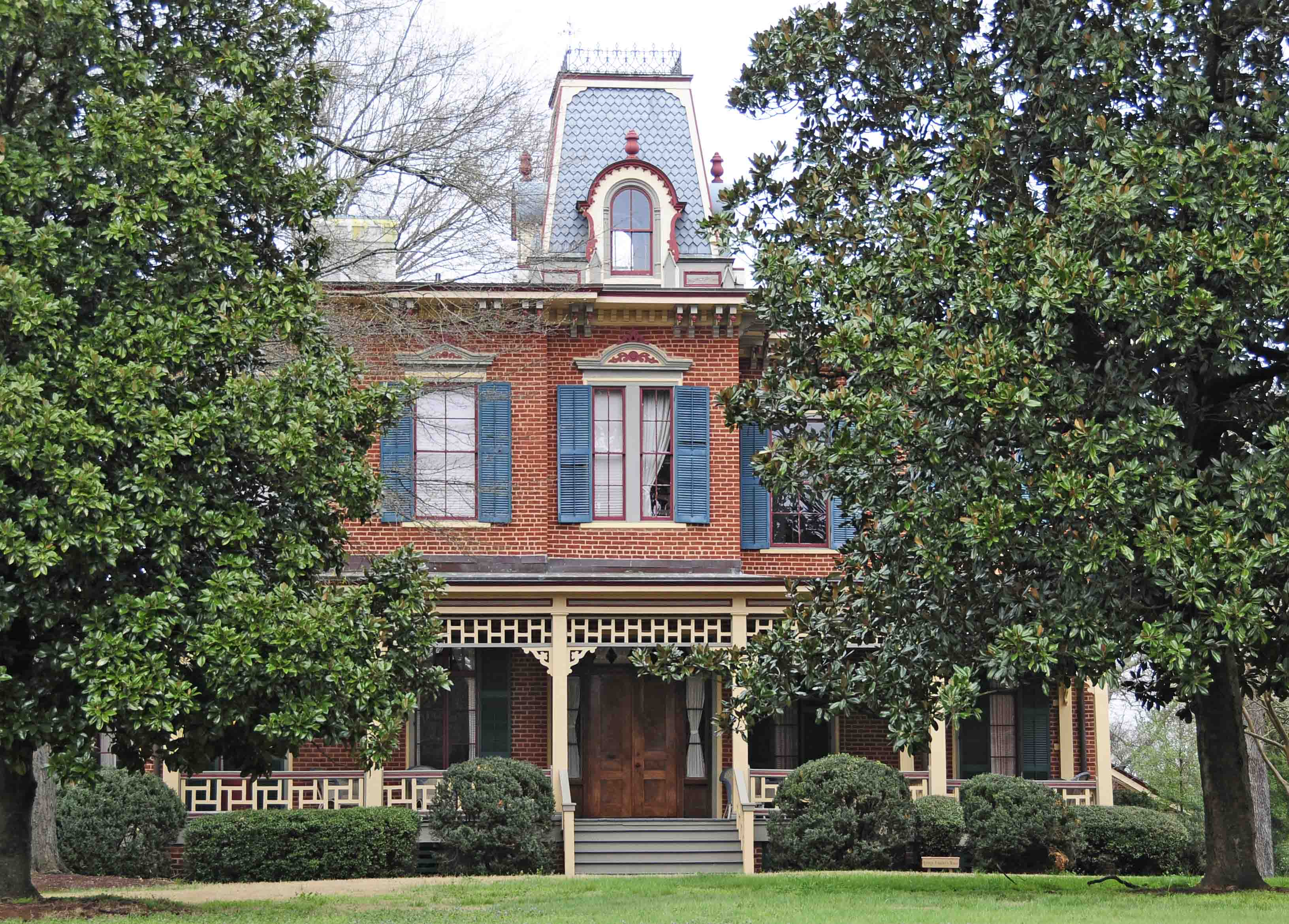
- John M. White House, March 2012

- Location within South Carolina Location within the United States
- Location: White & Skipper Sts., Fort Mill, South Carolina
- Coordinates: 35°0′36″N 80°56′50″W
- Area: 3.5 acres (1.4 ha)
- Built: c. 1872
- Architectural style: Second Empire, Italian Villa
- NRHP reference No.: 85002385
- Added to NRHP: September 12, 1985

John M. White House, also known as Springs Industries Guest House, is a historic home located at Fort Mill, York County, South Carolina. It was built about 1872, and is a two-story brick dwelling with Italianate and Second Empire style design elements. It features a low-pitched, bracketed roof, a front verandah with decorative brackets, and a mansard roofed central pavilion. Also on the property is a one-story brick cottage and carriage house / garage.

It was added to the National Register of Historic Places in 1985.
