= John Brown (biography) =

Biography written by W. E. B. Du Bois about the abolitionist John Brown

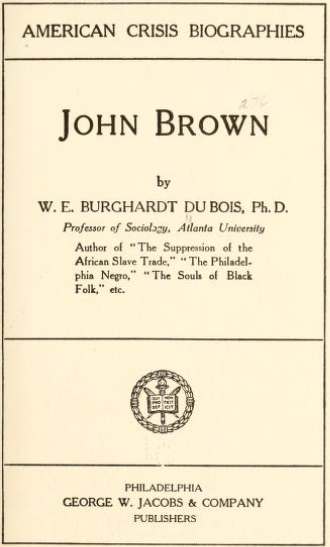
- The title page of the first edition
- Author: W. E. B. Du Bois
- Language: English
- Series: American Crisis Biographies
- Subject: Biography
- Publisher: George W. Jacobs and Company
- Publication date: 1909
- Publication place: United States
- Pages: 430
- OCLC: 674648
- LC Class: E451.D81

John Brown is a biography written by W. E. B. Du Bois about the abolitionist John Brown. Published in 1909, it tells the story of John Brown, from his Christian rural upbringing, to his failed business ventures and finally his "blood feud" with the institution of slavery as a whole. Its moral symbolizes the significance and impact of a white abolitionist at the time, a sign of threat for white slave owners and those who believed that only black people were behind the idea of freeing slaves.

Du Bois highlights the moment in Brown's childhood when he first became radicalized against slavery:

But in all these early years of the making of this man, one incident stands out as foretaste and prophecy—an incident of which we know only the indefinite outline, and yet one which unconsciously foretold to the boy the life deed of the man. It was during the war that a certain landlord welcomed John to his home whither the boy had ridden with cattle, a hundred miles through the wilderness. He praised the big, grave and bashful lad to his guests and made much of him. John, however, discovered something far more interesting than praise and good food in the landlord's parlor, and that was another boy in the landlord's yard. Fellow souls were scarce with this backwoodsman and his diffidence warmed to the kindly welcome of the stranger, especially because he was black, half naked and wretched. In John's very ears the kind voices of the master and his folk turned to harsh abuse with this black boy. At night the slave lay in the bitter cold and once they beat the wretched thing before John's very eyes with an iron shovel, and again and again struck him with any weapon that chanced. In wide-eyed silence John looked on and questioned, Was the boy bad or stupid? No, he was active, intelligent and with the great warm sympathy of his race did the stranger "numerous little acts of kindness," so that John readily, in his straightforward candor, acknowledged him "fully if not more than his equal." (pp. 25–26)

It was this moment that Brown pledged to destroy slavery. Du Bois describes Brown as a biblical character: fanatically devoted to his abolitionist cause but also a man of rigid social and moral rules. Du Bois simultaneously describes Brown as a revolutionary, prophet and martyr, and declares him to be "a man whose leadership lay not in his office, wealth or influence, but in the white flame of his utter devotion to an ideal" (p. 135).

Du Bois showcases his studies on socialism and social Darwinism in this work. It is also a continuation of the examination of the genealogy of Blacks outlined in The Philadelphia Negro (1899) and The Souls of Black Folk (1903), that refutes the biological differences between Blacks and whites.

According to Du Bois, Brown was a man who based his fight against slavery not on social Darwinism, but on his personal values.

In 1997 a new edition appeared, with a new introduction and primary documents.
