= Unity Presbyterian Church Complex =

Historic church in South Carolina, United States

- U.S. National Register of Historic Places
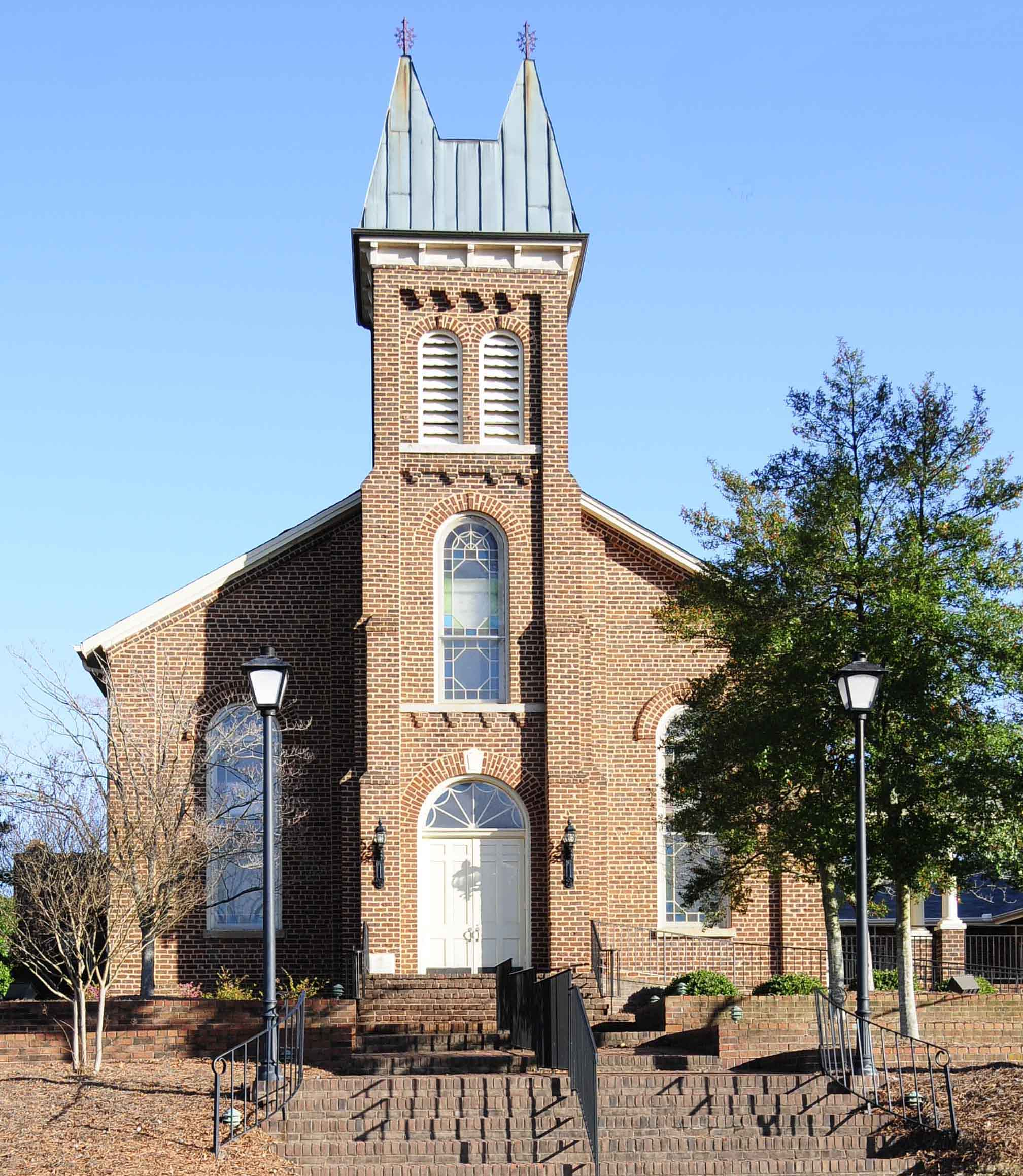

- Location within South Carolina Location within the United States
- Location: 303 Tom Hall St., Fort Mill, South Carolina
- Coordinates: 35°0′33″N 80°56′16″W
- Area: 19 acres (7.7 ha)
- Built: 1881
- Architect: Bradford, Zeb
- Architectural style: Colonial Revival, Romanesque
- MPS: Fort Mill MPS
- NRHP reference No.: 92000649
- Added to NRHP: June 11, 1992

Unity Presbyterian Church Complex is a historic church in Fort Mill, South Carolina.

It was built in 1881 and added to the National Register of Historic Places in 1992.
