= Mooresville Historic District =

Historic district in North Carolina, United States

- U.S. National Register of Historic Places
- U.S. Historic district
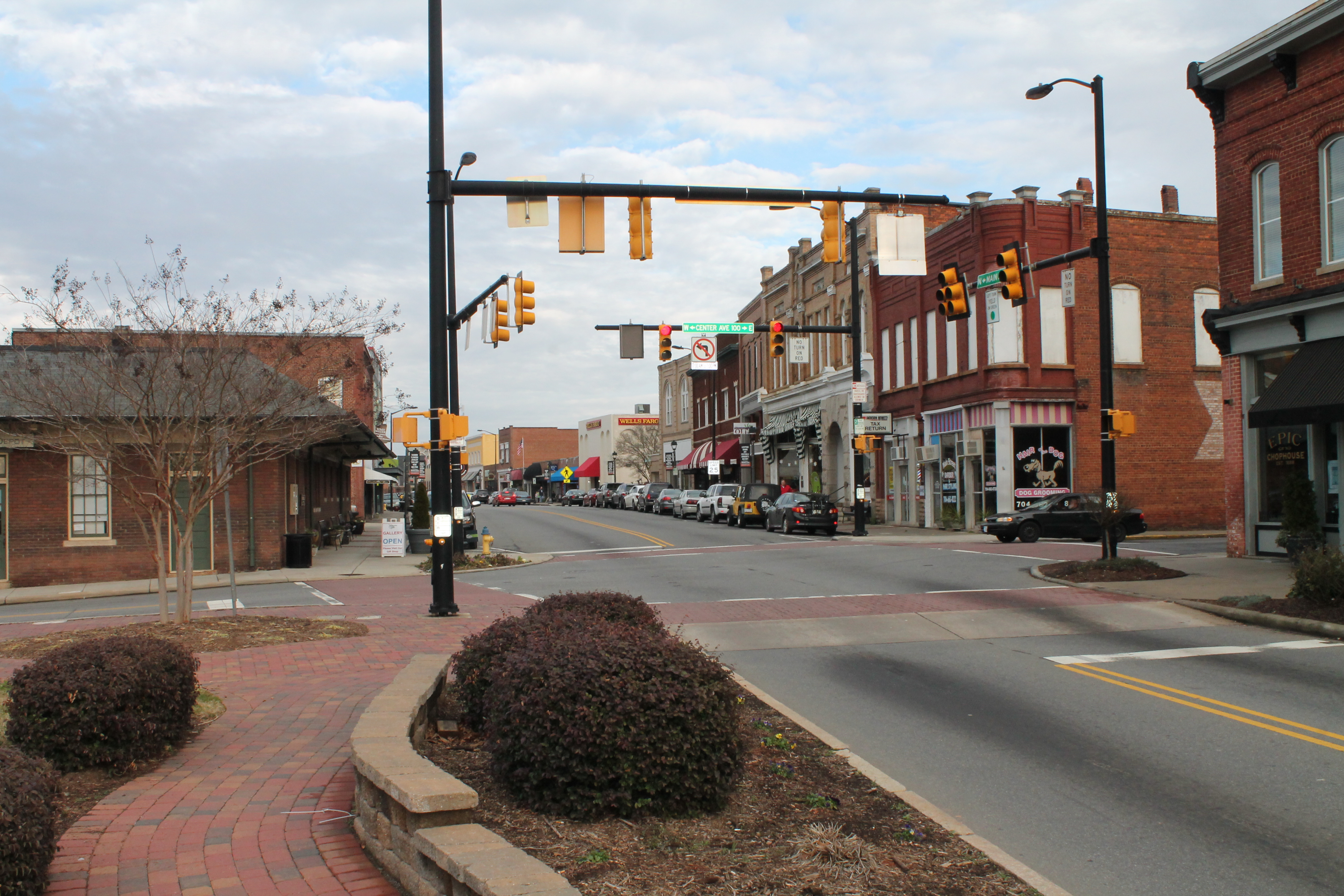

- Location within North Carolina Location within the United States
- Location: Portions of Main St., E. McLelland Ave., Broad St., and Academy St., Mooresville, North Carolina
- Coordinates: 35°34′59″N 80°48′45″W
- Area: 21 acres (8.5 ha)
- Architect: Multiple
- Architectural style: Renaissance, Italianate, Romanesque
- MPS: Iredell County MRA
- NRHP reference No.: 80002861 (original); 100005197 (increase)

Significant dates
- Added to NRHP: November 24, 1980
- Boundary increase: April 23, 2020

Mooresville Historic District is a national historic district located in Mooresville, Iredell County, North Carolina. It encompasses 62 contributing buildings and 8 contributing sites in the central business district and surrounding residential sections of Mooresville. The district includes notable examples of Italianate, Romanesque Revival, and Renaissance Revival architecture. Notable buildings include the Mooresville depot (c. 1920), the former Lorene Cotton Seed Oil Mill, First Presbyterian Church (1899), McLelland House, D. E. Turner Hardware Co. store, the former U. S. Post Office, and the McKnight Pontiac-Buick Co. (c. 1930).

It was listed on the National Register of Historic Places in 1980, with an enlargement approved in 2020.

== Gallery ==
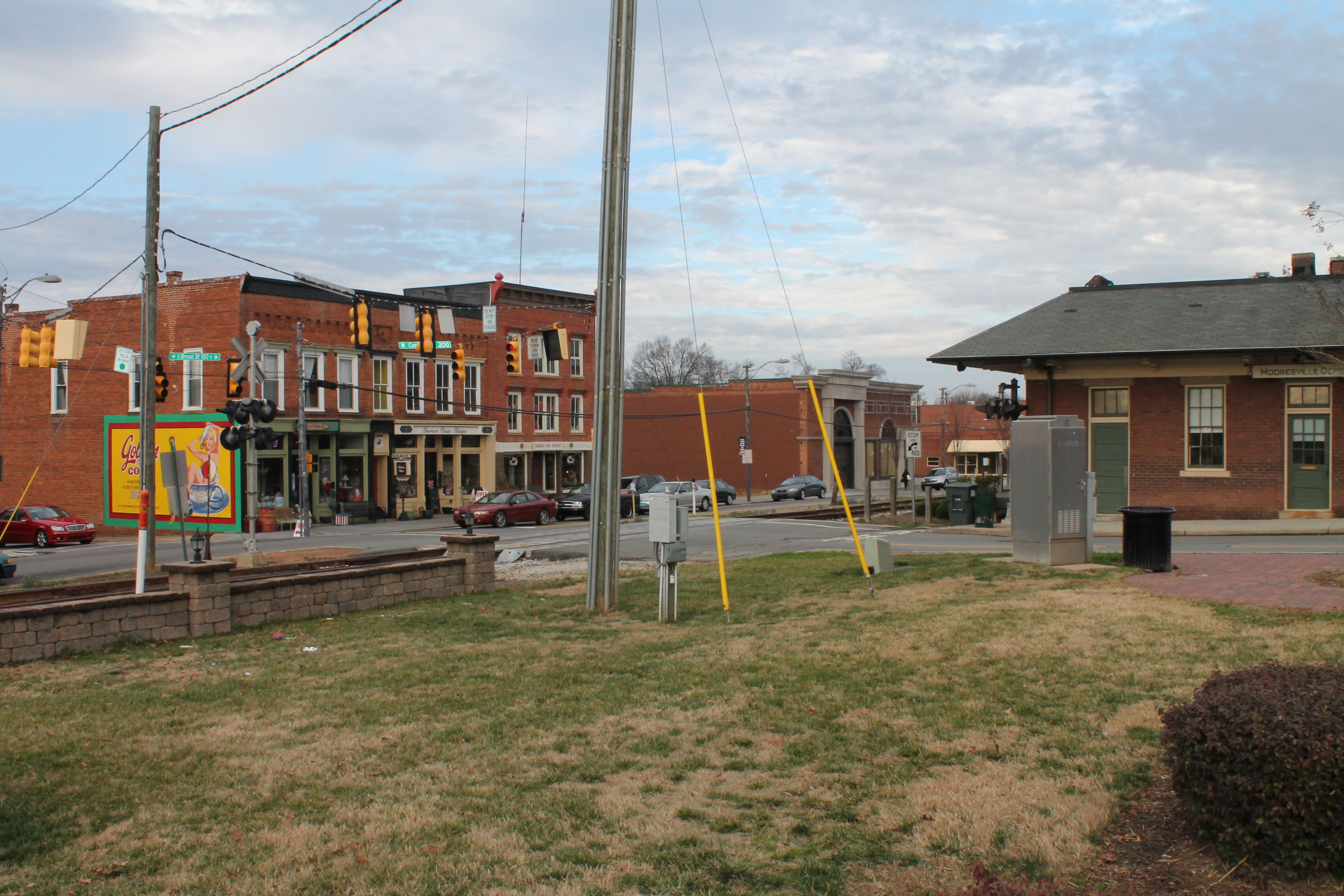
A present-day view down a busy street lined with buildings from 1890 to 1960; A view of Broad Street, part of the Historic District
