= Gale–Banks House =

Historic house in Massachusetts, United States

- U.S. National Register of Historic Places
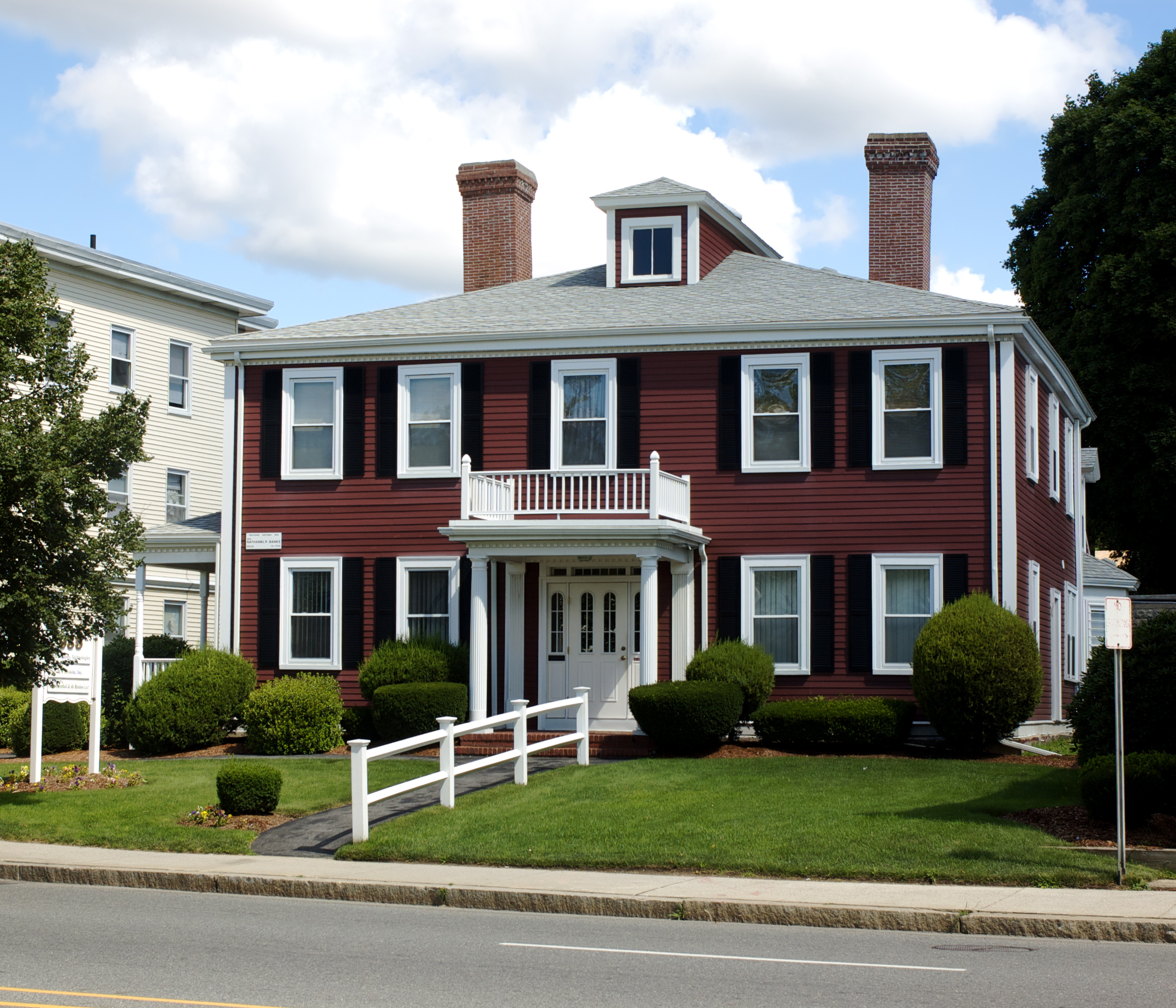

- Location within Massachusetts Location within the United States
- Location: 935 Main St., Waltham, Massachusetts
- Coordinates: 42°22′33″N 71°14′58″W
- Built: 1798
- Architectural style: Federal
- MPS: Waltham MRA
- NRHP reference No.: 89001545
- Added to NRHP: March 09, 1990

The Gale–Banks House is a historic house at 935 Main Street in Waltham, Massachusetts. This farmhouse was built c. 1798, and is one of the finest Federal style houses in the city. It is also significant for its association with Waltham native son, Governor of Massachusetts, and general of the American Civil War, Nathaniel Prentice Banks, who purchased it in 1855 and made it is home until his death in 1894. The house was listed on the National Register of Historic Places in 1990.

== Description and history ==
The Banks House is located on the north side of Main Street (United States Route 20), west of Waltham center and in an area that has significant commercial development. It is a two-story wood-frame structure, five bays wide, with a hip roof, clapboard siding, and two interior brick chimneys. It has a distinctive narrow hip-roof dormer, with windows facing north and south, at the apex of its roof. The main entrance is sheltered by a porch supported by fluted Doric columns and topped by a balustrade.

The house was built about 1798 by Jacob Gale, when the surrounding area was mostly farmland that had been in his family since the 17th century. It remained in the Gale family until 1855, when it was purchased by Nathaniel Prentice Banks along with 20 acres (8.1 ha) of land. Banks was a Waltham native who worked as a child in the mills of the Boston Manufacturing Company, and was by 1855 a prominent politician, having served as speaker of the state house of representatives. In 1857 he was elected Governor of Massachusetts, serving three one-year terms. He then served in the American Civil War as a general in the Union Army. After his death in 1894, the property was subdivided. The building now houses professional offices.

== See also ==
- National Register of Historic Places listings in Waltham, Massachusetts
