= Mack-Belk House =

Historic house in South Carolina, United States

- U.S. National Register of Historic Places
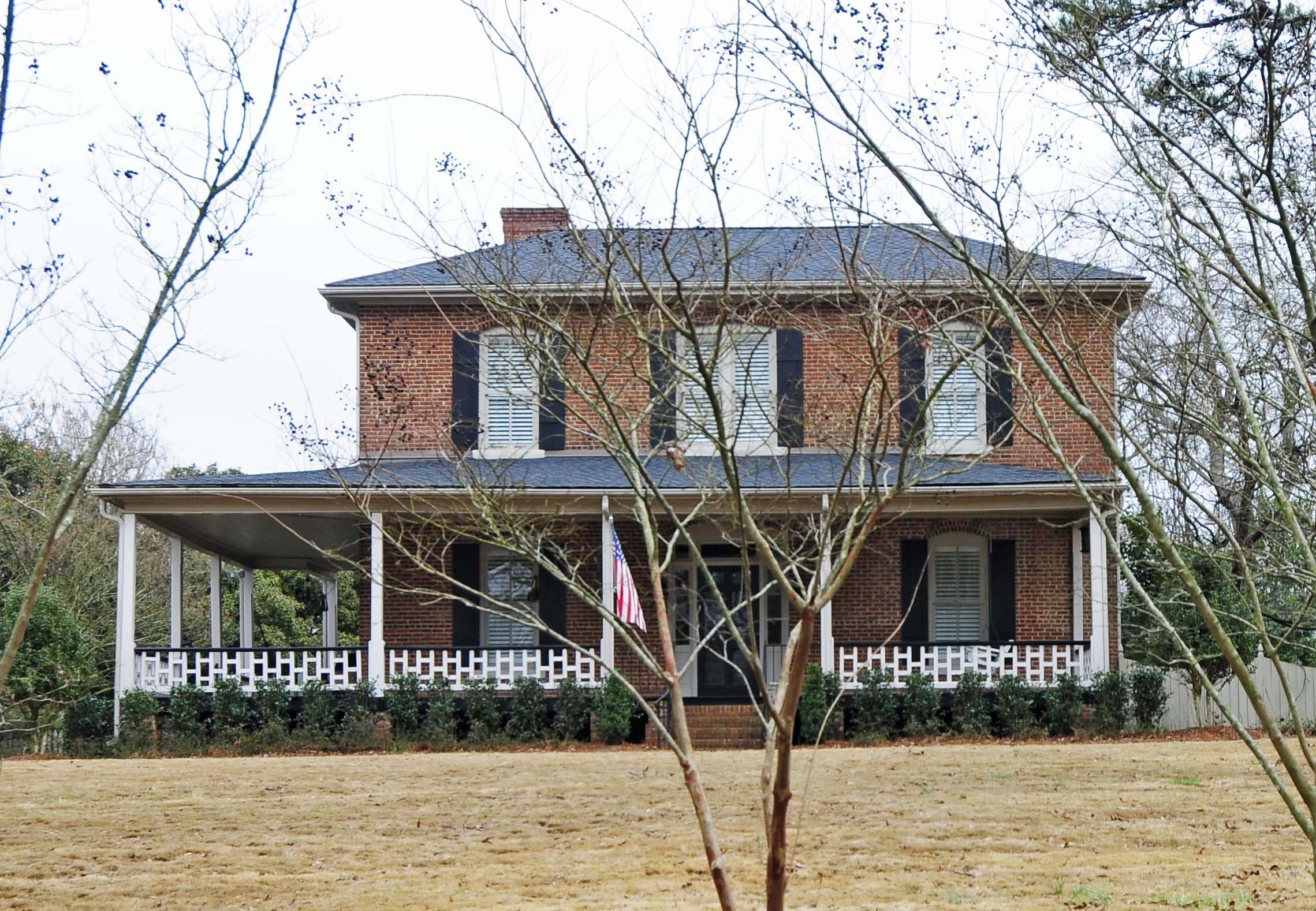
- Mack-Belk House, March 2012

- Location within South Carolina Location within the United States
- Location: 119 Banks St., Fort Mill, South Carolina
- Coordinates: 35°0′24″N 80°56′6″W
- Area: 1.9 acres (0.77 ha)
- Built: c. 1860, 1890
- Architectural style: Late Victorian
- MPS: Fort Mill MPS
- NRHP reference No.: 92000647
- Added to NRHP: June 11, 1992

Mack-Belk House is a historic home located at Fort Mill, York County, South Carolina. It consists of a one-story rear section built in the 1860s, with a two-story, three-bay, brick main block built about 1890. It features a one-story, hip roofed wraparound porch with Late Victorian design elements.

It was added to the National Register of Historic Places in 1992.
