= Mills House (Fort Mill, South Carolina) =

Historic house in South Carolina, United States

- U.S. National Register of Historic Places
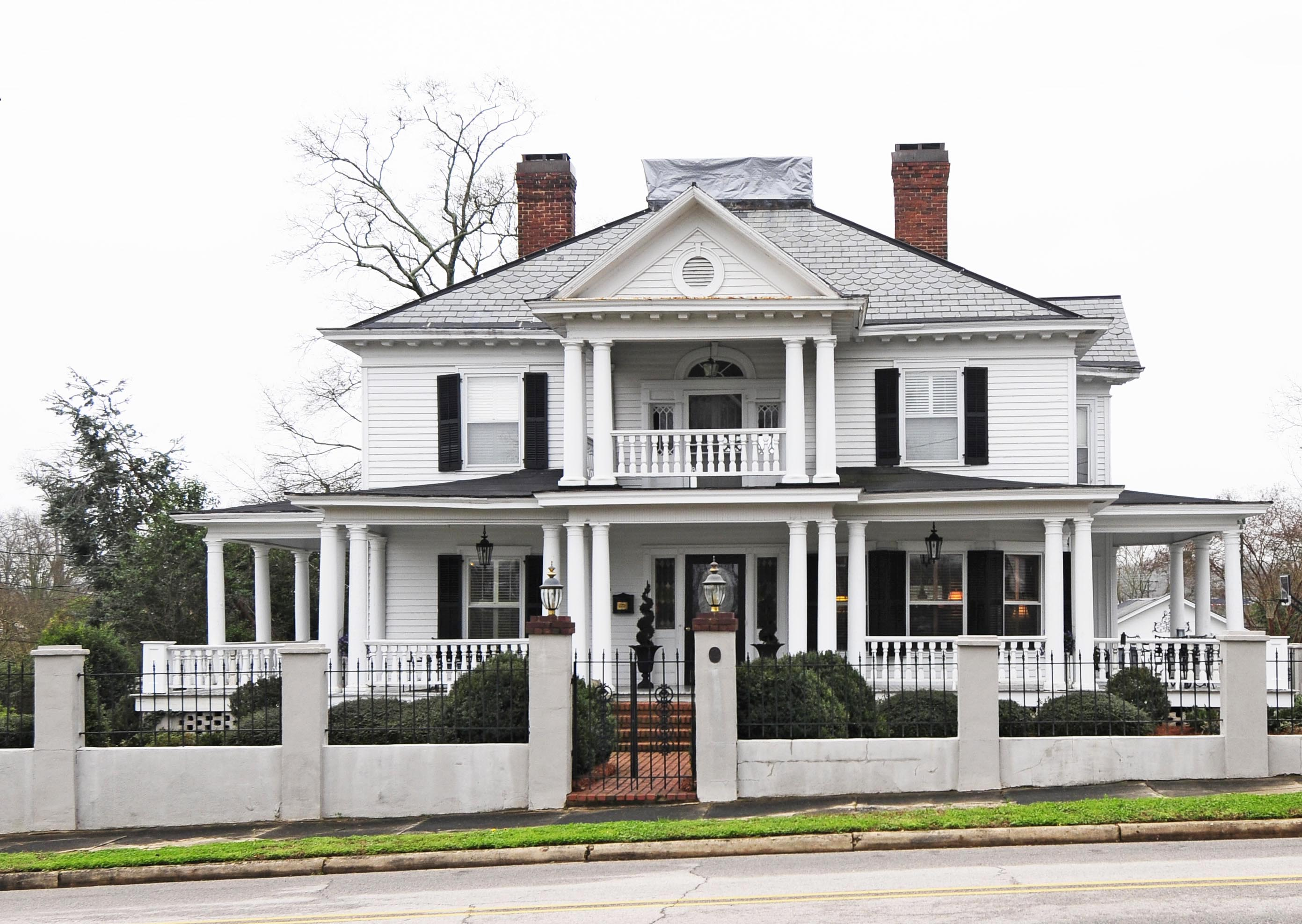
- Mills House, March 2012

- Location within South Carolina Location within the United States
- Location: 122 Confederate St., Fort Mill, South Carolina
- Coordinates: 35°0′23″N 80°56′36″W
- Area: less than one acre
- Built: 1906
- Architectural style: Classical Revival
- MPS: Fort Mill MPS
- NRHP reference No.: 92000645
- Added to NRHP: June 11, 1992

Mills House is a historic home located at Fort Mill, York County, South Carolina. It was built in 1906, and is a two-story, frame dwelling in the Classical Revival style with a slate hipped roof. The front façade features a central lower porch topped by an upper tier and flanked by side porches. All porches have Doric order columns and turned balusters.

It was added to the National Register of Historic Places in 1992.
