= Thornwell-Elliott House =

Historic house in South Carolina, United States

- U.S. National Register of Historic Places
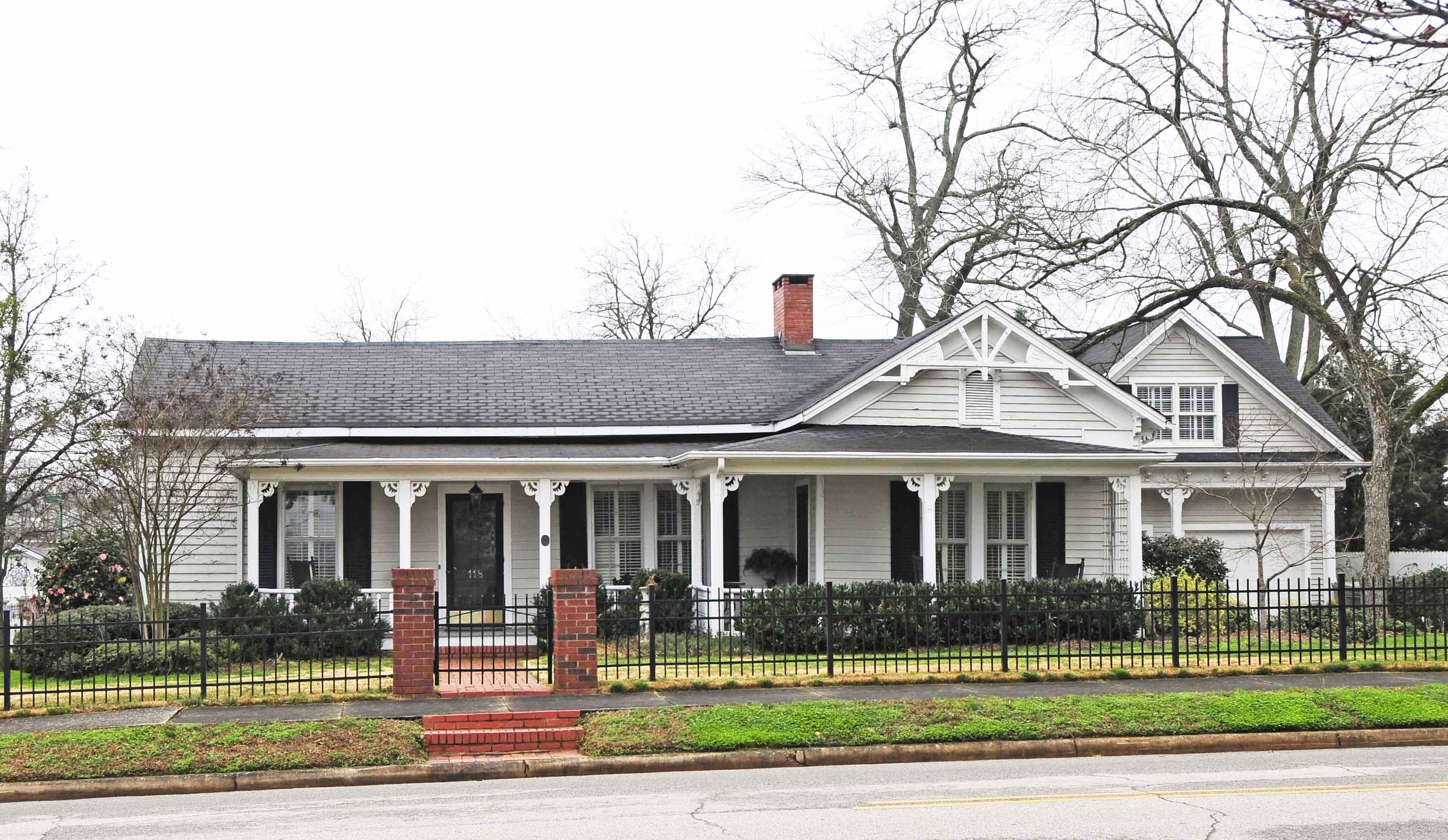
- Thornwell-Elliott House, March 2012

- Location within South Carolina Location within the United States
- Location: 118 Confederate St., Fort Mill, South Carolina
- Coordinates: 35°0′24″N 80°56′37″W
- Area: less than one acre
- Built: c. 1877
- Architectural style: Late Victorian
- MPS: Fort Mill MPS
- NRHP reference No.: 92000644
- Added to NRHP: June 11, 1992

Thornwell-Elliott House is a historic home located at Fort Mill, York County, South Carolina. It was built about 1877, and is a one-story, L-shaped frame dwelling in the Late Victorian style. The front façade features hip roofed porch with decorative brackets and turned balustrade.

It was added to the National Register of Historic Places in 1992.
