= National Guard Armory (Fort Mill, South Carolina) =

- U.S. National Register of Historic Places
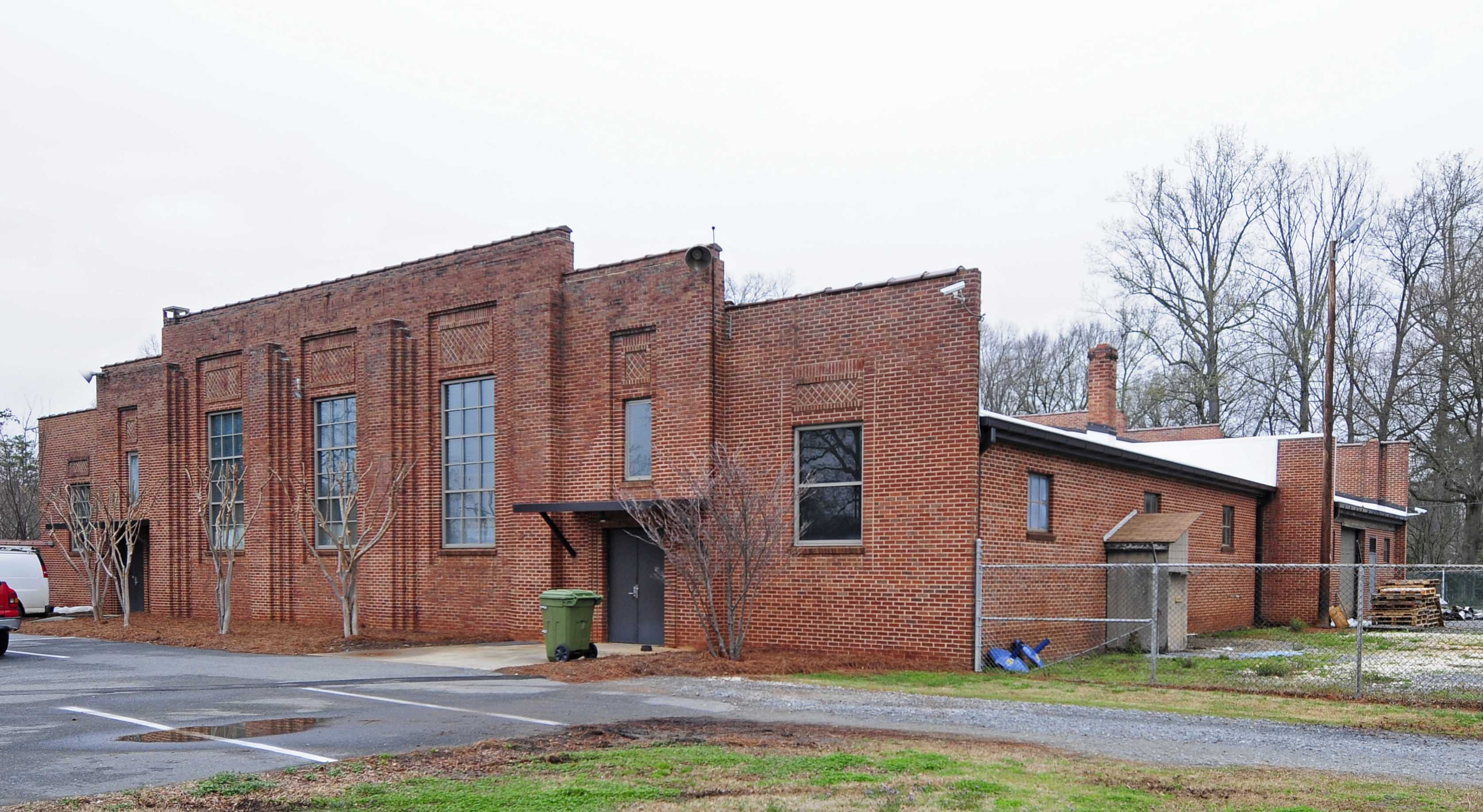
- National Guard Armory, March 2012

- Location within South Carolina Location within the United States
- Location: Jct. of Elliott and Unity Sts., Fort Mill, South Carolina
- Coordinates: 35°0′34″N 80°56′21″W
- Area: 2.2 acres (0.89 ha)
- Built: 1938
- Architectural style: Art Deco
- MPS: Fort Mill MPS
- NRHP reference No.: 92000648
- Added to NRHP: June 11, 1992

National Guard Armory is a historic National Guard armory located at Fort Mill, York County, South Carolina.

== History ==
The armory was built in 1938 with funds provided by the Works Progress Administration. The brick building consists of a central block with tall vertical windows, two flanking sections, and two end sections. The brickwork and windows are reflective of Art Deco style architecture.

It was added to the National Register of Historic Places in 1992.
