= Banks-Mack House =

Historic house in South Carolina, United States

- U.S. National Register of Historic Places
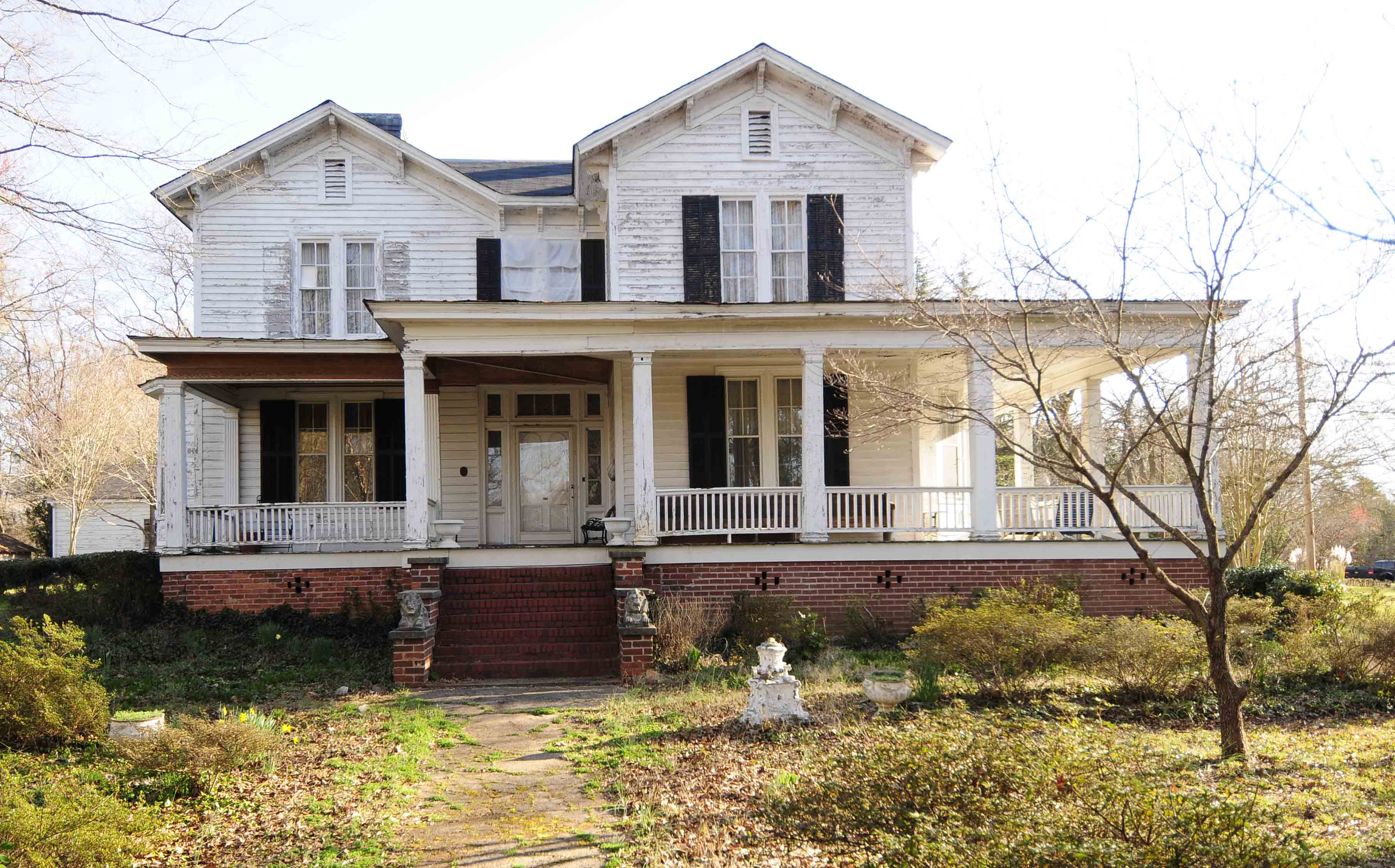
- Banks-Mack House, March 2012

- Location within South Carolina Location within the United States
- Location: 329 Confederate St., Fort Mill, South Carolina
- Coordinates: 35°0′11″N 80°56′18″W
- Area: 1 acre (0.40 ha)
- Built: c. 1871, 1910
- Built by: Stewart, W.H.
- Architectural style: Classical Revival
- MPS: Fort Mill MPS
- NRHP reference No.: 92000643
- Added to NRHP: June 11, 1992

Banks-Mack House is a historic home located at Fort Mill, York County, South Carolina. It was built about 1871, and enlarged and renovated in the Classical Revival style in 1910. It is a two-story, frame dwelling with a one-story, hip roofed wraparound porch. The porch once encompassed a large hickory tree that was removed because of damage from Hurricane Hugo in September 1989.

It was added to the National Register of Historic Places in 1992.
