= Springfield Plantation House (Fort Mill, South Carolina) =

Historic house in South Carolina, United States

- U.S. National Register of Historic Places
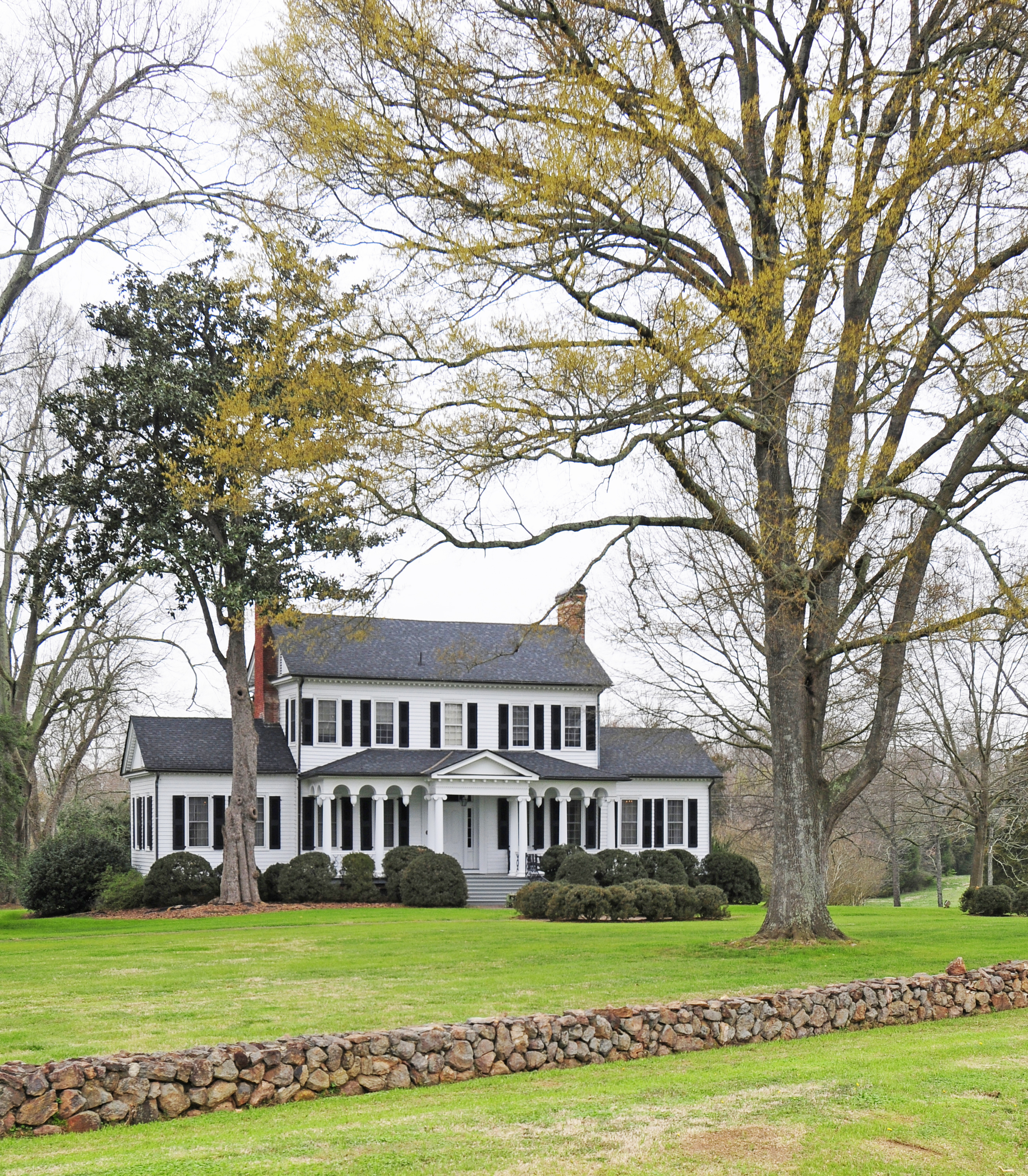

- Location within South Carolina Location within the United States
- Nearest city: Fort Mill, South Carolina
- Coordinates: 35°2′54″N 80°55′41″W
- Area: 2.7 acres (1.1 ha)
- Built: 1806
- NRHP reference No.: 85002387
- Added to NRHP: September 12, 1985

Springfield Plantation House is the oldest wood-frame house in Fort Mill, South Carolina and was the site of one of the last meetings of the Confederate cabinet. It was listed on the National Register of Historic Places in 1985.

== History ==
The house was originally constructed between 1790 and 1806 by John Springs III and his wife first occupied the house. At one time, the plantation was 3,200 acres (1,300 ha). In the 1850s, the house was extensively remodeled by Andrew Baxter Springs and his architect, Jacob Graves of Columbia. In 1946, Elliot White Springs put on an addition toward the rear, and modernized the house with electricity, plumbing and central heat.

The house and plantation was the site of one of the last meetings of the Confederate cabinet. President Jefferson Davis and several of his cabinet officers spent the night of April 26, 1865 at the plantation. The next day, they held a meeting to plan their further retreat. The owner of the plantation, Andrew Baxter Springs, recommended that they travel separately to avoid capture.

== Architecture ==
The house is a two-story, white weatherboard house with a gable roof and pedimented gable ends. There are two one-story wings on either side with gable roofs. There is a one-story porch with hipped roof supported by eight Ionic columns. There are five windows across the second story and four windows and a double entrance door across the first story. Each wing has two windows on the front side of the house. The main block as brick corbeled chimneys on both ends. There is a two-story addition toward the rear. The house has a composition roof.
