= Fort Mill, South Carolina =

Fort Mill
- Town
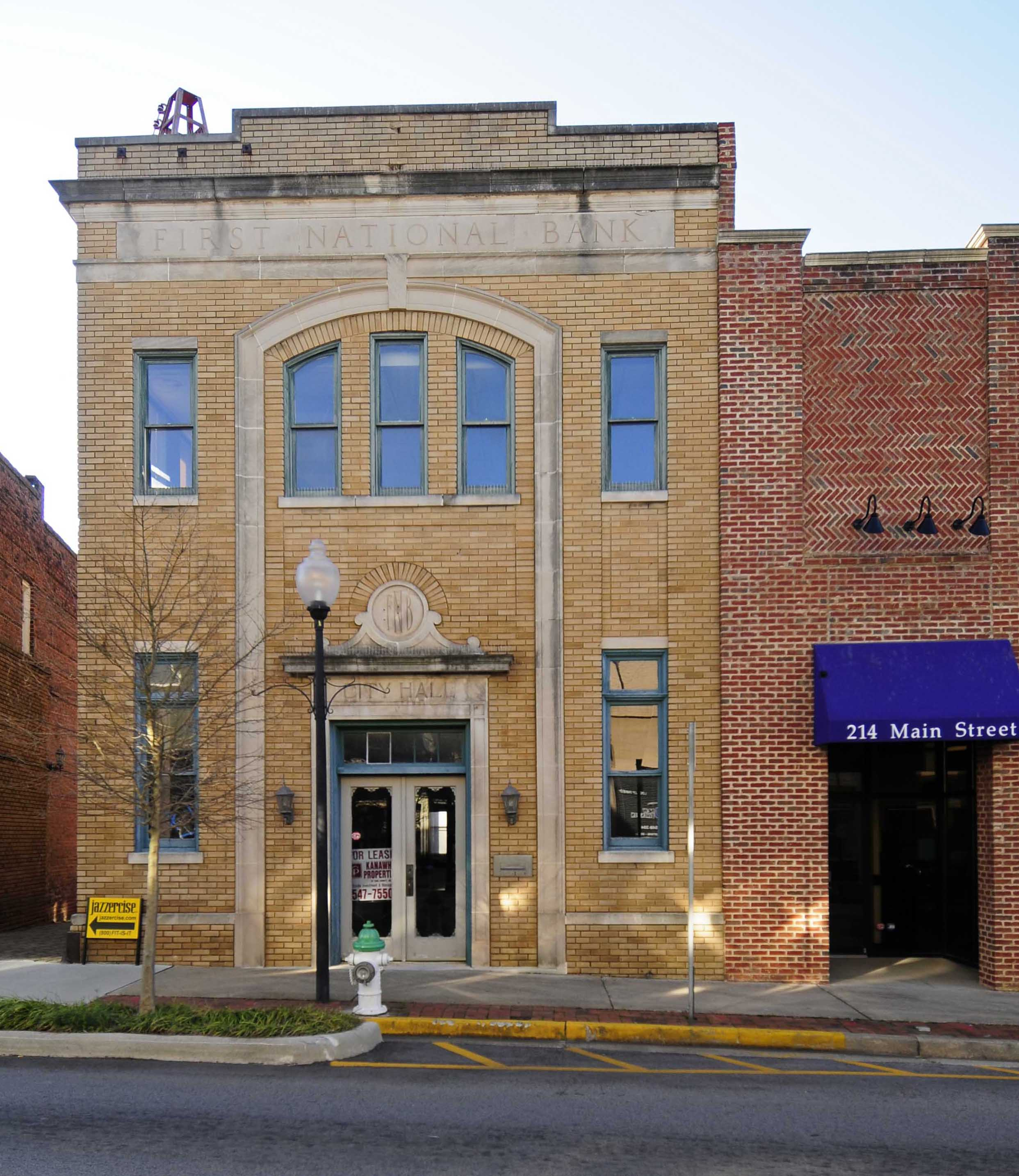
- Fort Mill Downtown Historic District

- Seal

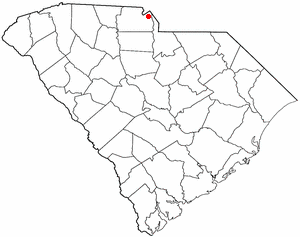
- Location in South Carolina
- Coordinates: 34°59′31″N 80°56′19″W
- Country: United States
- State: South Carolina
- Counties: York
- Established: 1873
- Named for: Colonial-era British fort

Government
  - Type: Council–manager
  - Mayor: Guynn Savage

Area
  - Total: 19.97 sq mi (51.72 km^{2})
  - Land: 19.71 sq mi (51.04 km^{2})
  - Water: 0.26 sq mi (0.68 km^{2}) 1.30%
- Elevation: 646 ft (197 m)

Population (2020)
  - Total: 24,521
  - Density: 1,244.3/sq mi (480.43/km^{2})
- Time zone: UTC−5 (Eastern (EST))
  - Summer (DST): UTC−4 (Eastern Daylight Time)
- ZIP codes: 29715, 29716, 29708
- Area codes: 803, 839
- FIPS code: 45-26890
- GNIS feature ID: 2406509
- Website: fortmillsc.gov

Fort Mill, also known as Fort Mill Township, is a town in York County, South Carolina, United States. It is a suburb of Charlotte, North Carolina. As of the 2020 census, the population of the town was 24,521. Some businesses and residents in the Indian Land community of neighboring Lancaster County share a Fort Mill mailing address, but the official town boundary extends only within York County.

== History ==
The town of Fort Mill was established in 1873, getting its name from its location between two points, the first, a fort constructed by British in colonial times to protect the Catawba Indians from marauding tribes to the north, and the second point of Webb's Mill. The Catawba Indians made their home in present-day Fort Mill for many years. Scots-Irish settlers began arriving in the 1750s and 1760s and a small settlement soon developed. Fort Mill grew rapidly in the late 19th century as textile mills were established. After many textile mill shut-downs the town continued to grow rapidly and became a major suburb of Charlotte.

Highlights in Fort Mill's history include:

- In the mid-18th century, William Spratt and his wife Elizabeth were traveling through upper South Carolina in their wagon. They spent a night among the friendly Catawba Indians and were invited to stay and live in the area on a large tract of land given to them. They became the first white settlers in the Fort Mill area and their descendants still reside there. Their descendant, John Spratt, represented the area in the U.S. House of Representatives from 1983 to 2011.
- The town of Fort Mill was the site of the last Confederate Government Cabinet meeting (1865). Jefferson Davis and the Confederate Cabinet passed through the area during their flight from Richmond in 1865. The last meeting of the full Confederate Cabinet was held at the White Homestead in Fort Mill. At the meeting, the cabinet dissolved the Confederacy, thus technically making it also the official spot of where the Confederacy ended. It should be mentioned, however, that other regions still attempted to continue the fight. Fort Mill's Confederate Park contains the nation's only monument to slaves laboring on the Confederate side of the American Civil War.
- In the 1970s and 1980s, Fort Mill was the home to TV evangelist Jim Bakker's now defunct Heritage USA (now reopened as Heritage International Ministries).

The Banks-Mack House, Fort Mill Downtown Historic District, Mack-Belk House, Mills House, Nation Ford Road, National Guard Armory, Spratt Cemetery, Springfield Plantation House, Thornwell-Elliott House, Unity Presbyterian Church Complex, John M. White House, William Elliott White House, and Wilson House are listed on the National Register of Historic Places.

== Geography ==
According to the United States Census Bureau, the town has a total area of 19.97 square miles (51.7 km^{2}), of which 19.71 square miles (51.0 km^{2}) is land and 0.26 square miles (0.67 km^{2}) (1.30%) is water. Interstate 77 passes through the western portions of the town, and exit 85 is signed "South Carolina Highway 160/Fort Mill." SC 160 is the main east–west street in Fort Mill.

The town of Fort Mill held a final public hearing in October 2008 on a proposed annexation that doubled the town's physical size. Fort Mill has three golf courses. The town also maintains six parks: Harris Street Park, Steele Street Park, Doby Bridge Park, Calhoun Street Park, Veterans Park and Walter Elisha Park. Three of the six parks have picnic shelters, children's playgrounds, and restrooms. Doby Bridge and Harris Street Parks have lighted baseball fields, with Steele Street and Harris Street Parks having basketball courts, and Steele Street Park having a small water park. The town also maintains a banquet hall rentable through the parks and recreation department.

=== Climate ===
Fort Mill is located in a humid subtropical climate, Cfa in the Köppen climate classification. This means that the city experiences four distinct seasons, although the variation between the seasons is not as pronounced as in other parts of the United States. Generally, daytime maximum temperatures in the summer are around 90 °F (32 °C), with nighttime low temperatures of approximately 70 °F (21 °C). In winter, daytime maxima average around 50 °F (10 °C) while nighttime low temperatures are near 30 °F (−1 °C). Occasional readings as high as 105 °F (41 °C) are seen, reaching a high of 108 °F (42 °C) in 2007 or as low as −5 °F (−21 °C) in 1989. Summers are generally humid and prone to thunderstorms, while winters are rainy with sleet and occasional snow. Snow might fall during the winter but usually does not accumulate or persist as ground cover. Fort Mill experiences rainfall related to tropical cyclones but is generally too far inland to experience damaging winds. Fort Mill has not had any direct hits from any tropical systems since 1989, when Hurricane Hugo devastated the area.

The most common soil in Fort Mill is Cecil series.

== Demographics ==
Historical population
Census	Pop.	Note	%±
1880	290		—
1890	689		137.6%
1900	1,394		102.3%
1910	1,616		15.9%
1920	1,940		20.0%
1930	2,112		8.9%
1940	2,919		38.2%
1950	3,204		9.8%
1960	3,315		3.5%
1970	4,505		35.9%
1980	4,162		−7.6%
1990	4,930		18.5%
2000	7,587		53.9%
2010	10,811		42.5%
2020	24,521		126.8%
2025 (est.)	38,673	▲	57.7%
U.S. Decennial Census

=== 2020 census ===
As of the 2020 census, Fort Mill had a population of 24,521. The median age was 36.7 years. 30.8% of residents were under the age of 18 and 11.5% of residents were 65 years of age or older. For every 100 females there were 91.5 males, and for every 100 females age 18 and over there were 87.0 males age 18 and over.

100.0% of residents lived in urban areas, while 0.0% lived in rural areas.

There were 8,795 households in Fort Mill, including 4,854 families. Of all households, 46.4% had children under the age of 18 living in them. Of all households, 61.6% were married-couple households, 10.8% were households with a male householder and no spouse or partner present, and 23.6% were households with a female householder and no spouse or partner present. About 19.4% of all households were made up of individuals, and 7.1% had someone living alone who was 65 years of age or older.

There were 9,210 housing units, of which 4.5% were vacant. The homeowner vacancy rate was 1.7% and the rental vacancy rate was 6.6%.

Fort Mill racial composition
Race	Num.	Perc.
White (non-Hispanic)	17,210	70.18%
Black or African American (non-Hispanic)	2,965	12.09%
Native American	81	0.33%
Asian	1,294	5.28%
Pacific Islander	4	0.02%
Other/Mixed	1,296	5.29%
Hispanic or Latino	1,671	6.81%

=== 2010 census ===
At the 2010 census, there were 10,811 people, 4,168 households, and 2,184 families residing in the town. The population density was 661.6 people per square mile. There were 4,479 housing units at an average density of 676.9 per square mile. The racial makeup of the town was 77.6% White, 17.6% African American, 0.4% Native American, 1.3% Asian, and 2.1% from two or more races. Hispanic or Latino of any race were 2.9% of the population.

There were 2,890 households, out of which 43.8% had children under the age of 18 living with them, 56.2% were married couples living together, 17.2% had a female householder with no husband present, and 24.4% were non-families. 21.8% of all households were made up of individuals, and 8.4% had someone living alone who was 65 years of age or older. The average household size was 2.67 and the average family size was 3.14.

In the town, the population was spread out, with 31.1% under the age of 18, 6.1% from 18 to 24, 32.4% from 25 to 44, 20.0% from 45 to 64, and 11.1% who were 65 years of age or older. The median age was 33.7 years. For every 100 females, there were 86.7 males. For every 100 females age 18 and over, there were 79.0 males.

The median income for a household in the town was $68,250, and the median income for a family was $79,495. Males had a median income of $58,986 versus $40,819 for females. The per capita income for the town was $36,548. About 7.2% of families and 9.5% of the population were below the poverty line, including 13.6% of those under age 18 and 8.1% of those age 65 or over.

== Economy ==
The Fort Mill area is home to notable businesses such as the headquarters of Carolina Crown Drum and Bugle Corps (who were DCI World Champions in 2013), LPL Financial, Continental Tire the Americas (Lancaster County), LLC., Schaeffler Group, CompuCom Systems, Diversey, Inc., Sunbelt Rentals, Domtar, Springs Industries, Shutterfly, Red Ventures (Lancaster County), Daimler Trucks North America, and Puckerbutt Pepper Company, known for originally producing the Carolina Reaper and Pepper X. Bridgetree, a data collection service, is located here.

== Arts and culture ==
Fort Mill is home to numerous attractions and, while a growing town, it has access to many amenities outside its jurisdiction in the nearby cities of Charlotte and Rock Hill.

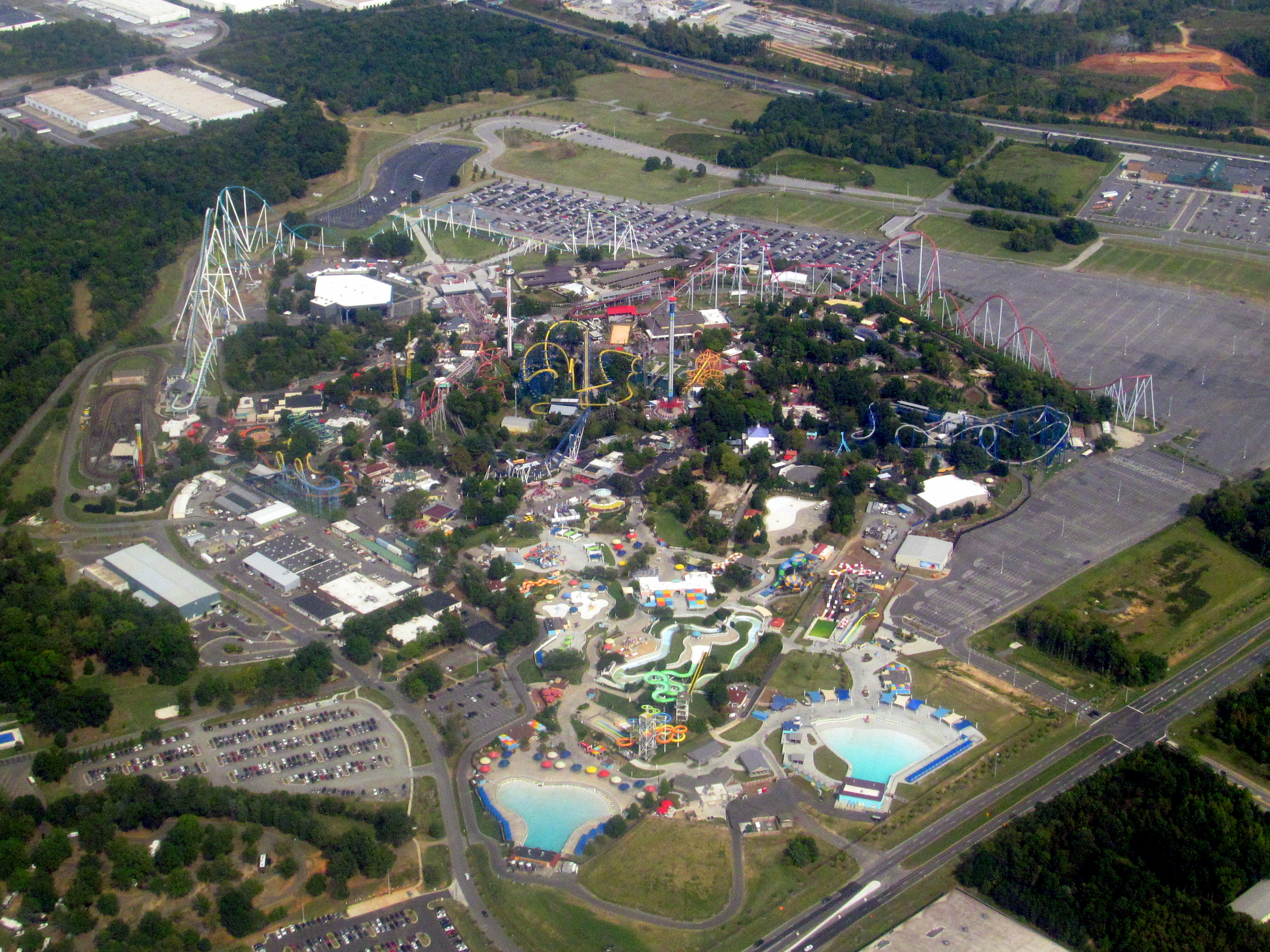
- An aerial view of the amusement park Carowinds in 2017
  A portion of Cedar Fair's Carowinds amusement park is located in Fort Mill.
- Upper Room Chapel is a replica of Jerusalem's Upper Room where the Last Supper was held.
- Fort Mill Downtown Historic District is the location of Confederate Park, Memorial Park, and several retail shops. The Fort Mill Times (ceased publication 2020) and Fort Mill Magazine are also located on Main Street. One of the Confederate monuments in Confederate Park is the loyal slaves monument, dedicated to the proposition that slaves were loyal and gladly helpful to the Confederacy.
- Annually, Fort Mill is home to the St. Phillip Neri Italian Festival at the local Catholic parish and the Strawberry Festival held at Walter Elisha Park.
- Fort Mill's town hall is located in the former Springs Executive Offices, with the building itself listed on the U.S. National Register of Historic Places in 1992. The build's windows were modeled after the ill-fated Hindenburg, which the Spring family rode before its crash, designed to reduce glare.

Fort Mill is also known for its peach orchards and the Anne Springs Close Greenway, an extensive nature preserve consisting of approximately 2,300 acres (9.3 km^{2}) of lakes, forests, and pastures that provide trails for hiking, biking, and horseback riding.

== Media ==
Fort Mill is covered by a local newspaper, The Tega Cay Sun. The Tega Cay Sun started as a daily online newspaper and is now printed monthly. Magazines include Life in the Mill and 29708.

== Sports ==
Fort Mill is the Home of the PrimeTime Players, a Minor League Basketball Franchise who currently plays in the East Coast Basketball League . The PrimeTime Players are four-time Minor League champions, having won Championships in the TRBL 2012-2014 and the ECBL in 2015. The PrimeTime Players play their home games at Banks Street Gym at 490 Academy Street.

Fort Mill is also home to Carolina Crown, a competitive drum and bugle corps. As a member of Drum Corps International (DCI), Carolina Crown won one World Class championship (2013), won the silver medal three times (2009, 2012, 2015), the bronze medal four times (2016, 2017, 2023, 2026), and one Division II championship (1993).

== Government ==
The government of Fort Mill takes place within the framework of a Council-Manager Form. Currently, the town council of Fort Mill consists of six board members, two of whom serve from at-large districts, while the remainder of the council represent each of four wards. Elections are held in accordance with United States election regulations every two years, and council members serve staggered four year terms. The town council meets the second Monday of each month. The town of Fort Mill currently has four boards and commissions. These are the Zoning Board of Appeals, the Planning Commission, the Historical Review Board, and the Housing Authority Board. Members of boards and commissions are appointed on a volunteer basis.

The current mayor is Guynn Savage, who was sworn on January 12, 2016.

Fort Mill is currently represented by the following legislators:

- U.S. Senate: Senior Senator Tim Scott (R) and Junior Senator Darline Graham (R)
- U.S. House of Representatives: Ralph Norman (R), as part of South Carolina's 5th congressional district
- South Carolina Senate: Michael Johnson (R) as part of South Carolina Senate district 16
- South Carolina House of Representatives: David Martin (R) as part of South Carolina House district 26.

Fort Mill and northern portions of its township are represented in the South Carolina House by R. Raye Felder (R) as part of South Carolina House district 26.

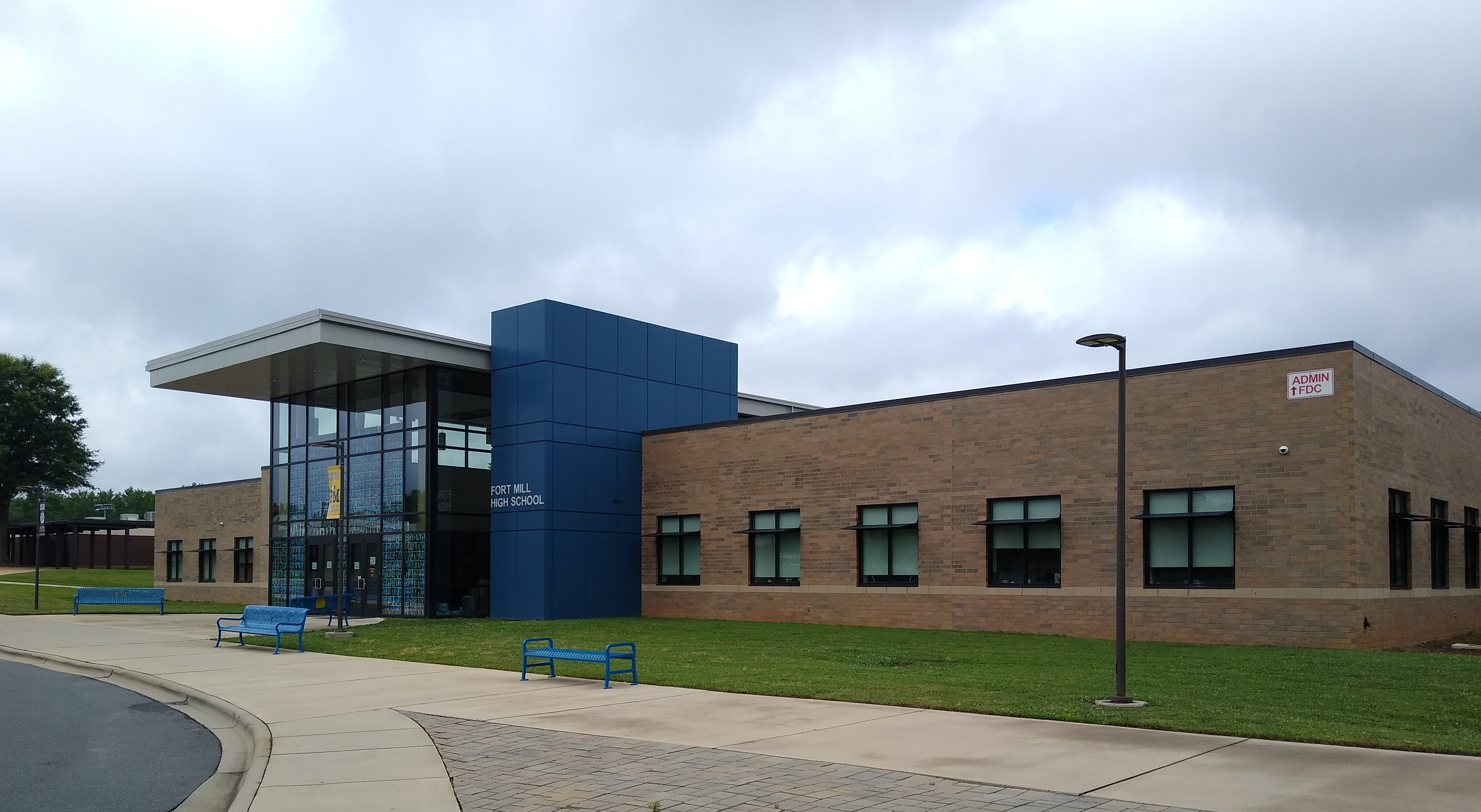
Fort Mill High School

== Education ==
Fort Mill is the primary community within the York County School District 4, which also serves children from the nearby community of Tega Cay.

Fort Mill has a public library, a branch of the York County Library.

Fort Mill is ranked 1st in the state in terms of both education and public schools.

== Notable people ==
- Steve Byrnes – NASCAR on Fox reporter
- Ed Currie – breeder of the world's hottest peppers, the Carolina Reaper and Pepper X
- Thomas Lee Hall – World War I Medal of Honor recipient
- Cheslie Kryst – Miss USA 2019
- Rick Newsom – NASCAR Winston Cup driver
- Randy Primas – first African-American Mayor of Camden, New Jersey (1981–1990)
- Joshua Rudd – [4 Star General, US Army] Commander, United States Cyber Command
- Charlie Rymer – golf commentator, member of Georgia Tech Athletics Hall of Fame, winner of U.S. Junior Amateur in 1985
- Elliot White Springs – World War I flying ace, author, industrialist, and a member of the South Carolina Hall of Fame
- Melvin Stewart – American swimmer, two-time Olympic gold medalist, co-founder of SwimSwam
- Vance Walker – NFL defensive tackle for the Denver Broncos
- Isabella Robusto – stock car racing driver
- James E. Williams – Medal of Honor recipient and U.S. Marshal of South Carolina
- Ricky Wysocki – professional disc golfer

== See also ==
- List of municipalities in South Carolina
