= William Elliott White House =

Historic house in South Carolina, United States

- U.S. National Register of Historic Places
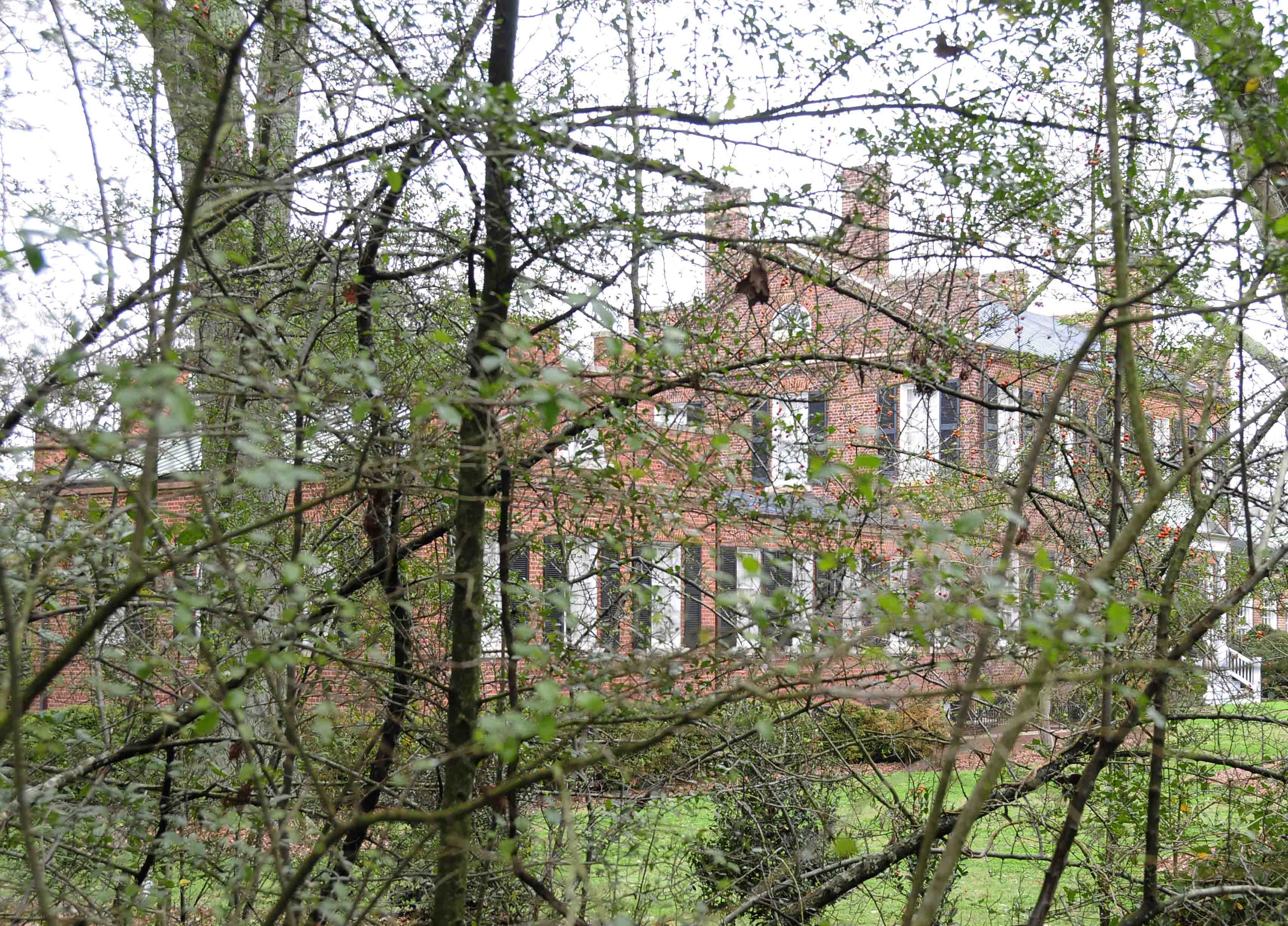
- William Elliott White House, March 2012

- Location within South Carolina Location within the United States
- Location: N. White St., near Fort Mill, South Carolina
- Coordinates: 35°0′57″N 80°57′1″W
- Area: 8 acres (3.2 ha)
- Built: 1831, 1922, 1936, 1955
- Built by: Hoover, Thomas B.
- Architectural style: Federal
- NRHP reference No.: 87000381
- Added to NRHP: March 22, 1987

William Elliott White House -- also known as Elliott White Springs House—is a historic home located near Fort Mill, York County, South Carolina. It was built in 1831, and is a two-story brick house with Federal design elements. It features an elegant portico. The east wing was added in 1922, the west wing in 1936, and the greenhouse/pool in 1955. The house is one of the sites believed to have held the last full meeting of the Cabinet of the Confederate States of America. It was the home of Elliott White Springs, South Carolina textile magnate and writer of short stories in the 1920s and 1930s.

It was added to the National Register of Historic Places in 1987.
