= Blairsville =

Blairsville or Blairville may refer to:

== United States ==
- Blairsville, Georgia
- Blairsville, Indiana
- Blairville, Michigan
- Blairville, New York
- Blairsville, Ohio
- Blairsville, Pennsylvania
- Blairsville, South Carolina
- Blairsville, Williamson County, Illinois
- Blairsville, Hamilton County, Illinois

== France ==
- Blairville, Pas-de-Calais
