= Lesslie, South Carolina =

- CDP
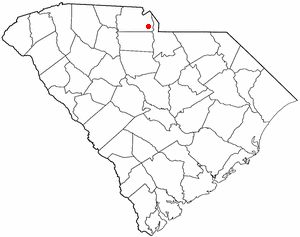
- Coordinates: 34°52′32″N 80°57′13″W
- Country: United States
- State: South Carolina
- County: York

Area
  - Total: 6.11 sq mi (15.83 km^{2})
  - Land: 6.06 sq mi (15.70 km^{2})
  - Water: 0.050 sq mi (0.13 km^{2})
- Elevation: 682 ft (208 m)

Population (2020)
  - Total: 3,068
  - Density: 506.0/sq mi (195.36/km^{2})
- Time zone: UTC-5 (Eastern (EST))
  - Summer (DST): UTC-4 (EDT)
- Zip Code: 29730, 29704
- Area code: 803
- FIPS code: 45-41065
- GNIS feature ID: 2403231

Lesslie is a census-designated place located in York County, South Carolina, United States, southeast of the city of Rock Hill. In 2010, Lesslie had a total population of 2,882 people.

While Lesslie is sometimes considered to be a town, it is not incorporated and does not have a town council or mayor. Lesslie is a fast-growing suburban area a part of the Charlotte Metro along Interstate 77, which can be accessed from exits 75 and 77.

== Geography ==
Lesslie is located approximately 3 miles (4.8 km) southeast from Rock Hill.

Lesslie has a total area of 6.0 square miles (16 km^{2}).

== Climate and meteorology ==
Lesslie has a Humid subtropical climate, Cfa in the Köppen climate classification, characterized as humid, wet summers and cool, dry winters. The coldest temperature in the area was -6 °F while the warmest was 108 °F, both recorded at the Rock Hill Municipal Airport. Lesslie receives a large amount of precipitation throughout the year, with at least 3.3 in (84 mm) of precipitation occurring each month on average.

== Demographics ==
Historical population
Census	Pop.	Note	%±
2020	3,068		—
U.S. Decennial Census

=== 2020 census ===
As of the 2020 census, Lesslie had a population of 3,068. The median age was 40.7 years. 24.1% of residents were under the age of 18 and 14.7% were 65 years of age or older. For every 100 females, there were 95.9 males, and for every 100 females age 18 and over, there were 95.8 males age 18 and over.

61.1% of residents lived in urban areas, while 38.9% lived in rural areas.

There were 1,147 households in Lesslie, including 852 family households. Of all households, 34.3% had children under the age of 18 living in them, 59.1% were married-couple households, 14.7% were households with a male householder and no spouse or partner present, and 20.1% were households with a female householder and no spouse or partner present. About 21.7% of all households were made up of individuals, and 7.5% had someone living alone who was 65 years of age or older.

There were 1,203 housing units, of which 4.7% were vacant. The homeowner vacancy rate was 0.5% and the rental vacancy rate was 5.1%.

Lesslie racial composition
Race	Num.	Perc.
White (non-Hispanic)	2,329	75.91%
Black or African American (non-Hispanic)	328	10.69%
Native American	51	1.66%
Asian	56	1.83%
Pacific Islander	1	0.03%
Other/Mixed	141	4.6%
Hispanic or Latino	162	5.28%

=== 2000 census ===
As of the census of 2000, there were 2,268 people, 888 households, and 666 families residing in the CDP. The population density was 381.8 inhabitants per square mile (147.4/km^{2}). There were 961 housing units at an average density of 161.8 per square mile (62.5/km^{2}). The racial makeup of the CDP was 93.30% White, 3.97% African American, 1.37% Native American, 0.26% Asian, 0.00% Pacific Islander, 0.18% from other races, and 0.93% from two or more races. 0.49% of the population were Hispanic or Latino of any race.

There were 888 households, out of which 32.9% had children under the age of 18 living with them, 60.4% were married couples living together, 9.7% had a female householder with no husband present, and 25.0% were non-families. 20.3% of all households were made up of individuals, and 6.2% had someone living alone who was 65 years of age or older. The average household size was 2.55 and the average family size was 2.94.

In the CDP, the population was spread out, with 24.3% under the age of 18, 7.8% from 18 to 24, 31.7% from 25 to 44, 25.3% from 45 to 64, and 10.8% who were 65 years of age or older. The median age was 37 years. For every 100 females, there were 100.9 males. For every 100 females age 18 and over, there were 100.5 males.

The median income for a household in the CDP was $44,167, and the median income for a family was $52,125. Males had a median income of $35,441 versus $26,507 for females. The per capita income for the CDP was $19,215. 6.6% of the population and 4.9% of families were below the poverty line. 5.8% of those under the age of 18 and 7.0% of those 65 and older were living below the poverty line.

== See also ==
- Riverview, South Carolina
- India Hook, South Carolina
