= Lake Wylie Park =

Closed park in Charlotte, North Carolina

- Location: Steele Creek, North Carolina
- Coordinates: 35.1459°N 81.0185°W
- Area: 68 acres (28 ha)
- Opened: 1967
- Closed: 1974
- Administered by: Mecklenburg County, North Carolina Parks and Recreation
- Water: Lake Wylie

Lake Wylie Park was a Mecklenburg Parks and Recreation-operated park on the shores of Lake Wylie in Steele Creek, North Carolina. The park offered boat access, swimming, picnic space and overnight camping. It was closed in 1974 and replaced with McDowell Park, now McDowell Nature Preserve.

== History ==
The park, Mecklenburg County's first, originated with a 1964 agreement with Duke Power to lease land to the county for $1 a year for the development of a park. Local youth developed the land, clearing trees and constructing park facilities, as part of a work program funded with a $137,000 grant (equivalent to $1,327,706 in 2024) from the United States Department of Labor. The park opened in 1967 and was an initial success with 135,000 visitors in its first year.

The park's popularity also brought disorder. All-night drunken parties left the park covered in glass and garbage, pushing the county to send a daily work crew sourced from the county jail to clean up. Swimming in Lake Wylie on the park's beaches was banned mid-1973 after six drowning deaths in the 1972 and 1973 seasons.

In 1971, Duke Power asked the county to close the park as it wanted to use the land in its nascent Carowinds amusement park. As part of the deal Duke offered to move the park to a new location also owned by Duke and along Lake Wylie. Lake Wylie Park was officially closed at the end of the 1974 season. The county purchased the land for the replacement park from Duke in 1974, developed it into McDowell Park (the nucleus of today's McDowell Nature Preserve) and opened it to the public in 1976.
