= Buster Boyd Bridge =

Bridge between South and North Carolina

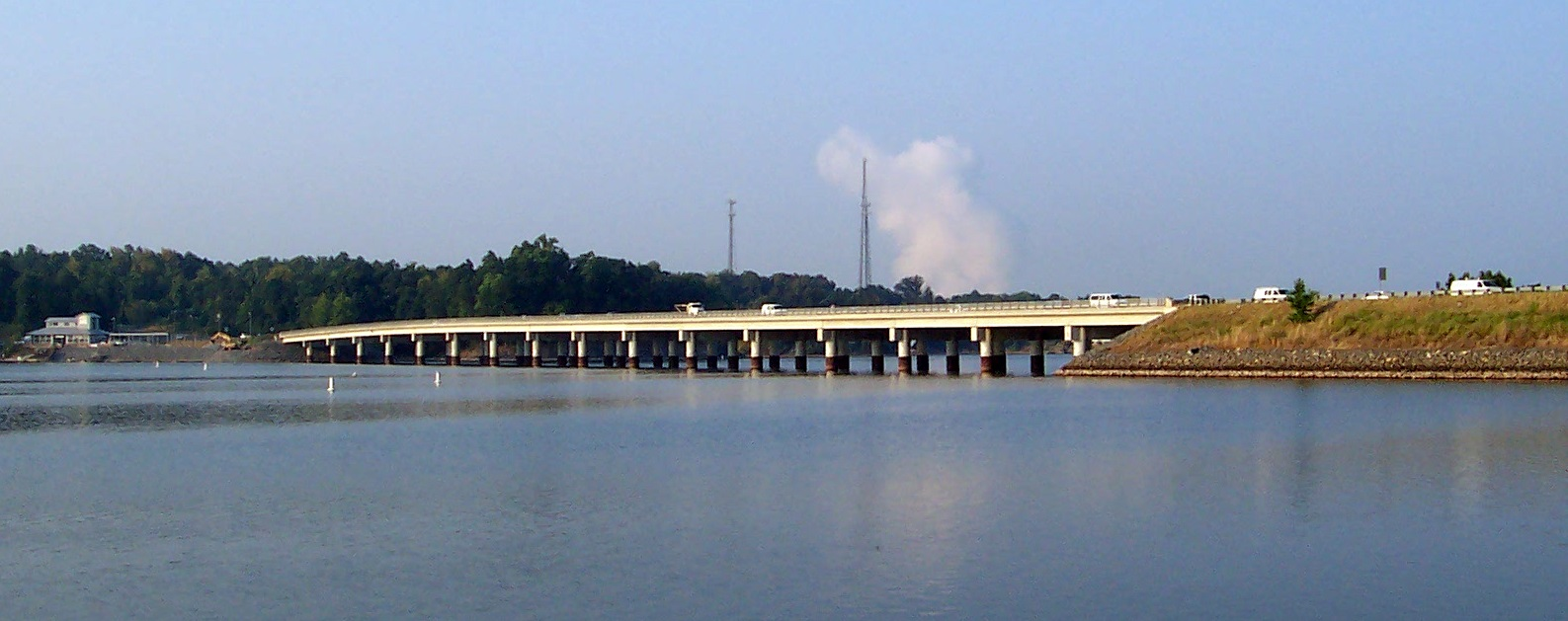
- Photo taken from shore of Lake Wylie, SC looking south towards Steele Creek, NC. Steam release from Catawba Nuclear Power Station seen in background.
- Coordinates: 35.10060°N 81.03997°W
- Carries: SC 49 (Charlotte Hwy); NC 49 (York Road)
- Crosses: Catawba River/Lake Wylie
- Locale: York County, SC and Mecklenburg County, NC
- Named for: William Boyd
- Maintained by: NCDOT and SCDOT

Characteristics
- Design: Segmented girder
- Material: Prestressed concrete
- Total length: 1,417.1 feet (431.9 m)
- Width: 67.6 feet (20.6 m)

History
- Opened: June 16, 2001 (third structure)

Statistics
- Daily traffic: 27,000 (as of 2010)

The Buster Boyd Bridge is a four-lane automobile bridge spanning the Catawba River/Lake Wylie between Lake Wylie, York County, South Carolina and Steele Creek, Mecklenburg County, North Carolina. The bridge carries/connects SC 49 and NC 49, which is utilized by mostly local traffic. A sidewalk, along the east facing side of the bridge, provides pedestrian access.

== History ==
=== Buster Boyd Bridge I ===
William Monroe "Buster" Boyd was an influential Mecklenburg County politician from Steele Creek. Boyd lobbied Mecklenburg County Commissioners for a hard-surfaced road to be built from Charlotte to what was then known as Lake Catawba. After the road was built, Boyd fought heavily for the construction of a bridge that would span Lake Catawba, connecting Mecklenburg County with York County on the South Carolina side. During its construction the bridge was referred to as York-Mecklenburg Bridge but upon completion was named in honor of Boyd, who donated the access land on the North Carolina side.

The original Buster Boyd Bridge was built at a cost of $120,000, with Mecklenburg County paying two-thirds of the cost and York County, South Carolina paying the remaining one-third. Mecklenburg County raised their portion of the funds by selling $75,000 in bonds The bridge spanned 1,378 feet across in 10 spans. It officially opened to automobile traffic on January 9, 1923. The bridge featured an excessively high lake clearance due to known plans by Catawba Power Company to build a larger dam, which would make Lake Catawba much larger and deeper in the following year.

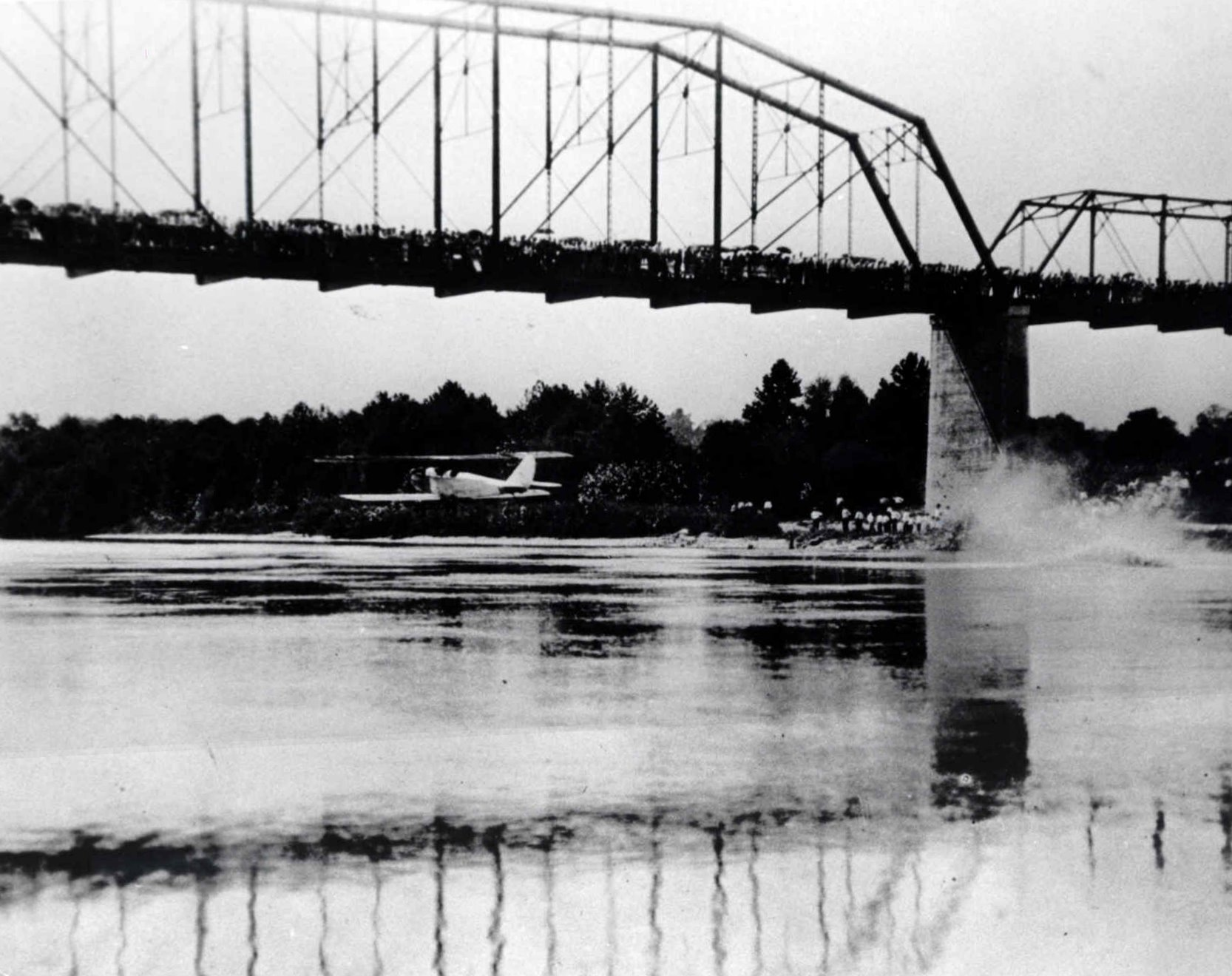
A biplane flies beneath the original Buster Boyd Bridge on August 17, 1923.

A great celebration of the new Buster Boyd Bridge was held on August 17, 1923. Both North Carolina Governor Cameron A. Morrison and South Carolina Governor Thomas Gordon McLeod were among the estimated crowd of 12,000 attending the event. Ceremonies commenced with several acrobatic biplanes flying aerial maneuvers beneath the center span of the bridge.

In 1960 the name of the body of water over which the Buster Boyd Bridge spans was changed from Lake Catawba to Lake Wylie in honor of Dr. Walker Gill Wylie, one of the founders of what was to become Duke Energy Company.

Just one month before a new bridge was to replace the original bridge, it was closed to traffic in September 1961 after a truck struck it, causing serious structural damage.

=== Buster Boyd Bridge II ===
The second Buster Boyd Bridge opened in October 1961 at a cost of $700,000. The structure was demolished in July 2001, two weeks after the third bridge first began carrying traffic.

=== Buster Boyd Bridge III ===
Construction on the third and current Buster Boyd Bridge began in April 1999, as a joint-partnership between the North Carolina Department of Transportation and the South Carolina Department of Transportation. The new bridge first opened to automobile traffic with only two lanes on June 16, 2001, with all four-lanes finally being officially completed on September 16, 2003 (two years behind schedule). The final cost of the bridge was over $12 million.

In addition to replacing the 40-year-old 2nd Buster Boyd Bridge and finally expanding automobile traffic to four lanes, the newest Buster Boyd Bridge also provides a lake clearance five feet higher than before to allow for more boat traffic beneath the center span. The current structure also provides a separated pedestrian walkway on each side for the first time.

== Trivia ==
The Buster Boyd Bridge is the only bridge in which North Carolina is on the southern end and South Carolina is on the northern end.
