= Bullock Creek =

Bullock Creek may refer to:

- Bullock Creek (New Zealand), a river valley in the Buller District of New Zealand
- Bullock Creek (Northern Territory), a fossil site in Australia
- Bullock Creek (South Carolina), a stream in York County
- Bullock Creek, South Carolina, an unincorporated community in York County
