= William Marshall Comer =

American politician

Member of the South Carolina House of Representatives
- In office 1965–1972

Personal details
- Born: November 15, 1918 York County, South Carolina, U.S.
- Died: January 15, 2006 (aged 87)
- Education: Wofford College

William Marshall Comer (November 15, 1918 – January 15, 2006) was an American politician. He served as a member of the South Carolina House of Representatives.

== Life and career ==
Comer was born in York County, South Carolina. He attended Union High School and Wofford College.

In 1965, Comer was elected to the South Carolina House of Representatives, representing Union County, South Carolina.

Comer died in January 2006, at the age of 87.
