= Nanny Mountain =

Mountain in South Carolina, United States

Highest point
- Elevation: 981 ft (299 m)
- Coordinates: 35.073752°N 81.103131°W

Geography
- Location: York County, South Carolina, U.S.
- Topo map: Nanny Mountain Topo Map

Nanny Mountain is a mountain summit in York County in the state of South Carolina (SC), United States. Nanny Mountain rises to an elevation of 981 feet (299 m) above sea level. The mountain is located near Lake Wylie and was privately owned, but is now open to the public from 8am to 6pm and the park is owned and operated by York County Parks.
