= Dori Sanders =

American novelist

- Born: Dorinda Sanders; 1934 (age 91–92); Filbert, South Carolina
- Occupation: Author
- Writing career
- Genres: Fiction, memoir
- Notable work: Clover (1990)

Dorinda "Dori" Sanders (born 1934, York County, South Carolina) is an African-American novelist, food writer and farmer. Her first novel, Clover (1990), was a bestseller, and won a 1990 Lillian Smith Book Award. She has also written a cookbook, Dori Sanders' Country Cooking, that mixes recipes and anecdotes.

The eighth of 10 children, Sanders is a fourth-generation farmer. She cultivates peaches and vegetables with her brother, on Sanders Peach Farm and Roadside Market, located in Filbert, South Carolina. In the video created to celebrate her 2011 Craig Claiborne Lifetime Achievement Award from the Southern Foodways Alliance, Sanders tells how her father, a rural school teacher, purchased the land in approximately 1915 and began successfully cultivating peaches in the early 1920s.

== Works ==
- Clover: A Novel, 1990
- Her Own Place: A Novel, 1993
- Dori Sanders' Country Cooking: recipes and stories from the family farm stand, 1995
- Promise Land: A Farmer Remembers, 2004
