= Baxter Village, South Carolina =

- Census-designated place
- Location within South Carolina Location within the United States
- Coordinates: 35°01′41″N 80°58′45″W
- Country: United States
- State: South Carolina
- County: York

Area
  - Total: 1.44 sq mi (3.73 km^{2})
  - Land: 1.42 sq mi (3.68 km^{2})
  - Water: 0.019 sq mi (0.05 km^{2})
- Elevation: 620 ft (190 m)

Population (2020)
  - Total: 4,217
  - Density: 2,966/sq mi (1,145.1/km^{2})
- Time zone: UTC-5 (Eastern (EST))
  - Summer (DST): UTC-4 (EDT)
- ZIP Code: 29708 (Fort Mill)
- Area codes: 803/839
- FIPS code: 45-04528
- GNIS feature ID: 2812992

Baxter Village is a planned community and census-designated place (CDP) in York County, South Carolina, United States. It was first listed as a CDP prior to the 2020 census which showed a population of 4,217.

The CDP is in northeastern York County. It is bordered to the east by the city of Fort Mill, to the west by Tega Cay, and to the south by unincorporated Riverview. South Carolina Highway 160 forms the northeast border of the CDP; the highway leads southeast into Fort Mill and northwest 4 miles (6 km) into the western outskirts of Charlotte, North Carolina. Interstate 77 runs along the east side of Baxter Village, with access via Exit 85 to SC 160. I-77 leads north 16 miles (26 km) to the center of Charlotte and south 76 miles (122 km) to Columbia.

== Demographics ==
Historical population
Census	Pop.	Note	%±
2020	4,217		—
U.S. Decennial Census; 2020

Baxter Village first appeared as a census designated place in the 2020 U.S. census.

=== 2020 census ===
As of the 2020 census, Baxter Village had a population of 4,217. The median age was 38.7 years. 34.0% of residents were under the age of 18 and 10.4% of residents were 65 years of age or older. For every 100 females there were 93.1 males, and for every 100 females age 18 and over there were 87.5 males age 18 and over.

100.0% of residents lived in urban areas, while 0.0% lived in rural areas.

There were 1,409 households in Baxter Village, of which 49.2% had children under the age of 18 living in them. Of all households, 71.9% were married-couple households, 8.2% were households with a male householder and no spouse or partner present, and 17.7% were households with a female householder and no spouse or partner present. About 15.0% of all households were made up of individuals and 6.8% had someone living alone who was 65 years of age or older.

There were 1,486 housing units, of which 5.2% were vacant. The homeowner vacancy rate was 1.1% and the rental vacancy rate was 23.8%.

Baxter Village CDP, South Carolina – Demographic Profile (NH = Non-Hispanic)
Race / Ethnicity	Pop 2020	% 2020
White alone (NH)	3,818	90.54%
Black or African American alone (NH)	43	1.02%
Native American or Alaska Native alone (NH)	6	0.14%
Asian alone (NH)	67	4.59%
Pacific Islander alone (NH)	0	0.00%
Some Other Race alone (NH)	4	0.09%
Mixed Race/Multi-Racial (NH)	147	3.49%
Hispanic or Latino (any race)	132	3.13%
Total	4,217	100.00%

Note: the US Census treats Hispanic/Latino as an ethnic category. This table excludes Latinos from the racial categories and assigns them to a separate category. Hispanics/Latinos can be of any race.
