= India Hook, South Carolina =

- CDP
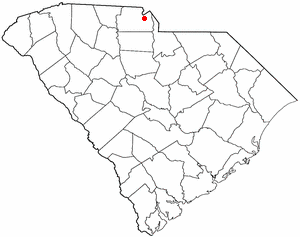
- Location of India Hook, South Carolina
- Coordinates: 35°00′28″N 81°02′09″W
- Country: United States
- State: South Carolina
- County: York

Area
  - Total: 3.54 sq mi (9.16 km^{2})
  - Land: 2.64 sq mi (6.83 km^{2})
  - Water: 0.90 sq mi (2.34 km^{2})
- Elevation: 584 ft (178 m)

Population (2020)
  - Total: 3,817
  - Density: 1,447.9/sq mi (559.03/km^{2})
- Time zone: UTC-5 (Eastern (EST))
  - Summer (DST): UTC-4 (EDT)
- ZIP code: 29732
- Area code: 803
- FIPS code: 45-35635
- GNIS feature ID: 2402610

India Hook is a census-designated place (CDP) in York County, South Carolina, United States. The majority of India Hook is annexed into the city of Rock Hill, but as of 2010 India Hook is still considered to be a CDP. It is one of the three communities located on Lake Wylie.

The population was 2,051 at the 2010 census.

== Geography ==
According to the United States Census Bureau, the CDP has a total area of 3.7 square miles (9.6 km^{2}), of which 2.8 square miles (7.3 km^{2}) is land and 0.9 square miles (2.3 km^{2}) (24.52%) is water.

== Demographics ==
Historical population
| Census | Pop. | Note | %± |
|---|---|---|---|
| 2020 | 3,817 | | — |
U.S. Decennial Census

=== 2020 census ===
As of the 2020 census, India Hook had a population of 3,817. The median age was 43.3 years. 20.6% of residents were under the age of 18 and 21.0% of residents were 65 years of age or older. For every 100 females there were 96.4 males, and for every 100 females age 18 and over there were 91.9 males age 18 and over.

98.1% of residents lived in urban areas, while 1.9% lived in rural areas.

There were 1,552 households in India Hook, of which 29.6% had children under the age of 18 living in them. Of all households, 55.8% were married-couple households, 15.6% were households with a male householder and no spouse or partner present, and 23.1% were households with a female householder and no spouse or partner present. About 25.5% of all households were made up of individuals and 10.5% had someone living alone who was 65 years of age or older.

There were 1,635 housing units, of which 5.1% were vacant. The homeowner vacancy rate was 1.1% and the rental vacancy rate was 4.9%.

India Hook racial composition
| Race | Num. | Perc. |
|---|---|---|
| White (non-Hispanic) | 2,982 | 78.12% |
| Black or African American (non-Hispanic) | 322 | 8.44% |
| Native American | 22 | 0.58% |
| Asian | 85 | 2.23% |
| Pacific Islander | 2 | 0.05% |
| Other/Mixed | 174 | 4.56% |
| Hispanic or Latino | 230 | 6.03% |

=== 2000 census ===
As of the census of 2000, there were 1,614 people, 641 households, and 496 families residing in the CDP. The population density was 582.0 inhabitants per square mile (224.7/km^{2}). There were 702 housing units at an average density of 253.2 per square mile (97.8/km^{2}). The racial makeup of the CDP was 96.59% White, 1.05% African American, 0.50% Native American, 0.81% Asian, and 1.05% from two or more races. Hispanic or Latino of any race were 0.25% of the population.

There were 641 households, out of which 32.8% had children under the age of 18 living with them, 65.7% were married couples living together, 8.3% had a female householder with no husband present, and 22.5% were non-families. 20.0% of all households were made up of individuals, and 4.2% had someone living alone who was 65 years of age or older. The average household size was 2.52 and the average family size was 2.88.

In the CDP, the population was spread out, with 23.0% under the age of 18, 5.9% from 18 to 24, 30.0% from 25 to 44, 29.1% from 45 to 64, and 11.8% who were 65 years of age or older. The median age was 40 years. For every 100 females, there were 95.6 males. For every 100 females age 18 and over, there were 98.7 males.

The median income for a household in the CDP was $54,266, and the median income for a family was $62,566. Males had a median income of $37,214 versus $24,646 for females. The per capita income for the CDP was $24,693. About 6.2% of families and 7.8% of the population were below the poverty line, including 10.6% of those under age 18 and 3.7% of those age 65 or over.

== See also ==
- Lesslie, South Carolina
- Riverview, South Carolina
