= McDowell Nature Preserve =

Park in Charlotte, North Carolina

- McDowell Park
- Interactive map of McDowell Nature Preserve
- Type: Nature reserve, Historic site
- Location: Steele Creek, North Carolina
- Coordinates: 35.0965°N 81.0236°W
- Area: Over 1,140 acres (460 ha)
- Opened: October 29, 1976
- Administrator: Mecklenburg County, North Carolina Parks and Recreation
- Open: Sunrise until sunset
- Camp sites: 56 camp sites, 13 RV sites
- Hiking trails: 13
- Terrain: forest
- Water: Lake Wylie
- Website: parkandrec.mecknc.gov/Places-to-Visit/Nature/mcdowell-nature-center-and-preserve

McDowell Nature Preserve, formerly known as McDowell Park, is a city park and nature preserve in southwestern Charlotte, North Carolina on the shores of Lake Wylie. The park features forested hiking trails, rental campsites, fishing, boat access and a nature center.

== History ==
Mecklenburg County opened Lake Wylie Park, its first county park, in 1967. Like McDowell Park it was located on Lake Wylie and offered swimming and boat access to the lake. However, Lake Wylie Park was developed on land leased to the county by Duke Power and in 1971 Duke asked to end the lease in order to develop part of the Carowinds amusement park on it. Duke donated the land that eventually became McDowell Park to the county to replace Lake Wylie Park.

McDowell Park opened on October 29, 1976 and was named after John McDowell, a former chairman of the Mecklenburg Recreation Commission and supporter of the county's efforts to develop parks along Lake Wylie. The new McDowell Park was developed with a $620,000 grant (equivalent to $4,047,571 in 2025) from the United States Department of the Interior matching state and local funds. When the park opened its swimming area was staffed by lifeguards, a response to several drownings at Lake Wylie Park in the early 70s that led to the closure of its swimming areas in 1973. However, by July of its first swimming season in 1978, the McDowell swimming areas were also closed to swimmers after a series of four drownings. The park's popularity and eventual crowding resulted in a proposed $1 entrance fee per car on weekends and summer holidays in 1980 (equivalent to $4 in 2025) but this was rejected by the county commission.

The park was expanded in 1980 with the purchase of an additional 800 acres (320 ha) for the Southwest Nature Preserve. The park's nature center opened in the nature preserve in 1985. Part of the park's nature preserve was permanently dedicated as a prairie habitat in 1994 as part of a deal where endangered Schweinitz's sunflower (Helianthus schweinitzii) plants were transplanted to the park from a widening of Providence Road in Matthews. Later, the prairie was named the Dodge City Piedmont Prairie Restoration Site after a nearby amusement park operated in the 1930s.

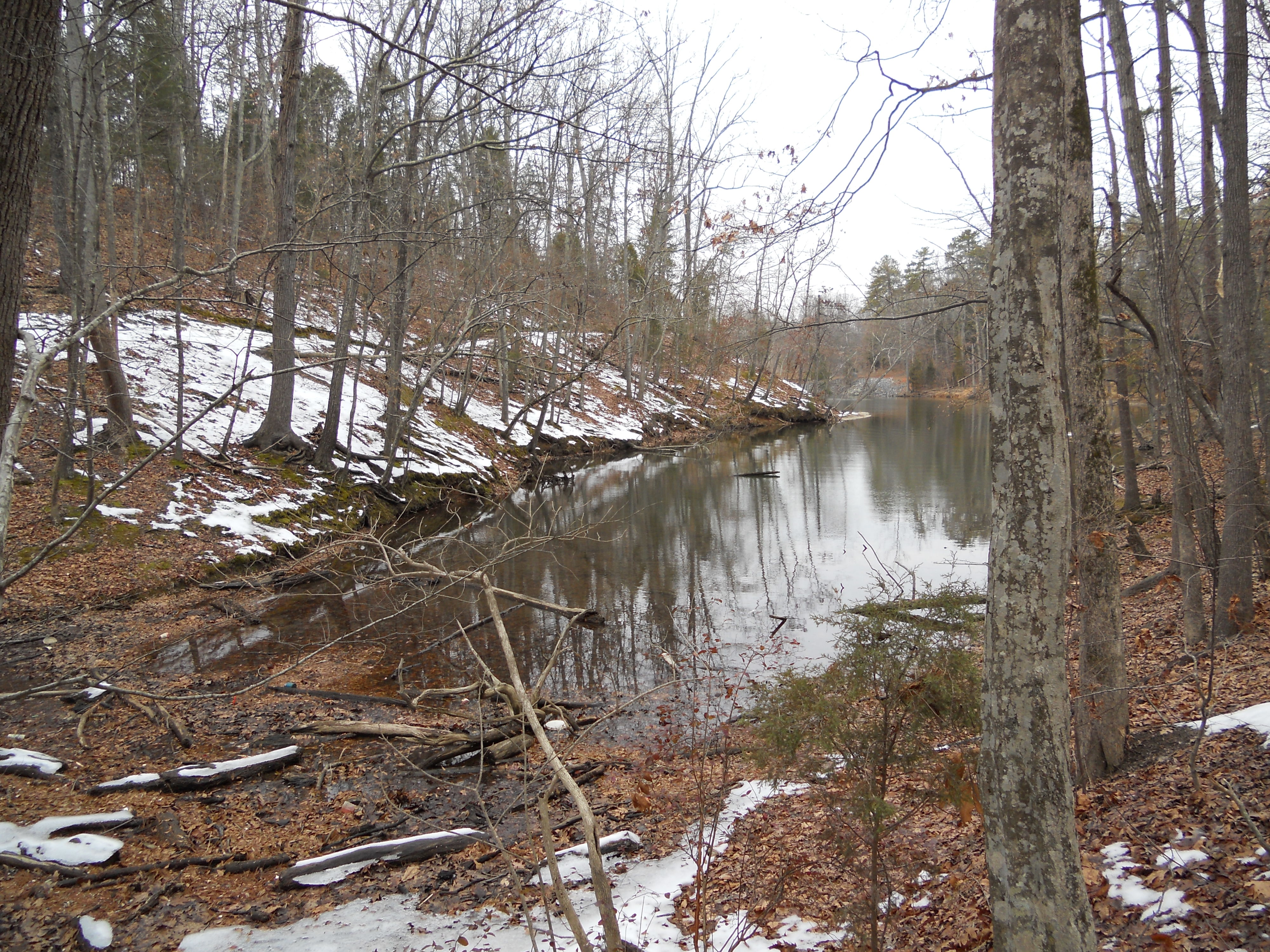
McDowell Park contains many Lake Wylie inlets

In 1989 Hurricane Hugo destroyed an estimated 5,000 trees and the park's playgrounds and campsites. The tree cleanup was only fully finished in 1991.

Crime came to McDowell Nature Preserve in the 2000s when a rapist working at an Exxon gas station in Charlotte carjacked a woman, drove her to the park and raped her in the forest. In 2003 gang members linked to MS-13 shot four men on Copperhead Island killing one of them.

McDowell Park was home to the national tryouts for the U.S. Women's National Kayak Polo team in 2013 and hosted the national championship games in 2010 and 2014.

== Copperhead Island ==
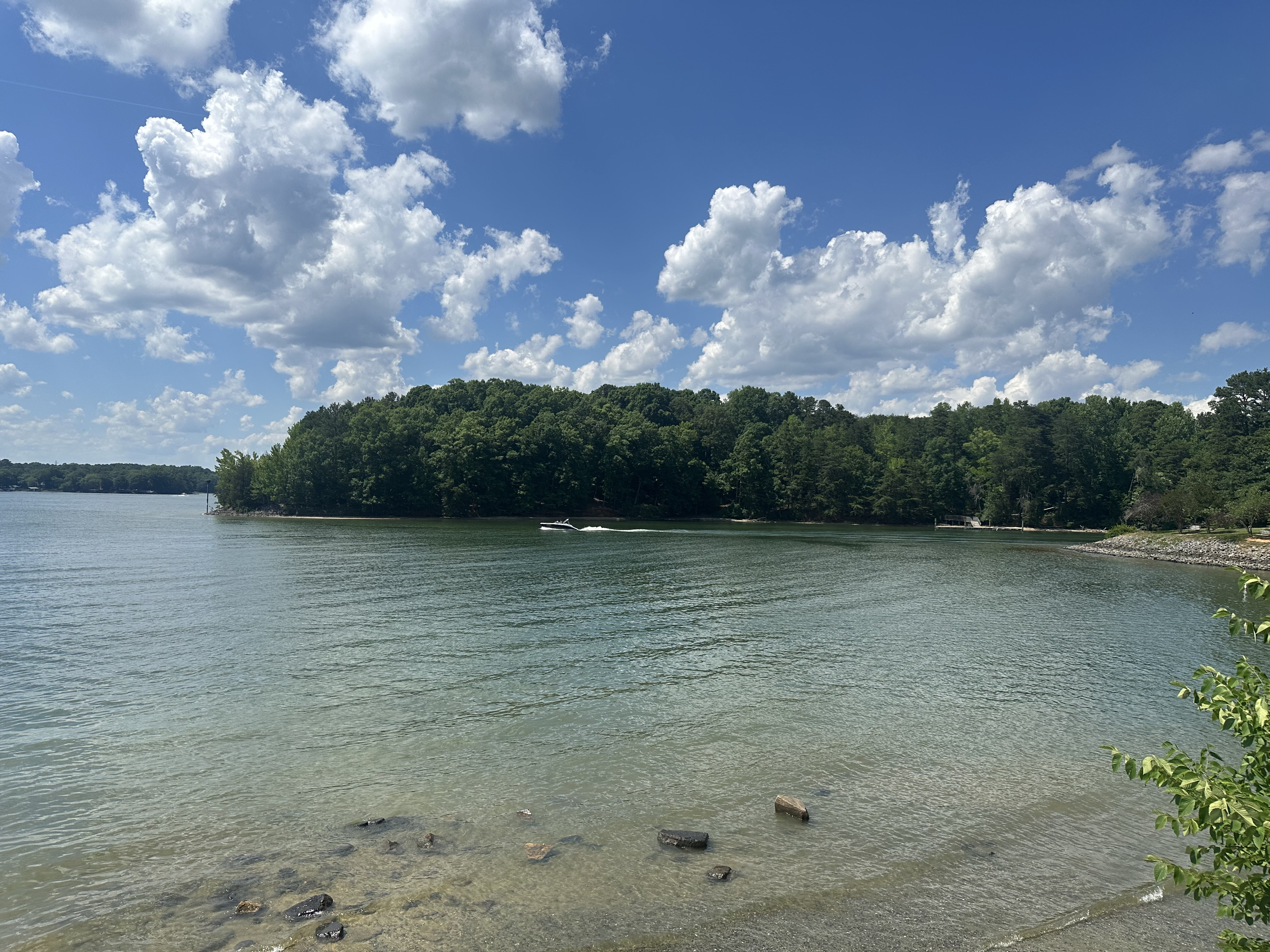
Copperhead Island from the McDowell fishing pier

Copperhead Island is a 12-acre (4.9 ha) island in Lake Wylie north of the McDowell Park waterfront deck. The island was originally owned by Duke Energy and kept undeveloped except for a nearby boat ramp built by Duke. Despite the name it does not have an unusual number of copperhead snakes. Mecklenburg County began developing and incorporating the island into McDowell Park in 1984 by clearing brush and building campsites, picnic shelters and a causeway connecting the mainland and the island. In 1990 the county proposed turning Copperhead Island into an upscale resort featuring cabins, a bridge or ski lift connecting the island to the rest of the park and a pontoon boat ferry around the lake. These plans were cancelled after local NIMBY opposition. County planners solicited proposals to rename the island in 1992 but did not make any changes.
