= G. G. Allen Steam Station =

Coal-fired electricity generating facility located in Gaston County, North Carolina

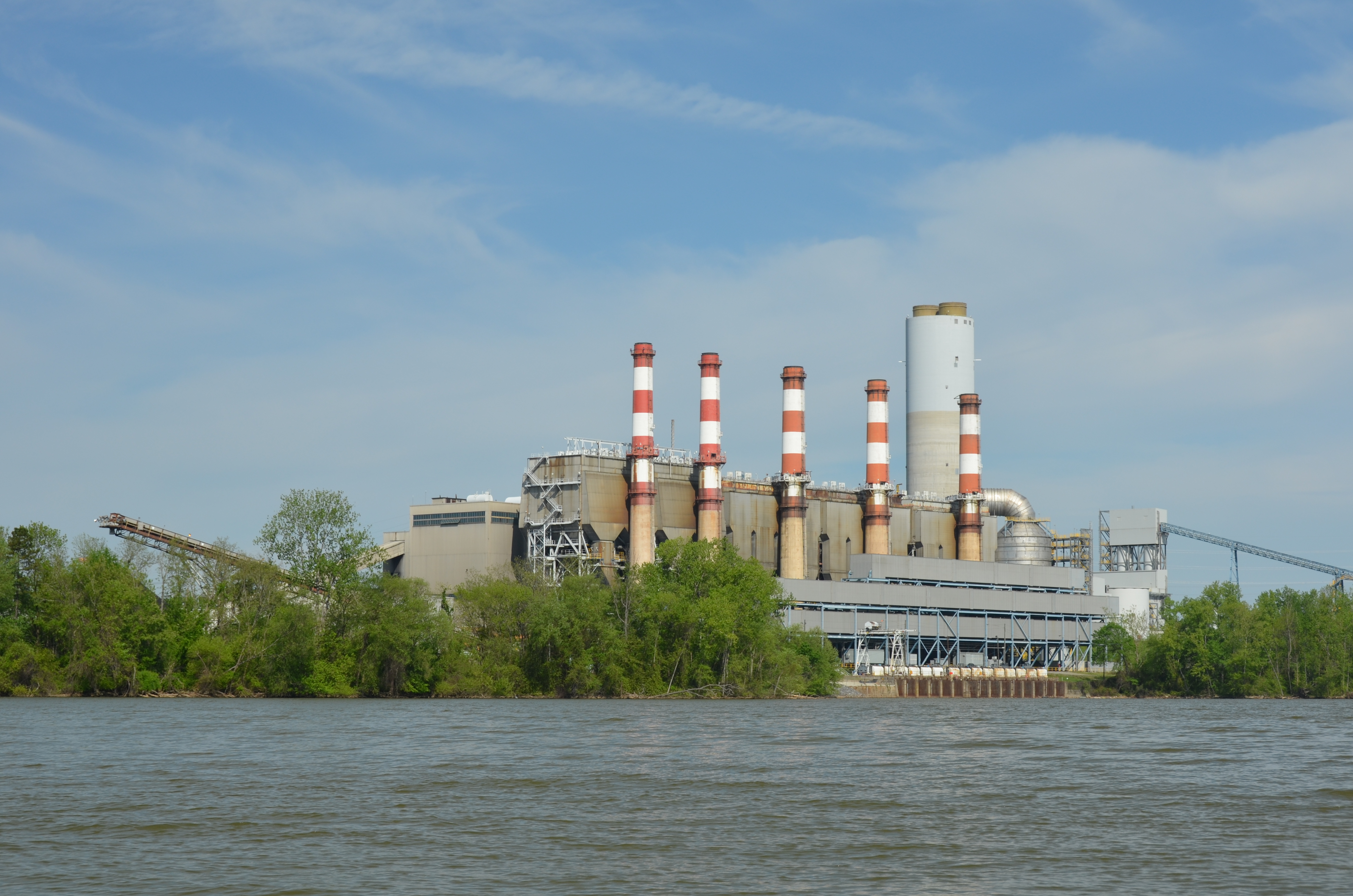
- Allen Steam Station in 2013
- Country: United States
- Location: South Point Township, Gaston County, North Carolina
- Coordinates: 35°11′25″N 81°0′30″W
- Status: Decommissioned
- Commission date: 1957-1961
- Decommission date: December 31, 2024
- Owner: Duke Energy

Thermal power station
- Primary fuel: Coal

Power generation
- Units operational: 2 × 165 MWe; 3 × 275 MWe
- Nameplate capacity: 1,148.4 MW; 435.2 MW

G. G. Allen Steam Station was a 1.140 GW coal-fired electricity generating facility, located in South Point Township, Gaston County, North Carolina, on man-made Lake Wylie (part of the Catawba River). Units 1 and 2 (165 MW each) began operating in 1957; units 3, 4, and 5 (275 MW each) in 1959, 1960, and 1961 respectively. Named for George Garland Allen, a former president and first chairman of the board for Duke Power, the Allen facility is the only Duke Energy station with five units under one roof. The plant is equipped with a flue-gas desulfurization system, completed in 2009, that decreases the air emissions coming from the plant. In February 2021, Duke Energy in a filing to the North Carolina Utilities Commission advanced their planned closure for Unit 3 from December 31, 2021 to March 31, 2021. Two additional units were retired in 2021, followed by another in September 2023, and the final in December of 2024.

== Environmental impact ==
G. G. Allen Steam Station has made significant improvements to reduce emissions from the company's coal-fired plants. Allen has been equipped with scrubbers to reduce the station's sulfur dioxide emissions by approximately 95 percent.Allen Steam Station was an active part of the clean smokestacks act.

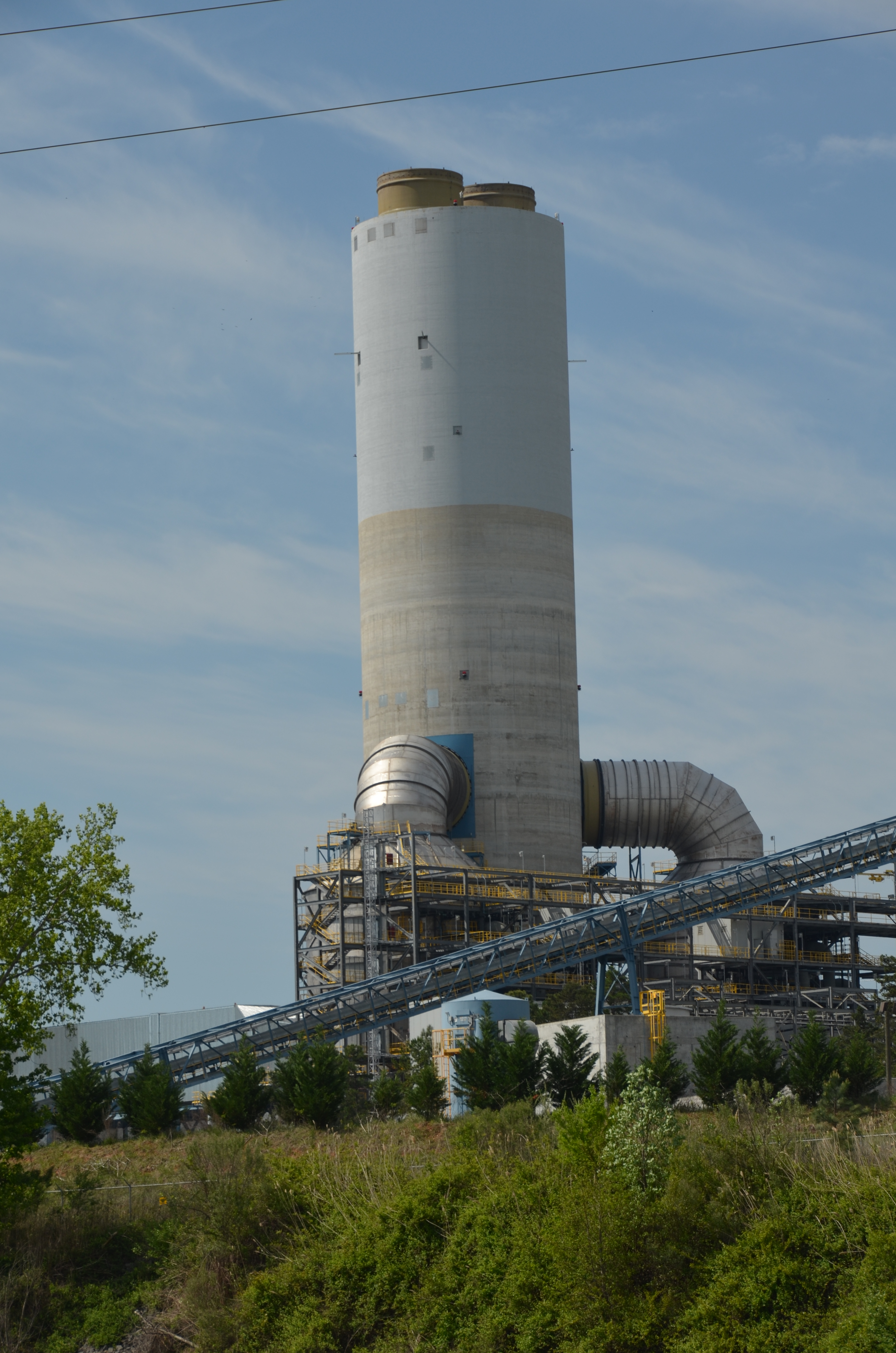
The G G Allen Steam Plant scrubber

=== 1995–2001 data ===
Nitrous Oxide, Sulfur Dioxide, and Carbon Dioxide emissions, in tons per year.
Year	NO_{x}	SO_{2}	CO_{2}
2001	10,673	37,027	5,487,331
2000	13,054	34,058	5,914,264
1999	12,087	32,169	5,619,742
1998	9,655	25,224	4,508,312
1997	14,090	40,083	6,627,324
1996	15,184	35,291	5,545,956
1995	10,976	21,274	3,661,778

Toxic release inventory from G. G. Allen Steam Station for 2000. All quantities are in pounds.
Pollutant	Air	Land	Water	Total on-site releases
Ammonia	1,605		1,500	3,105
Arsenic compounds	1,105	49,005	3,200	53,310
Barium compounds	4,305	480,005	8,400	492,710
Chromium compounds	995	84,005	600	85,600
Cobalt compounds	205	32,005	1,500	33,710
Copper compounds	605	87,005	2,200	89,810
Hydrochloric acid	5,300,005			5,300,005
Hydrogen fluoride	340,005			340,005
Lead compounds	795	34,005	120	34,920
Manganese compounds	1,205	100,005	4,200	105,410
Mercury compounds	200	110	3	313
Nickel compounds	735	55,005	300	56,040
Sulfuric acid	340,005			340,005
Vanadium compounds	1,005	99,005	750	100,760
Zinc compounds	1,005	60,005	750	61,760
TOTAL	5,993,780	1,080,160	23,523	7,097,463

== See also ==
- List of power stations
- Global warming
