= Smith, South Carolina =

Unincorporated community in South Carolina, US

Coordinates: 34°49′17″N 81°06′55″W

Smith or Smiths Turnout is an unincorporated community in southern York County, South Carolina located south of Rock Hill and northwest of Edgemoor near the Chester County line. The elevation of Smith is 531 feet.

== Sources ==
- U.S. Geological Survey - Geological Names Information System
