= Bethel, South Carolina =

Former settlement in South Carolina, United States

Coordinates: 34.11713°N 82.38235°W

Bethel is a town in York County, in the U.S. state of South Carolina.

== History ==
The community took its name in the 18th century from the local Bethel Presbyterian church.
