= Ogden, South Carolina =

Unincorporated community in South Carolina, US

Coordinates: 34°51′11″N 80°54′40″W

Ogden is an unincorporated community in York County, South Carolina, United States, located along South Carolina Highway 324, southwest of Rock Hill. The elevation of Ogden is 532 feet.
