= Lake Wylie, South Carolina =

- CDP
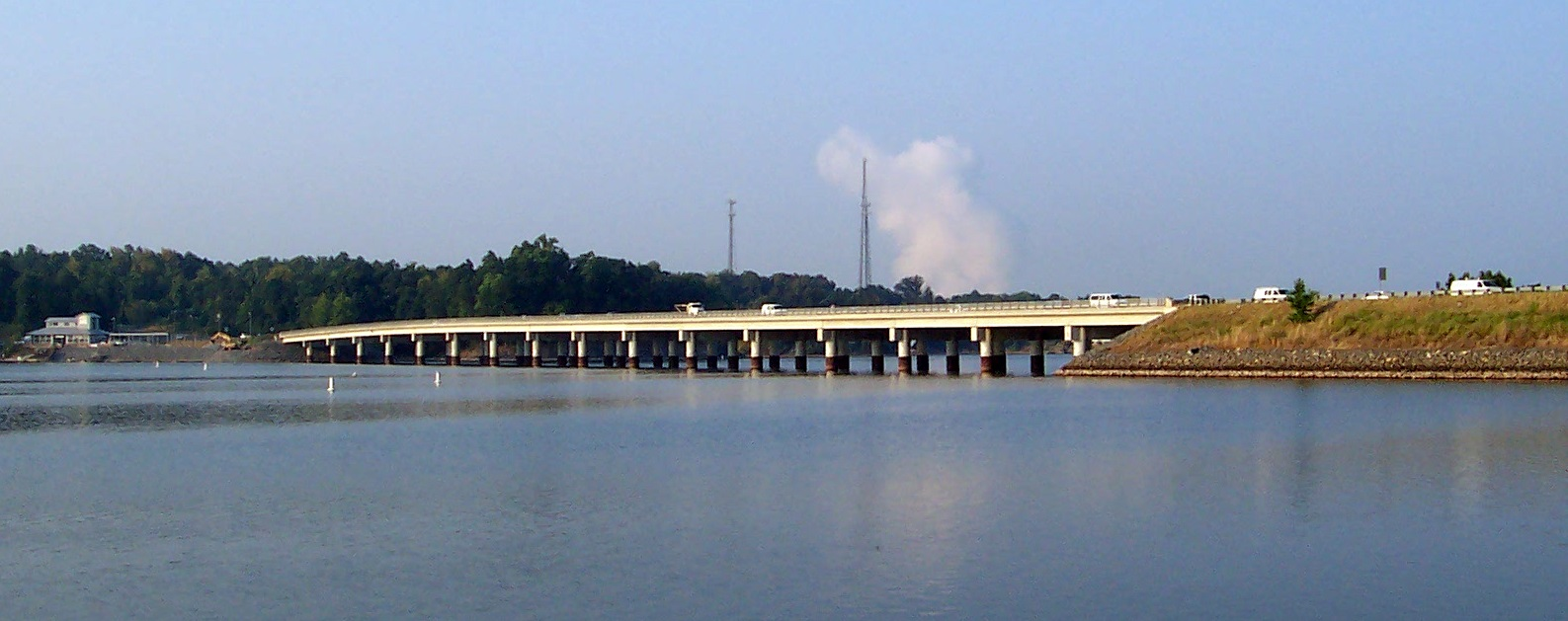
- Buster Boyd Bridge coming into Lake Wylie.
- Motto(s): Where geography, people, and economic vitality have fashioned Southern lifestyle.
- Interactive map of Lake Wylie, South Carolina
- Coordinates: 35°06′42″N 81°03′45″W
- Country: United States
- State: South Carolina
- County: York

Area
  - Total: 10.64 sq mi (27.57 km^{2})
  - Land: 7.89 sq mi (20.43 km^{2})
  - Water: 2.76 sq mi (7.14 km^{2})
- Elevation: 564 ft (172 m)

Population (2020)
  - Total: 13,655
  - Density: 1,731.0/sq mi (668.34/km^{2})
- Time zone: UTC-5 (Eastern (EST))
  - Summer (DST): UTC-4 (EDT)
- ZIP code: 29710 (Clover)
- Area codes: 803, 839
- FIPS code: 45-39785
- GNIS feature ID: 2403208

Lake Wylie is a census-designated place (CDP) in York County, South Carolina, United States. The population was 8,841 at the 2010 census. Lake Wylie is located on a peninsula along the shore of Lake Wylie, a reservoir that was named for Dr. W. Gil Wylie in 1960. It is a suburb of Charlotte, North Carolina.

== Geography ==
Lake Wylie is located on a peninsula along the shore of Lake Wylie in the Piedmont of both North and South Carolina. According to the United States Census Bureau, the CDP has a total area of 4.7 square miles (12 km^{2}), of which 3.5 square miles (9.1 km^{2}) is land and 1.3 square miles (3.4 km^{2}) (26.58%) is water.

As a result of the community's proximity to the state line between North and South Carolina, it has been significantly affected by recent efforts to resurvey the state line using modern global positioning system technology. The process moved the state line approximately 150 feet (46 m) southward in the Lake Wylie area, resulting in several properties in the community now being located in South Point Township in North Carolina — including one property where the new state line falls between the owner's house and his back deck, and a gas station and convenience store whose owner has noted that differences in gas prices and retail regulations between the two states will probably force him out of business.

== Climate ==
Lake Wylie has a humid subtropical climate, characterized by humid summers and cool dry winters. Precipitation does not vary greatly by amount between seasons with snow, rain, and sleet in the winter months and mostly rain in the summer months with occasional hail from strong thunderstorms. July is the hottest month, with an average high temperature of below 90 °F (32 °C) and an average low temperature of around 70 °F (21 °C). The coldest month of the year is January, when the average high temperature is below 50 °F (10 °C) and the average low temperature is below 30 °F (−1 °C).

== Demographics ==
Historical population
Census	Pop.	Note	%±
2020	13,655		—
U.S. Decennial Census

=== 2020 census ===
As of the 2020 census, Lake Wylie had a population of 13,655. The median age was 41.3 years. 24.2% of residents were under the age of 18 and 16.5% of residents were 65 years of age or older. For every 100 females there were 93.9 males, and for every 100 females age 18 and over there were 91.3 males age 18 and over.

99.9% of residents lived in urban areas, while 0.1% lived in rural areas.

There were 5,347 households in Lake Wylie, of which 33.9% had children under the age of 18 living in them. Of all households, 60.0% were married-couple households, 13.0% were households with a male householder and no spouse or partner present, and 22.5% were households with a female householder and no spouse or partner present. About 21.7% of all households were made up of individuals and 8.3% had someone living alone who was 65 years of age or older.

There were 5,734 housing units, of which 6.7% were vacant. The homeowner vacancy rate was 1.9% and the rental vacancy rate was 9.5%.

Lake Wylie racial composition
Race	Num.	Perc.
White (non-Hispanic)	10,513	76.99%
Black or African American (non-Hispanic)	1,288	9.43%
Native American	38	0.28%
Asian	219	1.6%
Pacific Islander	6	0.04%
Other/Mixed	739	5.41%
Hispanic or Latino	852	6.24%

=== 2010 census ===
At the 2010 census, there were 8,841 people, 1,458 households and 1,039 families residing in the CDP. The population density was 880.6 per square mile (340.0/km^{2}). There were 1,610 housing units at an average density of 463.1 per square mile (178.8/km^{2}). The racial make-up was 97.68% White, 1.05% African American, 0.26% Native American, 0.75% Asian, 0.07% from other races and 0.02% from two or more races. Hispanic or Latino of any race were 0.82% of the population.

There were 1,458 households, of which 16.5% had children under the age of 18 living with them, 66.3% were married couples living together, 3.8% had a female with no husband present, and 28.7% were non-families. 24.5% of all households were made up of individuals, and 8.2% had someone living alone who was 65 years of age or older. The average household size was 2.10 and the average family size was 2.47.

13.5% of the population were under the age of 18, 4.4% from 18 to 24, 21.9% from 25 to 44, 36.9% from 45 to 64, and 23.4% who were 65 years of age or older. The median age was 51 years. For every 100 females, there were 98.0 males. For every 100 females age 18 and over, there were 96.8 males.

The median household income was $76,819 and the median family income was $88,208. Males had a median income of $50,208 and females $32,679. The per capita income was $43,567. None of the families and 0.8% of the population were living below the poverty line, including no under eighteens and none of those over 64.

Lake Wylie's population grew to around 12,000 during the 2010s as younger families were drawn there from all over the U.S. by low tax rates and the local schools. As a result, local infrastructure such as the roads and the water supply system were stressed by the demand, with traffic congestion regularly occurring on local roads and frequent boil-water advisories. York County has declared a moratorium on all new construction in order to better plan the area's development.

== Education ==
Lake Wylie has a public library, a branch of the York County Library.

The CDP is part of York County School District 2 (Clover School District).

== See also ==
- Buster Boyd Bridge
- Tega Cay
