= Catawba Nuclear Station =

Nuclear power plant in South Carolina, US

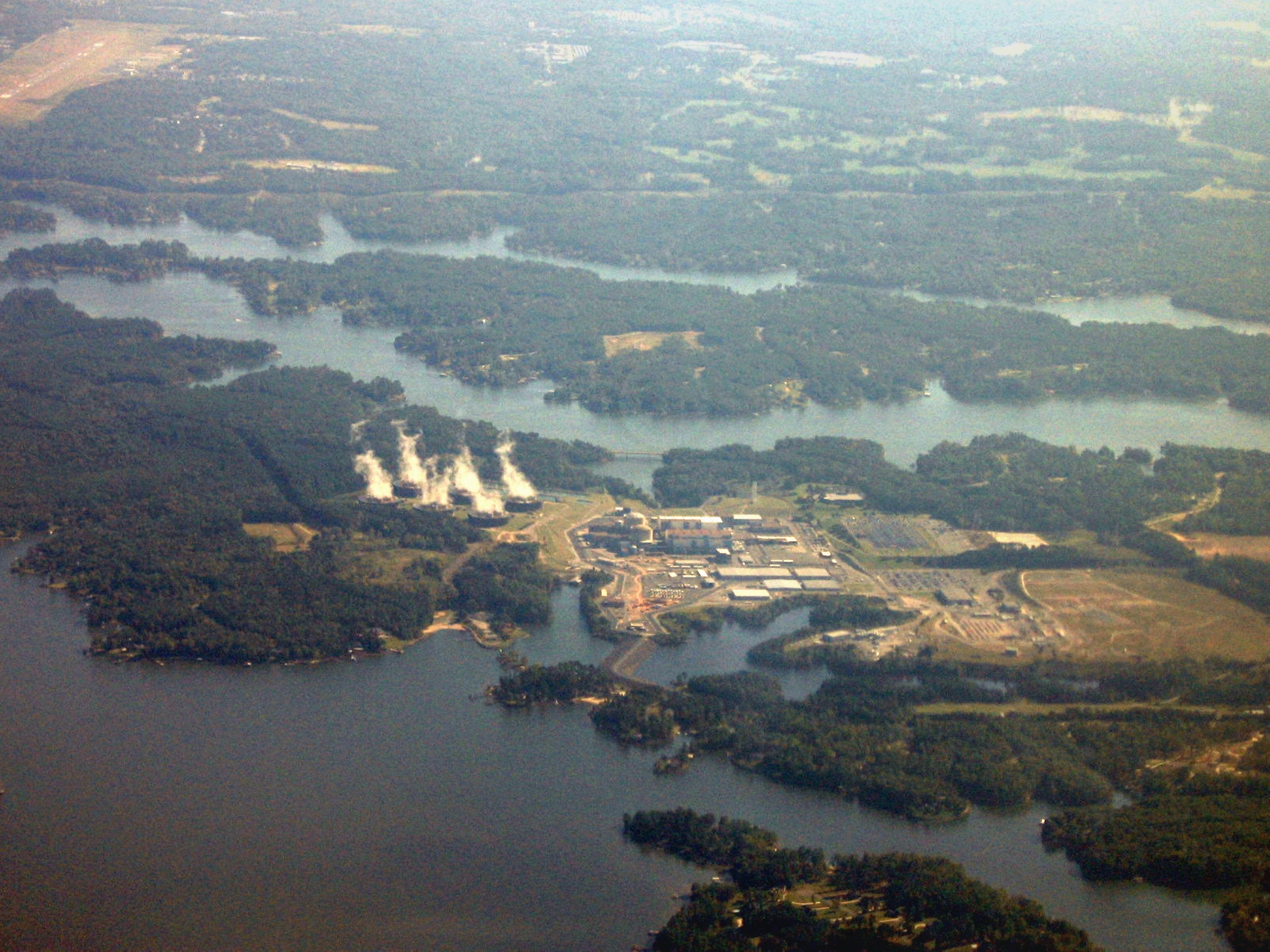
- Country: United States
- Location: York, York County, South Carolina
- Coordinates: 35°3.1′N 81°4.2′W
- Status: Operational
- Construction began: May 1, 1974
- Commission date: Unit 1: June 29, 1985; Unit 2: August 19, 1986
- Construction cost: $6.594 billion USD (2007)
- Operator: Duke Energy

Nuclear power station
- Reactor type: PWR
- Reactor supplier: Westinghouse
- Cooling towers: 6 × Mechanical draft
- Cooling source: Catawba River
- Thermal capacity: Unit 1: 3469 MW_{th} Unit 2: 3411 MW_{th}

Power generation
- Units operational: 2 × 1155 MW
- Make and model: WH 4-loop (ICECND)
- Nameplate capacity: 2310 MW
- Capacity factor: 97.98% (2017); 86.35% (lifetime)
- Annual net output: 18,585 GWh (2021)

External links
- Website: www.duke-energy.com/safety-and-preparedness/nuclear-safety/catawba
- Commons: Related media on Commons

The Catawba Nuclear Station is a nuclear power plant located on a 391-acre (158 ha) peninsula, called "Concord Peninsula", that reaches out into Lake Wylie, in York, South Carolina, US. Catawba utilizes a pair of Westinghouse four-loop pressurized water reactors.

As a part of the Megatons to Megawatts Program Catawba was one of the plants that received and tested 4 fuel assemblies containing MOX fuel with the plutonium supplied from old weapons programs. Because concerns of nuclear proliferation are greater with fuel containing plutonium, special precautions and added security were used around the new fuel. The four test assemblies did not perform as expected and at present those plans are shelved.

== History ==
In 2005, Catawba Nuclear Station's Unit 1 was selected to test four fuel assemblies containing mixed oxide (MOX) fuel, incorporating 140 kg of plutonium supplied from recycled nuclear weapons material. The MOX fuel pellets were supplied by the Cadarache reprocessing facility, and placed into fuel assemblies at the Melox facility, both in France. This test was part of the "Megatons to Megawatts" program, which was part of the Plutonium Management and Disposition Agreement between the United States and Russia.

== Plant design ==
The Catawba Nuclear Station uses ice condensers as part of its emergency containment systems. A nuclear plant ice condenser is a passive, static heat sink that relies on large quantities of ice to mitigate severe accidents. Ice condensers are designed to limit pressure in the event of an accidental steam release. This design allows smaller containment structures and reduced material requirements.

== Ownership ==
- Unit 1:
  - Operator: Duke Power
  - Owners: Duke Energy Carolinas, LLC 38.5%; North Carolina Electric Member Corporation 61.5%
- Unit 2:
  - Operator: Duke Power
  - Owners: 25% Piedmont Municipal Power Agency (PMPA).; NC Municipal Power Agency 64.9%, Central Electric Power Cooperative 13.1%

== Electricity production ==
Generation (MWh) of Catawba Nuclear Station
Year	Jan	Feb	Mar	Apr	May	Jun	Jul	Aug	Sep	Oct	Nov	Dec	Annual (Total)
2001	1,671,335	1,462,179	1,737,585	1,672,110	1,721,716	1,654,284	1,709,720	1,702,385	1,170,383	1,068,325	1,670,098	1,310,995	18,551,115
2002	1,740,710	1,571,618	1,734,597	1,532,925	1,212,857	1,659,167	1,708,874	1,710,585	1,660,580	1,729,505	1,650,216	1,742,277	19,653,911
2003	1,743,858	1,512,361	912,609	1,671,090	1,721,709	1,650,118	1,697,853	1,600,603	1,406,979	1,729,959	1,003,519	845,427	17,496,085
2004	1,702,735	1,418,812	1,690,239	1,673,869	1,682,122	1,653,108	1,705,420	1,678,886	1,096,441	958,323	1,598,492	1,688,362	18,546,809
2005	1,658,617	1,570,439	1,736,885	1,671,870	980,240	1,465,393	1,702,543	1,700,258	1,653,652	1,726,471	1,675,805	1,734,266	19,276,439
2006	1,736,915	1,571,168	1,332,939	937,368	1,191,552	1,364,006	1,706,519	1,706,801	1,659,937	1,733,099	1,113,628	840,246	16,894,178
2007	1,697,813	1,572,426	1,690,933	1,677,856	1,724,757	1,637,435	1,710,571	1,702,658	1,206,734	856,104	1,201,448	1,739,568	18,418,303
2008	1,742,948	1,627,530	1,733,084	1,675,673	909,504	1,054,683	1,710,824	1,710,635	1,661,102	1,732,359	1,685,682	1,732,428	18,976,452
2009	1,742,656	1,567,048	1,017,887	1,128,962	1,719,732	1,655,153	1,709,855	1,705,063	1,658,645	1,720,029	986,820	1,300,413	17,912,263
2010	1,741,469	1,399,749	1,728,681	1,673,175	1,713,619	1,627,291	1,700,712	1,684,985	1,255,669	1,086,800	1,612,856	1,739,073	18,964,079
2011	1,743,066	1,571,220	1,734,331	1,443,238	852,062	1,420,227	1,702,547	1,705,816	1,661,207	1,691,559	1,661,395	1,591,908	18,778,576
2012	1,740,898	1,626,096	1,100,980	781,818	1,720,056	1,663,117	1,703,209	1,703,930	1,660,642	1,728,086	1,481,566	918,901	17,829,299
2013	1,737,441	1,573,282	1,739,066	1,675,622	1,685,666	1,640,751	1,692,965	1,707,313	1,168,059	1,129,551	1,681,536	1,734,713	19,165,965
2014	1,740,115	1,565,583	1,733,807	1,669,146	991,827	873,188	1,641,203	1,704,720	1,654,441	1,721,033	1,680,861	1,735,585	18,711,509
2015	1,736,047	1,540,119	854,017	1,518,922	1,718,829	1,650,967	1,700,041	1,686,178	1,652,902	1,722,098	1,388,895	1,208,446	18,377,461
2016	1,738,844	1,626,326	1,730,136	1,674,615	1,726,508	1,636,484	1,713,351	1,712,102	1,069,035	1,480,081	1,695,728	1,755,054	19,558,264
2017	1,751,829	1,581,891	1,748,544	1,589,689	1,064,050	1,670,040	1,719,206	1,720,779	1,673,269	1,738,195	1,695,885	1,753,306	19,706,683
2018	1,755,287	1,573,055	1,281,077	1,277,492	1,722,303	1,666,757	1,718,028	1,717,259	1,660,307	1,727,977	1,259,451	1,420,722	18,779,715
2019	1,751,198	1,579,420	1,745,956	1,680,423	1,724,880	1,660,481	1,706,108	1,695,654	1,144,585	1,469,475	1,690,270	1,745,157	19,593,607
2020	1,744,732	1,518,522	1,733,869	1,658,878	877,325	1,631,148	1,712,914	1,712,250	1,634,101	1,694,678	1,687,296	1,750,957	19,356,670
2021	1,749,100	1,581,646	1,568,877	843,909	1,626,812	1,666,500	1,702,905	1,588,410	1,669,459	1,250,788	1,587,100	1,750,213	18,585,719
2022	1,758,770	1,584,685	1,747,782	1,530,365	1,734,366	1,669,441	1,709,519	1,715,818	1,074,230	987,987	1,694,026	1,755,875	19,487,864
2023	1,750,750	1,578,639	1,729,196	1,270,598	919,176	1,675,070	1,713,948	1,703,223	1,643,545	1,737,263	1,694,563	1,749,551	19,865,522
2024	1,753,481	1,637,871	1,285,300	1,274,416	1,730,960	1,665,140	1,710,388	1,712,874	1,474,984	805,390	1,690,680	1,724,109	18,465,593
2025	1,663,159	1,585,101	1,748,814	1,688,516	1,737,805	1,665,786	1,711,212	1,713,245	889,806	1,563,683	1,689,389	1,757,840	19,414,356
2026	1,760,854	1,590,044	1,708,684	867,583	1,338,336	1,679,603	1,726,953	1,727,507					--

== Surrounding population ==
The Nuclear Regulatory Commission (NRC) defines two emergency planning zones around nuclear power plants: a plume exposure pathway zone with a radius of 10 miles (16 km), concerned primarily with exposure to, and inhalation of, airborne radioactive contamination, and an ingestion pathway zone of about 50 miles (80 km), concerned primarily with ingestion of food and liquid contaminated by radioactivity.

The 2010 population within 10 miles (16 km) of Catawba was 213,407, an increase of 53.3 percent in a decade, according to an analysis of the 2010 United States census. The 2010 population within 50 miles (80 km) was 2,559,394, an increase of 25.0 percent since 2000. Cities within 50 miles include Charlotte, North Carolina (35 miles to city center).

== Seismic risk ==
In 2010, the NRC estimated the risk each year of an earthquake intense enough to cause core damage to the reactor at Catawba was 1 in 27,027.

== Incidents ==
=== 15 May 2013 ===
More than 100 gallons of water contaminated with radioactive tritium was released. However, the levels of tritium were less than one half the EPA limit for tritium and the leak was contained before it reached ground water.

=== 18 July 2017 ===
After a 1-month standard inspection, the Nuclear Regulatory Commission (NRC) found that Catawba Nuclear Station staff had failed to take preventive maintenance measures after an electrical component in one of the emergency diesel generators had failed a routine inspection test. As a result, the NRC increased oversight of the plant until the issue was corrected. This incident was concluded to be of low to moderate safety significance.

== See also ==
- Duke Energy
- Largest nuclear power plants in the United States
