= Bullock Creek, South Carolina =

Unincorporated community in South Carolina, US

Coordinates: 34°51′15″N 81°24′42″W

Bullock Creek is an unincorporated community in York County, in the U.S. state of South Carolina. It is located southwest of York and northeast of Union along the Broad River.

== History ==
A post office called Bullock Creek operated between 1832 and 1930. The community took its name from nearby Bullock Creek.
