= Balloon, South Carolina =

Coordinates: 35.122°N 81.105°W

Balloon is an historic community located in York County, South Carolina, United States. It was founded in 1889 and abandoned in 1903.

== See also ==
- Former populated places in York County, South Carolina

== Sources ==
- 1998/South Carolina POs/Meher/pg 3
- Balloon, South Carolina. Geographic Names Information System, U.S. Geological Survey.
