= Filbert, South Carolina =

Unincorporated community in South Carolina, US

Coordinates: 35°02′55″N 81°15′15″W

Filbert is an unincorporated community in York County, South Carolina, United States, which was formerly incorporated. Filbert was disincorporated and annexed, mostly between York and Clover. Road signs still exist to proclaim this rural village. Filbert's only major roadway is U.S. Highway 321.

== Notable people ==
Filbert is the hometown of author Dori Sanders, whose family there has operated one of the oldest African American owned farms in the region, primarily consisting of peach orchards, since 1915.
