= Henry's Knob =

Mountain in South Carolina, United States

Highest point
- Elevation: 1,129 ft (344 m)
- Coordinates: 35°07′51″N 81°16′27″W

Geography
- Location: York County, South Carolina, U.S.
- Topo map(s): USGS King's Mountain, NC

Henry's Knob is a mountain and Superfund Alternative Site in York County South Carolina at 1,120 ft (340 m) above sea level. It is near the North Carolina border and the town of Clover, South Carolina. The mountain was the site of an open-pit kyanite mine, which was under operation from 1947 to 1970. At the time of its discovery, the deposit of kyanite on the mountain was the world's largest United States Environmental Protection Agency (EPA) testing has determined that approximately 450 residences in the vicinity relying on well water are affected by groundwater contamination from the former mine. The mountain was stripped of approximately 100 feet (30 m) due to the mining operations. Today, the site is overgrown, with many pits and waste ponds still evident. While some efforts have been made to repopulate the site with vegetation, little cleanup of the dangerous minerals (including Manganese) has been done.

== History ==
Henry's Knob name derives from the Henry family, early settlers of York County who originally owned the mountain and surrounding land. In 1765 William Henry was granted 336 acres (1.36 km^{2}) on the south side of the Little Mountain, as Henry's Knob was then called, and four years later he was granted another 100 acres (0.40 km^{2}). At this time northern York County was still part of Mecklenburg County, North Carolina, and was not ceded to South Carolina until 1772.

In the 19th century the portion of the original Henry estate including the mountain was inherited by a female Henry descendant and was eventually sold out of the family prior to the Civil War.

A company named Commercial Ores mined the Henry's Knob site during the 1950s and 60s. Combustion Engineering acquired Commercial Ores in 1965 and then sold it in 1971. The mountain has been transferred between several property owners since then. ABB acquired Combustion Engineering in 1990, long after mining ceased.

The EPA identified ABB as the "successor of interest" and a potentially responsible party. The agency asked ABB to conduct an investigation of the Henry's Knob site and surrounding area to identify pollution, including the nature and extent of acid mine drainage that has entered the environment as a result of previous mining activities. The investigation work plan is on file at the Clover Public Library, along with other documents pertaining to the site.
