= Blairville, Michigan =

Farming community in Chippewa County, Michigan

Coordinates: 46°19′N 84°49′W

Blairville, Michigan is a farming community in Chippewa County, Michigan. It was founded in 1880 by William H. Wise and named for his father-in-law, who settled there the following year. The founders were Irish-Canadian immigrants.

== Sources ==
- Romig, Walter (1986). Michigan Place Names. Detroit: Wayne State University Press. p. 65. ISBN 978-0-8143-1838-6 – via Google Books.
