= Rock Hill/York County Airport =

Coordinates: 34°59′16″N 081°03′26″W

Rock Hill/York County Airport Rock Hill/York County Airport
- IATA: RKH; ICAO: KUZA; FAA LID: UZA

Summary
- Airport type: Public
- Owner/Operator: City of Rock Hill
- Serves: Rock Hill, South Carolina
- Location: 550 Airport Rd, Rock Hill, SC 29732
- Elevation AMSL: 666 ft / 203 m
- Website: Rock Hill/York County Airport
- Interactive map of Rock Hill/York County Airport

Runways
Direction	Length		Surface
Direction	ft	m	Surface
2/20	5,500	1,676	Asphalt

Statistics (2021)
- Aircraft operations: 28,100
- Based aircraft: 146
- Sources: FAA and airport website

Rock Hill/York County Airport (IATA: RKH, ICAO: KUZA, FAA LID: UZA) is a general aviation and reliever airport of Charlotte-Douglas International Airport located 5 miles (7 km) from the central business district of Rock Hill, in York County, South Carolina, United States. It is owned and operated by the City of Rock Hill, but York County is also represented on the Airport Commission.

The airport was originally referred to as Bryant Field, after South Carolina Aviation Hall of Fame inductee Robert E. Bryant, but the name has since been dropped to avoid confusion with Bryant Field in California.

Although most U.S. airports use the same three-letter location identifier for the FAA and IATA, Rock Hill/York County Airport is assigned UZA by the FAA and RKH by the IATA.

== History and expansion ==
Rock Hill/York County Airport first opened in 1959 on a 364 acres (1.47 km^{2}) tract of land purchased by the Rock Hill City Council. In 1960 an airport commission was formed with six local members interested in the advancement of the airport’s facilities.

Over the years, the Rock Hill/York County Airport team has pushed for recognition of the airport as a key general aviation gateway to the Carolinas. In 1991, the runway was extended to its current length of 5,500 feet, allowing support for virtually all piston and turboprop aircraft in addition to most short-to-medium range business jets. A 7,200 square feet (670 m^{2}) terminal, called the John Anderson Hardin Terminal, was built in 1999 and refurbished in 2015 to include state-of-the-art facilities for pilots and travelers. It is named after Rock Hill mayor John Hardin for his vision and commitment to Rock Hill/York County Airport between 1958 and 1963.

As a design for the future, an Airport Master Plan developed by UZA Airport Management was adopted by the Federal Aviation Administration on September 26, 2003. This dynamic plan was put in place to occur over a 20-year period from 2003–2022 and includes enhancements such as rehabilitating airfield lights (completed in 2010), overlaying the runway (completed in 2012), repaving taxiways (being completed in 2016), and extending the runway by 1,000 feet to accommodate transcontinental flights.

== Facilities and aircraft ==
Rock Hill/York County Airport covers an area of 401 acres (1.62 km^{2}) which contains one asphalt paved runway (2/20) measuring 5,500 feet (1,700 m) x 100 feet (30 m). As of September 2021, the airport handled 28,100 aircraft operations for the year, or about 77 per day, 95% of which are classified as general aviation. There are 146 aircraft based at this airport: 140 single piston/multi-engine aircraft, 2 jets/turbo-prop, and 4 helicopters.

Skytech is a full-service FBO at Rock Hill/York County Airport, located just north of the terminal building. Pilots, travelers, and aircraft owners benefit from Skytech’s Jet-A full-service fueling, 100LL full- and self-service fueling, on-demand car rental, and more. Piper and Pilatus aircraft sales as well as passenger charter services are also offered onsite through Skytech.

== See also ==
- List of airports in South Carolina
