= Blairsville, South Carolina =

Settlement in South Carolina, United States

Coordinates: 34°54′55″N 81°21′01″W

Blairsville is an unincorporated community in York County, in the U.S. state of South Carolina.

== History ==
The community was named after the local Blair family. A post office called Blairsville was established in 1815, and remained in operation until 1903.
