= Bullock Creek (South Carolina) =

Stream in York County, South Carolina, U.S.

Coordinates: 34°51′19″N 81°27′43″W

Bullock Creek is a stream in York County, South Carolina, in the United States.

Bullock Creek was named for the bison bulls once seen there.

== See also ==
- List of rivers of South Carolina
