= Steele Creek, North Carolina =

Steele Creek
- Neighborhood / Township
- Location within North Carolina
- Coordinates: 35.1345°N 80.9785°W
- Country: United States
- State: North Carolina
- County: Mecklenburg County
- City: Charlotte
- Council District: 3
- Founded: 1760
- Annexed: 1987–Ongoing

Government
  - City Council: Tiawana Brown

Area
  - Total: 47 sq mi (120 km^{2})
- Elevation: 600 ft (180 m)

Population (2020)
  - Total: 76,301 (Note: By borders of original Steele Creek Township, including areas annexed by the City of Charlotte.)
  - Density: 1,600/sq mi (630/km^{2})
- Time zone: UTC-5 (Eastern (EST))
- ZIP code: 28273, 28278
- Area codes: 704, 980
- GNIS feature ID: 1001413

Steele Creek is a community and neighborhood in the southwestern part of Mecklenburg County in North Carolina. It is generally defined geographically by the original boundaries of Steele Creek Township. Most of Steele Creek is within the city limits of Charlotte but the areas that have not yet been annexed are also recognized as a Township of North Carolina.

== Population ==
The population of the Steele Creek community was 76,301 as of 2020, roughly two-thirds of which is located within the City of Charlotte.

== History ==
=== Early ===
The Steele Creek community derives its name from the small creek bearing the same name. It is believed that name "Steele" was the family surname of Scots-Irish immigrants who settled in the area in the late 17th and early 18th centuries. The region was eventually designated as Steele Creek Township, one of the original 15 Townships of Mecklenburg County.

=== Modern ===
In 1959, the North Carolina State Legislature revised laws that govern how cities may annex adjacent areas, allowing municipalities to annex unincorporated lands without permission of those residents. This change in North Carolina law led to adoption of an aggressive annexation policy by the City of Charlotte, which repeatedly expanded its borders by annexing land within Steele Creek Township, which had never been formally incorporated.

Despite nearly two-thirds of Steele Creek being annexed by Charlotte, the region remained primarily rural farmland until the 2000s, when significant infrastructure improvements greatly accelerated the effects of suburban sprawl. The widening of NC 49, the replacement of the old Buster Boyd Bridge, and the opening of I-485, spurred tremendous growth in both residential and commercial development. Today Steele Creek is the fastest growing region of Charlotte/Mecklenburg County, with more than a 70% population boom between 2000 and 2007.

== Subdivisions ==
Steele Creek has several subdivisions within its area, most of which are residential. Listed here are the most notable subdivisions:

- Arrowood, a corridor of mostly commercial businesses and apartment complexes along Arrowood Road.
- Ayrsley is a mixed-use development between Westinghouse Boulevard and Interstate 485.
- Berewick, developed by Pappas Properties, is a mixed-use development between Shopton Road and Dixie River Road.
- Olde Whitehall, a corridor of mostly commercial and retail businesses along Interstate 485, between South Tryon Street and Arrowood Road.
- Palisades, a golf course community in the most southwestern part of Steele Creek, centered around the Palisades Country Club.
- Shopton, centered at intersection of Steele Creek Road and Shopton Road, is a mostly industrial zoned area.
- Yorkshire is a large residential subdivision between Choate Circle and Carowinds Boulevard.

== Schools and libraries ==
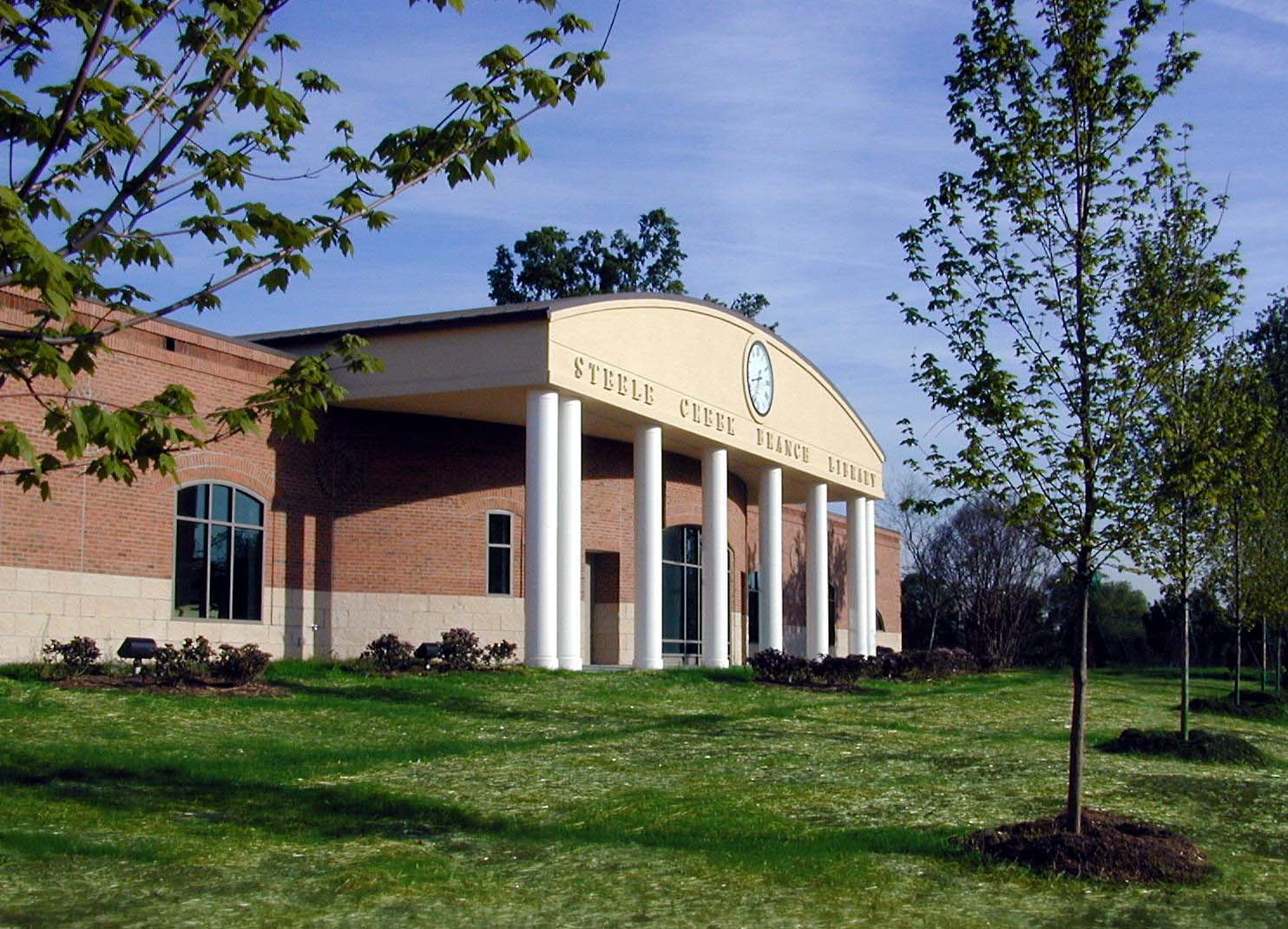
The Steele Creek branch of the Public Library of Charlotte and Mecklenburg County

=== School system ===
The first school in Steele Creek was founded in the 1780s. Today, Steele Creek is served by the Charlotte-Mecklenburg Schools (CMS) district. These include Olympic High, Palisades High, Kennedy Middle, Southwest Middle, Lake Wylie Elementary, Steele Creek Elementary, Winget Park Elementary, River Gate Elementary, Berewick Elementary, South Pine Academy and Palisades Park Elementary.

=== Libraries ===
Steele Creek is served by a branch of the Public Library of Charlotte and Mecklenburg County. The library is located on Steele Creek Road in front of Southwest Middle School.

== Infrastructure ==
=== Main thoroughfares ===
- Carowinds Boulevard
- General Paul R. Younts Expressway (I-77/US 21)
- Seddon Rusty Goode Freeway (I-485)
- Shopton Road West
- South Tryon Street/York Road (NC 49)
- Steele Creek Road (NC 160)
- Westinghouse Boulevard

=== Mass transit ===
The Charlotte Area Transit System (CATS) offers local and express bus service in the area.

Current routes:

- 16 - South Tryon: Connects between Rivergate Shopping Center and Center City.
- 41X - Steele Creek Express: Connects between Rivergate Shopping Center and Center City.
- 42 - Carowinds: Connects between Southpoint Business Park and I-485/South Boulevard (LYNX station).
- 55 - Westinghouse: Connects between Charlotte Premium Outlets and Sharon Road West (LYNX station).
- 56 - Arrowood: Connects between Charlotte Premium Outlets and Arrowood (LYNX station).

=== Utilities ===
Water and Trash pick-up is mostly serviced by the city of Charlotte, though third-party companies do service some developments in the area. Electricity is provided by Duke Energy, which holds a monopoly. Natural gas is provided by Piedmont Natural Gas, which holds a monopoly. Data/Telephone/Television service is all offered by AT&T, Charter Communications, Windstream Communications, and Comporium (Ayrsley area only).

=== Health care ===
Atrium Health Steele Creek is a healthcare pavilion that includes a 24-hour emergency department. Patients that require long-term care are transferred to another hospital, such as Atrium Health Pineville or Carolinas Medical Center. Outpatient services is also available at three Urgent Care centers: Atrium Health Urgent Care Steele Creek, Novant Health GoHealth Urgent Care–Berewick and Novant Health GoHealth Urgent Care–Steele Creek.

== Notable residents ==
- Mel Watt - Member of the United States House of Representatives, representing the North Carolina's 12th congressional district.

== See also ==
- Charlotte, North Carolina
- Lake Wylie
- Buster Boyd Bridge
