= Lake Wylie =

Man-made lake in North Carolina and South Carolina, United States

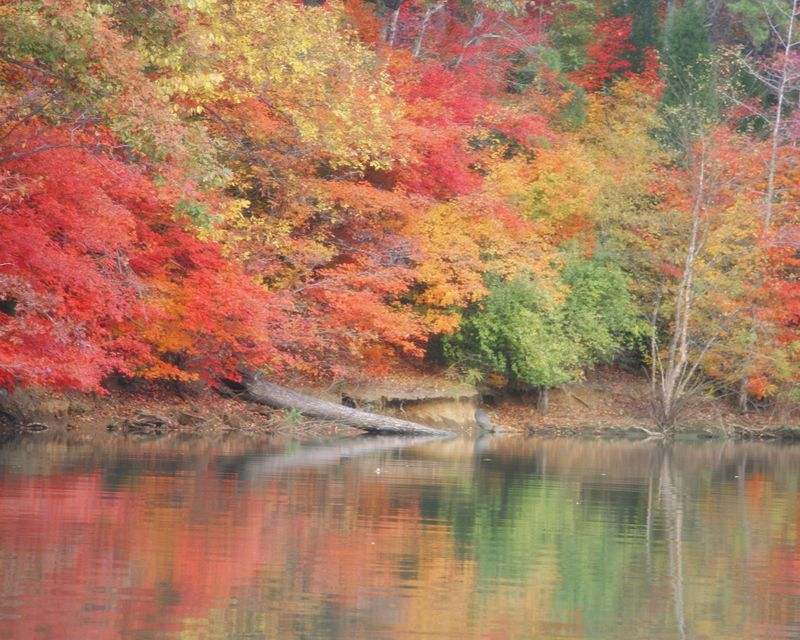
- Lake Wylie in the autumn

- Location within North Carolina Location within the United States
- Location: York County, South Carolina / Gaston / Mecklenburg counties, North Carolina, US
- Coordinates: 35°5′8.9″N 81°3′30.9″W
- Lake type: Reservoir
- Primary inflows: Catawba River
- Basin countries: United States
- Surface area: 20.9 mi^{2} (54 km^{2})
- Average depth: 20 ft (6.1 m)
- Max. depth: 82 ft (25 m)
- Shore length^{1}: 325 mi (523 km)
- Surface elevation: 564 ft (172 m)
- Islands: many
- Settlements: Charlotte, North Carolina; Lake Wylie, South Carolina; Steele Creek, North Carolina; Tega Cay, South Carolina; India Hook, South Carolina
- ^{1} Shore length is not a well-defined measure.

Lake Wylie is a reservoir or man-made lake in the U.S. states of South Carolina and North Carolina. The lake has a surface area of 13,400 acres (54 km^{2}) 20.9 square miles (54 km^{2}) and features 325 miles (523 km) of shoreline.

== History ==
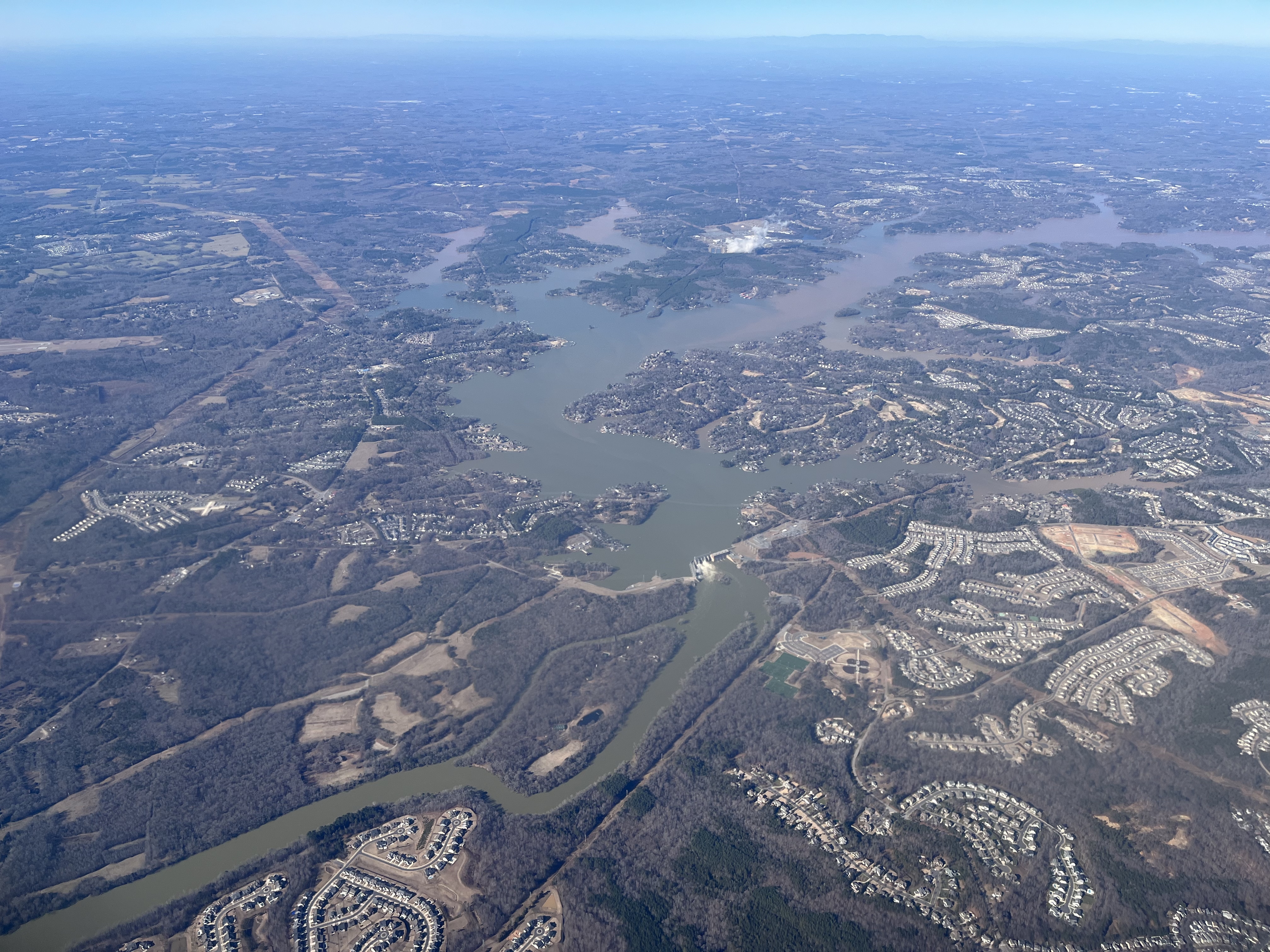
Aerial view in 2024

The man-made lake was first formed when the Catawba Power Company built the Catawba Dam and Power Plant near India Hook, South Carolina in 1904. This dam impounded the Catawba River and created Lake Catawba, which was utilized to create hydro-electric power. In 1905, the Catawba Power Company became part of the Southern Power Company.

In 1924, the Southern Power Company raised the level of the dam and built the new Catawba Hydroelectric Station to replace the original. This facility opened in August 1925, increasing the surface area of Lake Catawba from 668 acres (2.70 km^{2}) to 13,400 acres (54.2 km^{2}). The Southern Power Company was merged with Duke Power Company in 1927.

In October 1960, the power station was renamed the Wylie Hydroelectric Station, and the lake was renamed Lake Wylie in honor of W. Gil Wylie, one of the founders of the original Catawba Power Company that had created the lake and become Duke Power.

== Other information ==
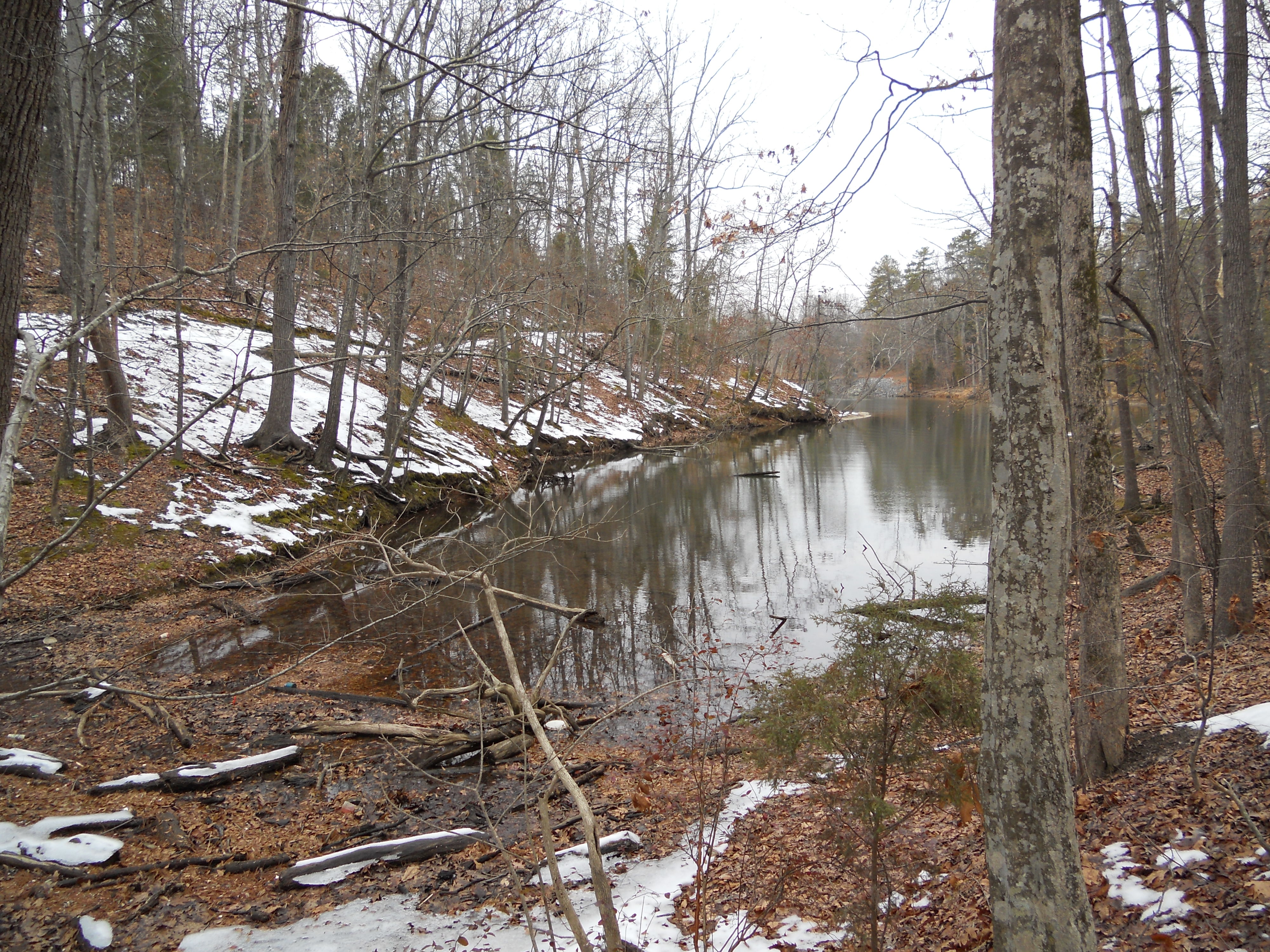
Lake Wylie cove in mid January

Lake Wylie's location on both the South Carolina and North Carolina borders makes it a common recreational destination for residents of nearby cities including Charlotte, Fort Mill, and Rock Hill. Duke Power manages six public boat access areas on the lake. There are also two towns that are located on Lake Wylie, including Tega Cay and Lake Wylie.

Lake Wylie is one of 11 lakes on the Catawba River and is the oldest lake in the Catawba River basin, with water being moved around each lake on the chain system through Duke Power. The lake has a surface area of approximately 13,443 acres (54.361 km^{2}) with 325 miles (523 km) of shoreline, and stretches from the Mountain Island Dam, south of Mountain Island Lake in North Carolina to the Wylie Dam on the south end of the lake. The average depth of the lake is just over 20 feet (6.1 m).

The Catawba Nuclear Generating Station is located on the south-western part of the lake, and draws its cooling water from the lake. Allen Steam Station located on the northern part of the lake (west of Charlotte) also draws its cooling water from the lake.

The South Fork River and Catawba River confluence is now submerged under Lake Wylie near the North Carolina/South Carolina state line.

== See also ==
- Lake Wylie, South Carolina
- Catawba Nuclear Generating Station
- Buster Boyd Bridge
- List of lakes in South Carolina
- McDowell Nature Preserve
