= Riverview, South Carolina =

- CDP
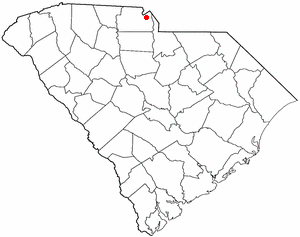
- Location of Riverview, South Carolina
- Coordinates: 35°00′43″N 80°58′58″W
- Country: United States
- State: South Carolina
- County: York

Area
  - Total: 1.25 sq mi (3.25 km^{2})
  - Land: 1.25 sq mi (3.23 km^{2})
  - Water: 0.0039 sq mi (0.01 km^{2})
- Elevation: 705 ft (215 m)

Population (2020)
  - Total: 1,748
  - Density: 1,401.1/sq mi (540.98/km^{2})
- Time zone: UTC-5 (Eastern (EST))
  - Summer (DST): UTC-4 (EDT)
- FIPS code: 45-61112
- GNIS feature ID: 2403481

Riverview is a census-designated place (CDP) in York County, South Carolina, United States, located southwest of Fort Mill along the Catawba River. The population was 708 at the 2000 census.

== Geography ==
According to the United States Census Bureau, the CDP has a total area of 2.3 square miles (5.9 km^{2}), all land.

== Demographics ==
Historical population
Census	Pop.	Note	%±
2020	1,748		—
U.S. Decennial Census

As of the census of 2000, there were 708 people, 277 households, and 193 families residing in the CDP. The population density was 309.7 inhabitants per square mile (119.6/km^{2}). There were 290 housing units at an average density of 126.8 per square mile (49.0/km^{2}). The racial makeup of the CDP was 96.75% White, 1.13% African American, 0.56% Native American, 0.14% Asian, 0.85% from other races, and 0.56% from two or more races. 1.69% of the population is Hispanic or Latino of any race.

There were 277 households, out of which 31.0% had children under the age of 18 living with them, 56.7% were married couples living together, 9.4% had a female householder with no husband present, and 30.0% were non-families. 25.3% of all households were made up of individuals, and 10.5% had someone living alone who was 65 years of age or older. The average household size was 2.56 and the average family size was 3.09.

In the CDP, the population was spread out, with 24.6% under the age of 18, 7.1% from 18 to 24, 31.2% from 25 to 44, 26.4% from 45 to 64, and 10.7% who were 65 years of age or older. The median age was 36 years. For every 100 females, there were 94.0 males. For every 100 females age 18 and over, there were 96.3 males.

The median income for a household in the CDP was $41,136, and the median income for a family was $51,806. Males had a median income of $38,906 versus $22,109 for females. The per capita income for the CDP was $17,930. None of the families and 0.5% of the population were living below the poverty line, including no under eighteens and none of those over 64.
