= York County, South Carolina =

County in South Carolina, United States

- County
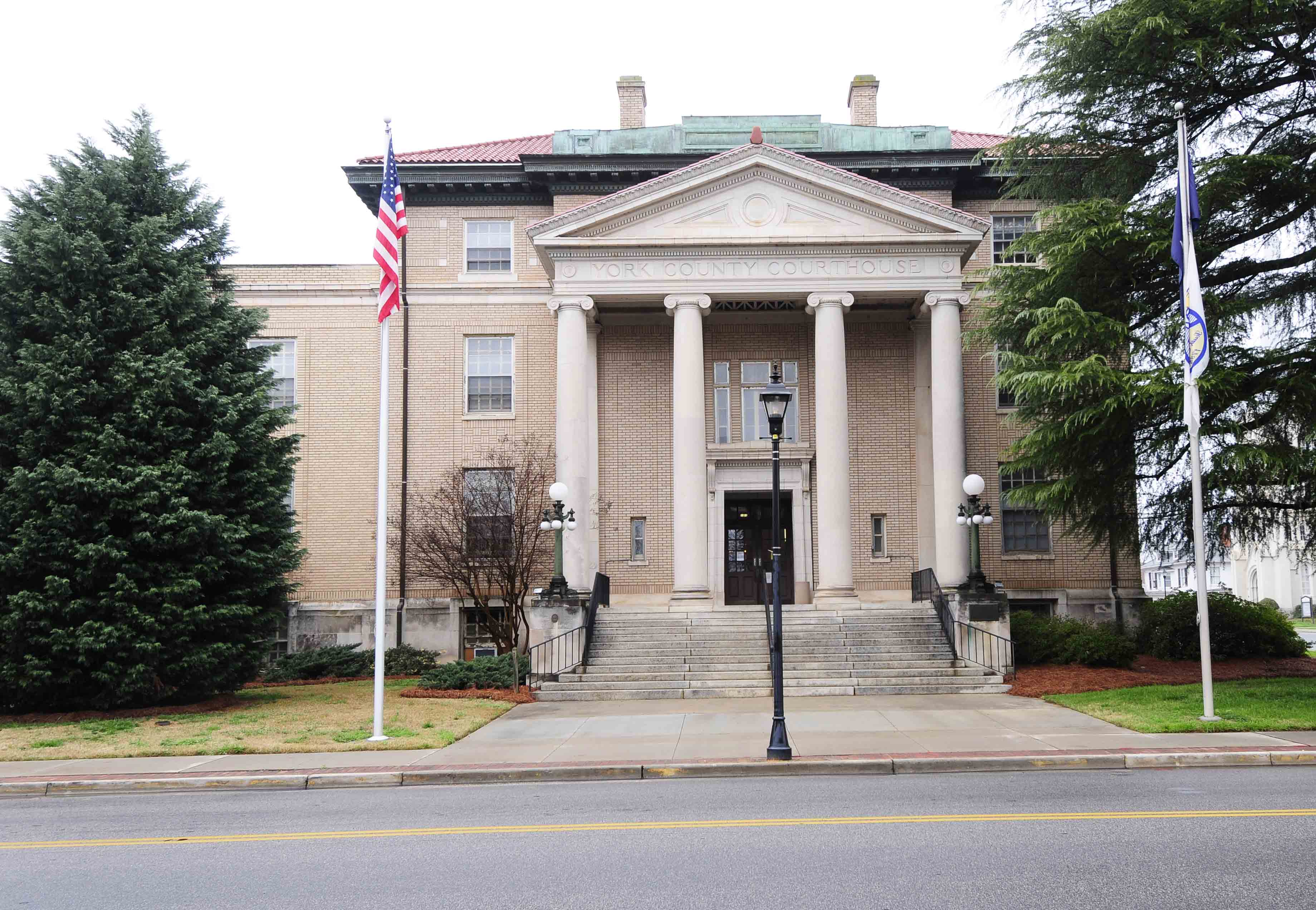
- York County Courthouse

- Seal

- Location within the U.S. state of South Carolina
- Coordinates: 34.97°N 81.18°W
- Country: United States
- State: South Carolina
- Founded: 1785
- Named for: James II of England
- Seat: York
- Largest city: Rock Hill

Area
  - Total: 696.09 sq mi (1,802.9 km^{2})
  - Land: 681.03 sq mi (1,763.9 km^{2})
  - Water: 15.06 sq mi (39.0 km^{2}) 2.16%

Population (2020)
  - Total: 282,090
  - Estimate (2025): 306,887 ▲
  - Density: 414.21/sq mi (159.93/km^{2})
- Time zone: UTC−5 (Eastern)
  - Summer (DST): UTC−4 (EDT)
- Congressional district: 5th
- Website: www.yorkcountygov.com

York County is a county on the north central border in the U.S. state of South Carolina. As of the 2020 census, the population was 282,090, making it the seventh-most populous county in the state. Its county seat is the city of York, and its most populous community is Rock Hill. One Interstate Highway serves the county, Interstate 77. York County is part of the Charlotte metropolitan area.

== History ==
=== Pre-colonial and early colonial history ===
With a population of nearly 6,000 at the time of first European contact, the native inhabitants, the Catawba, were primarily agriculturalists. Hernando de Soto passed through the area in the 1540s in his search for gold. Several decades later Juan Pardo recorded his observation of a predominantly Native American tribe, later confirmed to be the Catawba, in the vicinity of present-day Fort Mill, east of the Catawba River.

The Province of South Carolina was founded in 1670. Twelve years later, it was divided into three counties. One of these, Craven County, roughly encompassed the northern half of the colony (including the southern half of present-day York County). In contrast, the northern portion of York County was considered part of North Carolina.

The first European settlers in the Carolina Piedmont, traditionally called the South Carolina Upcountry, were Scots-Irish Presbyterians. They comprised the most numerous immigrants from the British Isles in the eighteenth century and the latest to arrive. Rising rent and land prices in western Pennsylvania drove them southward down the Great Wagon Road, and they began arriving in the Upcountry west of the Catawba River during the 1740s. They settled in present-day York County during the 1750s.

==== North Carolina's rule ====
Before the boundaries between the two Carolinas were fixed, the northern portion of York County was part of Bladen County, North Carolina, and in 1750 it was included in the newly created Anson County, North Carolina (the first land grants and deeds for the region were issued in Anson). In 1762 Mecklenburg County, North Carolina, was formed from western Anson and included present-day northern York County. Five years later, the area became part of Tryon County, North Carolina, which comprised all of North Carolina west of the Catawba River and south of Rowan County. This area would remain a part of Tryon County until 1772 when the boundary between North and South Carolina in this portion was finally established.

=== 18th century ===
After its transfer to South Carolina in 1772, much of the area was known as the New Acquisition. In 1785, York County was one of the original counties in the newly created state of South Carolina. Its boundaries remained unchanged until 1897 when a small portion of the northwestern corner (including the site of the Battle of Kings Mountain) was ceded to the newly formed Cherokee County, South Carolina.

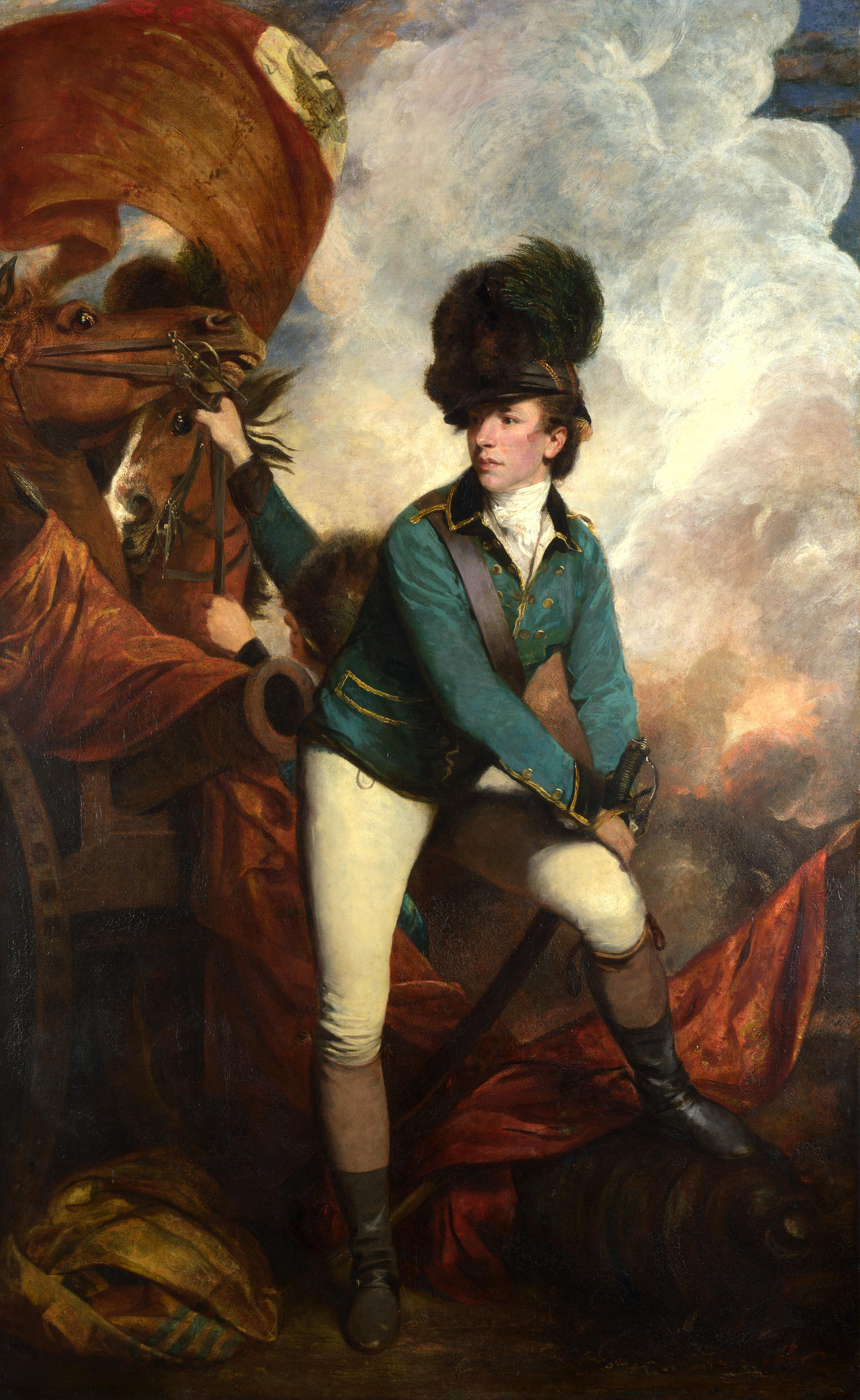
Portrait of Banastre Tarleton; oil by Sir Joshua Reynolds.

By 1780, the Carolina Upcountry had an estimated population of more than 250,000, predominantly Scots-Irish Presbyterians but with significant numbers of other Protestants from Great Britain. The Scots-Irish settled in a dispersed community pattern denoted by communal, clannish, family-related groups known as "clachans", much the same as in Pennsylvania and Ulster, Northern Ireland. The clachans developed around the Presbyterian Kirks, or meetinghouses, and became the forerunners of the congregations. In York County, the "Five B" churches, all Presbyterian—Bethany, Bethel, Bethesda, Beersheba, and Bullock's Creek—are the county's oldest.

Sandwiched between unfriendly natives to the west, Cherokee, Shawnee and Creek Native American tribes, and indifference on the part of colonial officials in Charleston, who considered residents of the Backcountry uncivilized, the early settlers frequently found themselves targets of Native American raids. The local militia became an early police force, patrolling the area for possible Native American or enslaved rebellions and controlling the seemingly numerous outlaw bands that roamed the region. Militia units, or "Beat Companies", enrolled every able-bodied man on the frontier.

The Battle of Kings Mountain, which was fought in northwestern York County

Residents of the Upcountry were initially slow to take sides in the American Revolutionary War, content to remain neutral as long as left unmolested; the conflict was initially viewed as one between the British Crown and Charleston plutocrats. The New Acquisition entered into vocal opposition to Royal authority in 1780 only after three "invasions" of the region: the first by Banastre Tarleton and his "Green Dragoons", and two more by Lord Cornwallis. Most of the state had capitulated to the British after their capture of Charleston. Still, after the Battle of Waxhaws in nearby Lancaster County in May 1780, residents of the New Acquisition took part in a regional resistance. Led by men such as William "Billy" Hill, William Bratton, and Samuel Watson, both the battles of Huck's Defeat and Kings Mountain, were fought in the New Acquisition. These defeats forced Cornwallis northward and led to his ultimate surrender at Yorktown.

Following American independence Upcountry residents enjoyed a more significant share of administration in their region. The area experienced phenomenal growth after the war. In the first United States census (1790), York County had a population of 6,604; 923 were listed as enslaved, with just nine men enslaving 230. Less than 15% of the county's population lived in bondage in 1790, while the state averaged 30%.

A county seat was laid out in 1786 at Fergus' Cross Roads, where several roads converged near the geographic center of the county. The new town was first known as the village of York, or more commonly, York Court House. In 1841, the town was incorporated as "Yorkville." In 1823, its population (as recorded by local architect, Robert Mills) was 441—which included 292 whites and 149 blacks. By 1840, the population had reached 600; in 1850, Yorkville consisted of 93 dwellings and 617 inhabitants. In the years just before the Civil War, the town gained a reputation as a summer resort for many Lowcountry planters trying to escape the malarial swamps of the region for the more moderate climate to be found in the Upstate. By 1860, the town's population had topped 1,300—an increase of more than 125% in only one decade. During the American Civil War, the town became a focal point for residents from the Lowcountry as a refugee destination during U.S. Army occupation of their towns.

=== 19th century ===
==== Early 19th century through Civil War ====
With the introduction of the cotton gin in the 1790s, the county's economic prospects increased as the importance of "King Cotton" grew, and slavery became an integral part of the economy. In 1800, 25% of all white families in the Upcountry enslaved people, but by 1820, nearly 40% were enslavers. Slavery expanded significantly in York County between 1800 and 1860, with most enslaved on small and medium-sized farms rather than more extensive plantations. In 1800, whites made up 82.10% of the total population in York County, but by 1860, the white percentage of the total population had dropped to 62.50%. Figures from 1860 reveal that enslavement in York County had decreased, with approximately 70% of all farms enslaving fewer than ten people and less than 3% of the farms with 50 or more.

The proportion of York District farms in 1860 was:

- Less than 50 acres (0.20 km^{2}): 20%
- 51 to 100 acres (0.2 to 0.4 km^{2} (0 sq mi)): 23.9%
- 101 to 500 acres (0.4 to 2 km^{2} (1 sq mi)): 53.9%
- More than 500 acres (2.0 km^{2}): 2.7%

In 1810, the York District had an increased population of more than 10,000, of which over 3,000 were enslaved. By 1850, York District included 15,000 residents, over 40% enslaved. On the eve of the American Civil War, the county's population had grown to approximately 21,500, with almost 1/2 enslaved laborers. York County was heavily tied to agriculture, with 93% of the workforce raising crops in 1850, while the rest of the United States averaged a 78% agricultural workforce.

In 1825, only three post offices operated in York County, at Yorkville, Blairsville, and Hopewell, but by 1852, York District had 27. The county's first newspaper, The Yorkville Pioneer, was established in 1823 (it ran for little more than a year), and several other attempts followed until The Yorkville Enquirer was first published in 1855 (and which remains in publication today).

Chartered in 1848, the Kings Mountain Railroad Company began construction of a connecting line between Yorkville and the Charlotte and South Carolina Railway at Chester (completed in 1852). Rock Hill, located along the Charlotte and South Carolina route, rapidly developed as a transportation center in eastern York County, boasting 100 residents in 1860.

At the American Civil War outbreak, more than a dozen academies were operating in the county. The Kings Mountain Military Academy in Yorkville was the most famous, founded in 1854 by Micah Jenkins and Asbury Coward.

On the eve of the Civil War, York District was one of the more populated districts in Upstate South Carolina. There were 14 infantry companies formed in York County after South Carolina declared secession. Of the 4,379 soldiers enlisted from York County, 805 died, and many more were wounded. Only one minor battle was fought in the York District, the battle for the Catawba Bridge at Nations Ford in 1865.

==== Late 19th century ====
Between 1868 and 1871, York County became a hotbed of Ku Klux Klan attacks on African Americans. The Klan had an estimated 2,000 members in the county in 1871. Among their activities was the lynching of Jim Williams on March 6, 1871, led by Dr. J. Rufus Bratton. K Troop of the 7th Cavalry Regiment was charged with suppressing them. To escape the violence, in November 1871, a large group of local blacks, led by Rev. Elias Hill, a disabled anti-Klan activist beaten by Klansmen, emigrated to Liberia. York is believed by some to be the setting for Thomas F. Dixon, Jr.'s novel The Clansman: A Historical Romance of the Ku Klux Klan, later made into the motion picture "The Birth of a Nation", and Bratton is said to have been the inspiration for one of its characters.

During the Reconstruction era, many of York County's more prominent property owners were forced to sell portions of their land to smaller farmers. The average farm size in York County dropped considerably while the number of small farming operations increased. Late-19th-century agriculture in York County was characterized by relatively small farm operations, ignorance of soil qualities, and the benefits of diversification, eventually leading to the agricultural difficulties of the 1890s, 1920s, and 1930s.

Railroad development continued in York County after the war's end. In 1880, the Rock Hill Cotton Factory, the first steam-powered cotton factory in South Carolina, ushered in a new era of agricultural expansion and industrial development. The Rock Hill Buggy Company, founded by John Gary Anderson, eventually grew to become the Anderson Motor Company, the first automobile manufacturing facility in the South. Concurrently, Rock Hill's population increased from 809 to over 5,500 from 1880 to 1895.

=== 20th century ===
Cotton production remained the dominant agricultural export in early 20th century York County, with the textile industry continuing to develop. Rock Hill became the hub of this industry while mills blossomed throughout the county. South Carolina's peak cotton crop was harvested in 1921, and thereafter, cotton production began a long and steady decline due in part to boll weevil infestations, soil erosion, and mechanization of farming technologies. The New Deal programs of the 1930s prodded farmers into switching to different crops, with cotton gradually becoming less and less the focal point of the county's economy.

In 1904, the Catawba Dam and Power Plant was completed, and Lake Wylie was created. The Catawba Power Company was founded in 1899 by William C. Whitner, Dr. Gill Wylie, and Robert Wylie. Construction began in 1900, and when it was finally completed, the dam and power plant were among the most important engineering accomplishments in the southeastern United States. The venture eventually led to the formation of Duke Power Company, and a later series of dams and hydroelectric facilities were built on the Catawba in both North and South Carolina. The Catawba Power Plant sparked the industrialization of the Catawba Valley; by 1911, more than a million textile spindles were powered by it.

== Geography and climate ==
Interactive map of York County

According to the U.S. Census Bureau, the county has a total area of 696.09 square miles (1,802.9 km^{2}), of which 681.03 square miles (1,763.9 km^{2}) is land and 15.06 square miles (39.0 km^{2}) (2.16%) is water.

York County is located in north central South Carolina, along the North Carolina border. Its natural boundaries are the Broad River on the west and the Catawba River on the east. All of York County is within the piedmont region. Although heavily wooded in many rural areas and retaining a predominantly rural character in its western sector, York County is part of the Charlotte metropolitan area and includes Rock Hill, the county's largest city, as well as the smaller cities of Tega Cay and York and the smaller towns of Clover, Fort Mill, Hickory Grove, McConnells, Sharon, and Lake Wylie.

Henry's Knob, a mountain and site of a former open-pit mining operation for the world's largest deposit of kyanite stands at 1,120 ft (340 m) above sea level. the mountain is near the North Carolina border and the town of Clover. According to United States Environmental Protection Agency (EPA) records, the mine is listed as a Superfund Alternative Site for acid mine drainage and groundwater contamination.

=== Climate ===
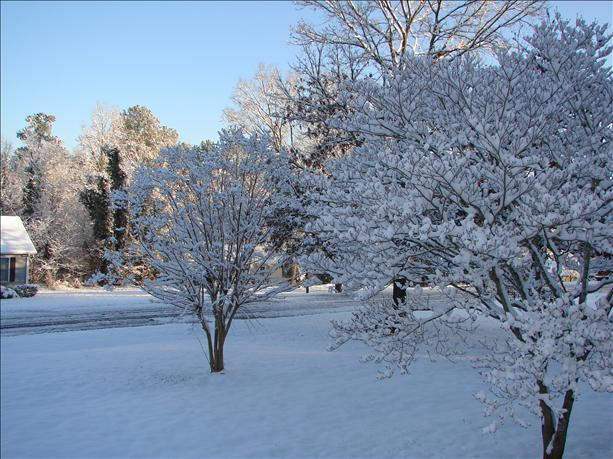
A general 5-inch snow in York County

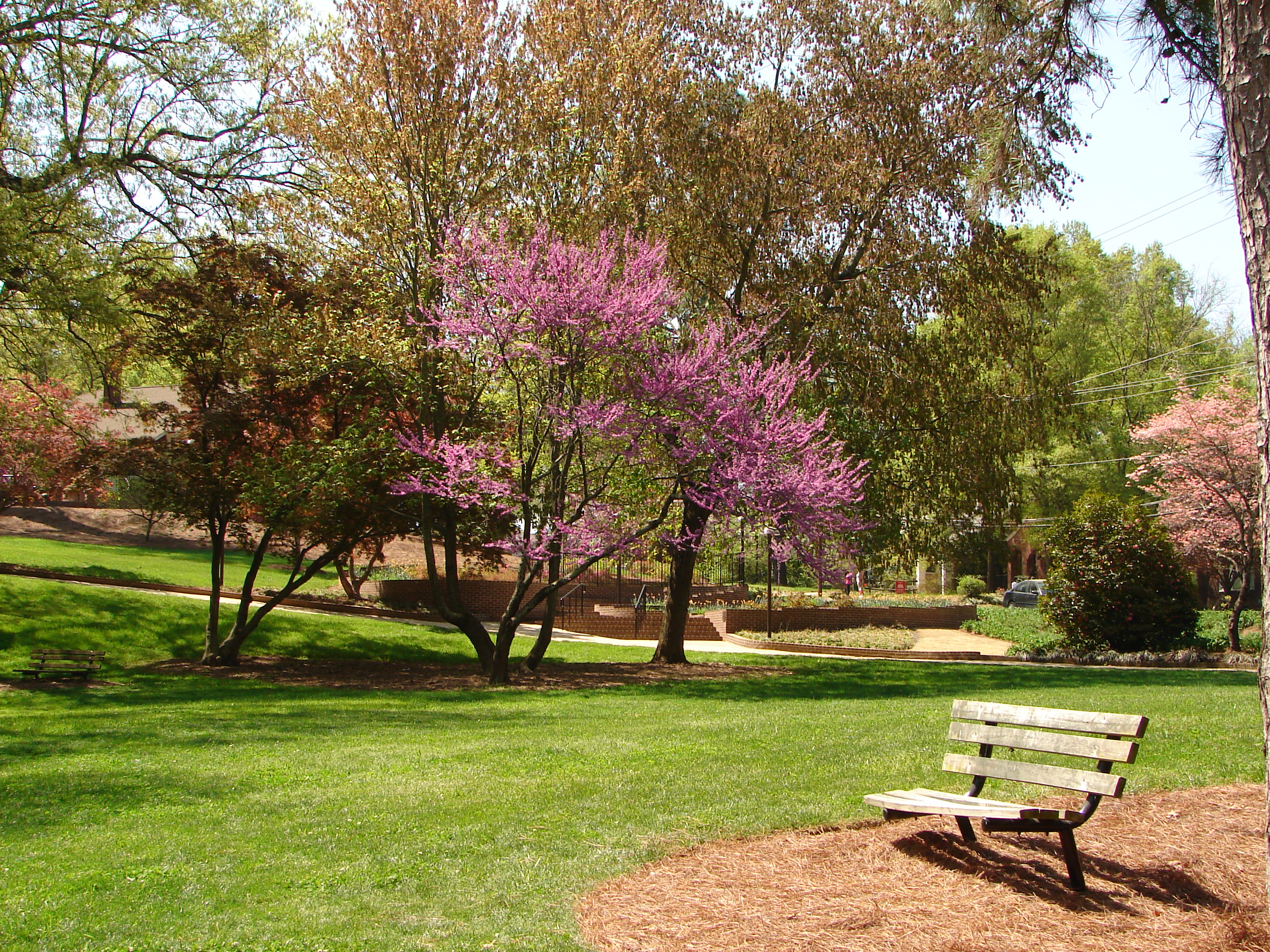
Glencairn Gardens in Rock Hill

York County has a humid subtropical climate characterized by hot, humid summers and cool, dry winters. Precipitation does not vary greatly between seasons. July is the hottest month, with an average high temperature of 91 °F (33 °C) and an average low temperature of 71 °F (22 °C). The coldest month of the year is January, when the average high temperature is around 53 °F (12 °C) and the average low temperature bottoms out at 33 °F (1 °C). The warmest temperature ever recorded in York County was in Rock Hill, was 106 °F (41 °C), on August 21, 1983, and the coldest temperature ever recorded was also in Rock Hill at −6 °F (−21 °C), on January 21, 1985.

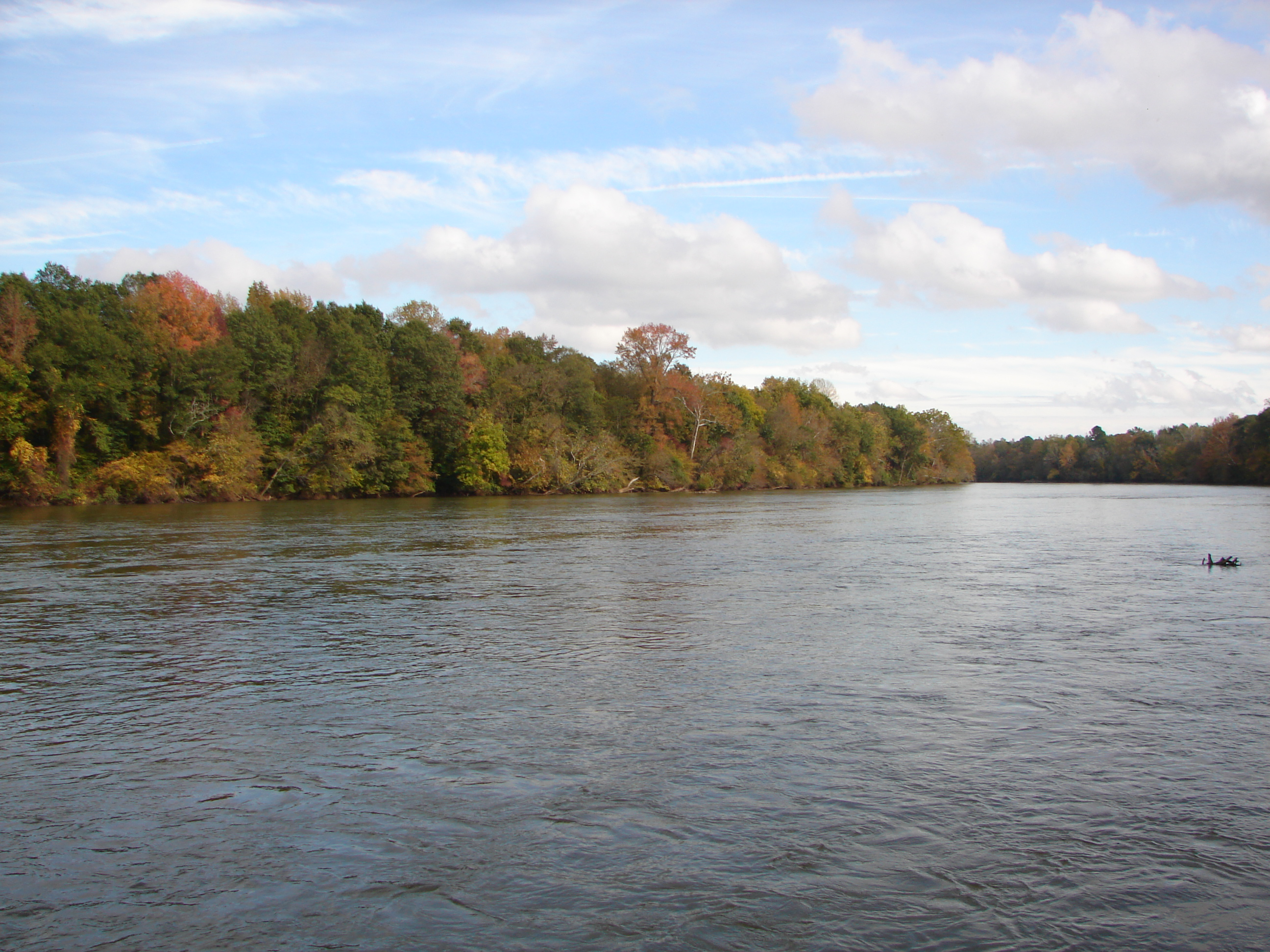
A view of the Catawba River in the Autumn

=== Mountains ===
- Henry's Knob
- Joe's Mountain
- King's Mountain
- Nanny Mountain

=== Major water bodies ===
- Broad River
- Catawba River
- Lake Wylie

=== National protected areas/sites ===
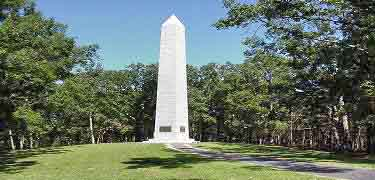
Kings Mountain National Monument

- Catawba Reservation
- Kings Mountain National Military Park (part)
- Historic Brattonsville

=== State and local protected areas/sites ===
- Anne Springs Close Greenway - Adventure Road/Lake Haigler
- Brattonsville Historic District
- Draper Wildlife Management Area
- Herbert Kirsh Wildlife Conservation Area
- James Ross Wildlife Reservation
- Kings Mountain State Park
- Museum of York County
- McConnells Tract
- Rock Hill Blackjacks Heritage Preserve/Wildlife Management Area
- Worth Mountain Wildlife Management Area

=== Adjacent counties ===
A border county separating North Carolina and South Carolina, York County shares boundaries with the following counties in both states:

- Gaston County, North Carolina – north
- Mecklenburg County, North Carolina – northeast
- Lancaster County – east
- Chester County – south
- Union County – southwest
- Cherokee County – west
- Cleveland County, North Carolina – northwest

=== Major highways ===
- I-77
- US 21
- US 21 Bus.
- US 321
- US 321 Bus.
- SC 5
- SC 5 Bus.
- SC 5 Conn.
- SC 49
- SC 55
- SC 72
- SC 122
- SC 160
- SC 160 Conn.
- SC 160 Truck
- SC 161
- SC 161 Bus.
- SC 274
- SC 322
- SC 901

=== Major infrastructure ===
- Rock Hill/York County Airport

== Demographics ==
Historical population
Census	Pop.	Note	%±
1790	6,604		—
1800	10,250		55.2%
1810	10,032		−2.1%
1820	14,936		48.9%
1830	17,790		19.1%
1840	18,383		3.3%
1850	19,433		5.7%
1860	21,502		10.6%
1870	24,286		12.9%
1880	30,713		26.5%
1890	38,831		26.4%
1900	41,684		7.3%
1910	47,718		14.5%
1920	50,536		5.9%
1930	53,418		5.7%
1940	58,663		9.8%
1950	71,596		22.0%
1960	78,760		10.0%
1970	85,216		8.2%
1980	106,720		25.2%
1990	131,497		23.2%
2000	164,614		25.2%
2010	226,073		37.3%
2020	282,090		24.8%
2025 (est.)	306,887	▲	8.8%
U.S. Decennial Census; 1790–1960 1900–1990; 1990–2000 2010 2020

=== Racial and ethnic composition ===
York County, South Carolina – Racial and ethnic composition Note: the US Census treats Hispanic/Latino as an ethnic category. This table excludes Latinos from the racial categories and assigns them to a separate category. Hispanics/Latinos may be of any race.
Race / Ethnicity (NH = Non-Hispanic)	Pop 1980	Pop 1990	Pop 2000	Pop 2010	Pop 2020	% 1980	% 1990	% 2000	% 2010	% 2020
White alone (NH)	81,086	103,019	125,737	164,371	188,015	75.98%	78.34%	76.38%	72.71%	66.65%
Black or African American alone (NH)	23,520	26,293	31,380	42,608	51,298	22.04%	20.00%	19.06%	18.85%	18.18%
Native American or Alaska Native alone (NH)	1,254	767	1,359	1,777	1,892	1.18%	0.58%	0.83%	0.79%	0.67%
Asian alone (NH)	179	664	1,448	3,394	8,745	0.17%	0.50%	0.88%	1.50%	3.10%
Native Hawaiian or Pacific Islander alone (NH)	x	x	33	72	111	x	x	0.02%	0.03%	0.04%
Other race alone (NH)	75	19	110	255	1,145	0.07%	0.01%	0.07%	0.11%	0.41%
Mixed race or Multiracial (NH)	x	x	1,327	3,521	11,946	x	x	0.81%	1.56%	4.23%
Hispanic or Latino (any race)	606	735	3,220	10,075	18,938	0.57%	0.56%	1.96%	4.46%	6.71%
Total	106,720	131,497	164,614	226,073	282,090	100.00%	100.00%	100.00%	100.00%	100.00%

=== 2020 census ===
As of the 2020 census, there were 282,090 people residing in the county, with 107,812 households and 74,041 families.

The median age was 39.0 years, 24.5% of residents were under the age of 18, and 15.3% were 65 or older. For every 100 females there were 92.9 males and for every 100 females age 18 and over there were 89.4 males.

Of the 107,812 households, 35.0% had children under 18 living with them, 26.5% had a female householder with no spouse or partner present, 24.1% were composed of individuals, and 9.4% had someone living alone who was 65 or older.

There were 114,656 housing units, 6.0% of which were vacant; 72.4% of occupied units were owner-occupied and 27.6% were renter-occupied, with homeowner and rental vacancy rates of 1.2% and 7.8%, respectively.

77.3% of residents lived in urban areas, while 22.7% lived in rural areas.

=== 2010 census ===
At the 2010 census, there were 226,073 people, 85,864 households, and 61,089 families residing in the county. The population density was 332.2 inhabitants per square mile (128.3/km^{2}). There were 94,196 housing units at an average density of 138.4 per square mile (53.4/km^{2}). The racial makeup of the county was 74.8% white, 19.0% black or African American, 1.5% Asian, 0.9% American Indian, 0.1% Pacific Islander, 1.9% from other races, and 1.8% from two or more races. Those of Hispanic or Latino origin made up 4.5% of the population. In terms of ancestry, 14.0% were German, 12.3% were Irish, 10.2% were English, 9.2% were American, and 6.0% were Scotch-Irish.

Of the 85,864 households, 36.8% had children under the age of 18 living with them, 52.6% were married couples living together, 13.9% had a female householder with no husband present, 28.9% were non-families, and 23.5% of all households were made up of individuals. The average household size was 2.59 and the average family size was 3.06. The median age was 37.2 years.

The median income for a household in the county was $51,925 and the median income for a family was $65,188. Males had a median income of $47,017 versus $34,096 for females. The per capita income for the county was $25,707. About 9.4% of families and 12.5% of the population were below the poverty line, including 17.5% of those under age 18 and 8.6% of those age 65 or over.

=== 2000 census ===
At the 2000 census, there were 164,614 people, 61,051 households, and 44,933 families residing in the county. The population density was 241 people per square mile (93 people/km^{2}). There were 66,061 housing units at an average density of 97 per square mile (37/km^{2}). The racial makeup of the county was 77.25% White, 19.16% Black or African American, 0.85% Native American, 0.89% Asian, 0.02% Pacific Islander, 0.93% from other races, and 0.91% from two or more races. 1.96% of the population were Hispanic or Latino of any race. 20.9% were of American, 8.8% Irish, 8.8% German, 8.8% English and 7.2% Scotch-Irish ancestry according to Census 2000.

There were 61,051 households, out of which 35.40% had children under the age of 18 living with them, 56.10% were married couples living together, 13.30% had a female householder with no husband present, and 26.40% were non-families. 21.30% of all households were made up of individuals, and 6.90% had someone living alone who was 65 years of age or older. The average household size was 2.63 and the average family size was 3.05.

In the county, the population was spread out, with 26.30% under the age of 18, 9.50% from 18 to 24, 31.10% from 25 to 44, 22.80% from 45 to 64, and 10.40% who were 65 years of age or older. The median age was 35 years. For every 100 females there were 94.00 males. For every 100 females age 18 and over, there were 90.20 males.

The median income for a household in the county was $44,539, and the median income for a family was $51,815. Males had a median income of $36,713 versus $24,857 for females. The per capita income for the county was $20,536. About 7.30% of families and 10.00% of the population were below the poverty line, including 12.10% of those under age 18 and 9.60% of those age 65 or over.

== Law and government ==
=== Law enforcement ===
In 2014, a York County Sheriff's deputy shot an unarmed 70-year-old man after the deputy mistook his cane for a rifle. The deputy was found to have acted appropriately.

=== Politics ===
In 2020, Joe Biden received 41.0 percent of the vote. This was the best result for a Democrat since 1980 when Jimmy Carter received 50.2 percent of the vote and won York County.

United States presidential election results for York County, South Carolina
Year	Republican		Democratic		Third party(ies)	
Year	No.	%	No.	%	No.	%
1892	319	12.60%	2,212	87.40%	0	0.00%
1896	152	7.01%	2,013	92.81%	4	0.18%
1900	37	3.00%	1,198	97.00%	0	0.00%
1904	25	2.04%	1,198	97.96%	0	0.00%
1908	29	1.77%	1,606	98.23%	0	0.00%
1912	12	0.72%	1,641	98.50%	13	0.78%
1916	23	1.62%	1,393	98.31%	1	0.07%
1920	35	2.16%	1,583	97.84%	0	0.00%
1924	31	2.11%	1,385	94.09%	56	3.80%
1928	227	16.50%	1,145	83.21%	4	0.29%
1932	129	3.58%	3,476	96.42%	0	0.00%
1936	69	2.19%	3,083	97.81%	0	0.00%
1940	118	4.49%	2,508	95.51%	0	0.00%
1944	127	4.55%	2,637	94.48%	27	0.97%
1948	167	4.69%	1,412	39.64%	1,983	55.67%
1952	5,281	41.34%	7,495	58.66%	0	0.00%
1956	3,508	30.41%	6,835	59.25%	1,192	10.33%
1960	5,512	38.77%	8,707	61.23%	0	0.00%
1964	7,292	46.62%	8,346	53.36%	4	0.03%
1968	7,596	37.48%	5,571	27.49%	7,102	35.04%
1972	14,441	68.68%	6,374	30.31%	211	1.00%
1976	9,843	41.00%	14,099	58.73%	63	0.26%
1980	11,265	46.85%	12,075	50.22%	703	2.92%
1984	20,008	67.99%	9,273	31.51%	146	0.50%
1988	21,657	65.02%	11,458	34.40%	193	0.58%
1992	21,297	48.74%	15,844	36.26%	6,553	15.00%
1996	22,222	52.26%	16,873	39.68%	3,428	8.06%
2000	33,776	62.14%	19,251	35.42%	1,324	2.44%
2004	45,234	64.45%	24,226	34.52%	721	1.03%
2008	54,500	58.17%	37,918	40.47%	1,278	1.36%
2012	59,546	59.42%	39,131	39.05%	1,533	1.53%
2016	66,754	58.37%	41,593	36.37%	6,010	5.26%
2020	82,727	57.43%	59,008	40.96%	2,315	1.61%
2024	88,239	58.80%	59,600	39.72%	2,220	1.48%

== Economy ==
In 2022, the GDP was $16.7 billion (about $56,078 per capita), and the real GDP was $14.1 billion (about $47,246 per capita) in chained 2017 dollars.

As of April 2024, some of the largest employers in the county include 7-Eleven, Bank of America, Continental AG, Food Lion, Meritor, Schaeffler Group, Walmart, and Wells Fargo.

Employment and Wage Statistics by Industry in York County, South Carolina - Q3 2023
Industry	Employment Counts	Employment Percentage (%)	Average Annual Wage ($)
Accommodation and Food Services	11,769	11.3	21,996
Administrative and Support and Waste Management and Remediation Services	5,831	5.6	45,188
Agriculture, Forestry, Fishing and Hunting	391	0.4	36,244
Arts, Entertainment, and Recreation	3,009	2.9	22,568
Construction	4,893	4.7	66,092
Educational Services	9,303	8.9	52,832
Finance and Insurance	3,788	3.6	91,416
Health Care and Social Assistance	11,376	10.9	51,948
Information	1,948	1.9	92,092
Management of Companies and Enterprises	2,562	2.5	106,704
Manufacturing	10,968	10.5	67,080
Mining, Quarrying, and Oil and Gas Extraction	42	0.0	81,744
Other Services (except Public Administration)	3,005	2.9	44,252
Professional, Scientific, and Technical Services	4,725	4.5	83,304
Public Administration	4,024	3.9	54,964
Real Estate and Rental and Leasing	1,936	1.9	117,000
Retail Trade	13,154	12.6	37,492
Transportation and Warehousing	5,348	5.1	50,908
Utilities	1,199	1.2	101,972
Wholesale Trade	4,983	4.8	100,152
Total	104,254	100.0%	56,684

== Education ==
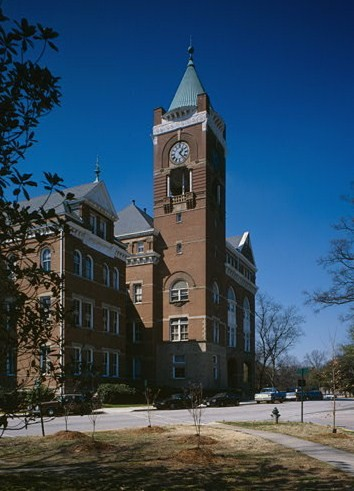
Main Building at Winthrop University in Rock Hill

York County has four public school districts. District One serves central and western York County, including the town of York; District Two serves northern York County and the town of Clover; District Three serves the City of Rock Hill and southern York County; District Four serves eastern York County and the town of Fort Mill. York County is the home of York Technical College, Clinton College, and Winthrop University, all located in Rock Hill.

== Media ==
York County is home to two free daily online newspapers that also print monthly newspapers, the YoCoNews that covers all of York and Lancaster counties, and the Tega Cay Sun that covers Tega Cay and Fort Mill

== Communities ==
=== Cities ===
- Rock Hill (largest community)
- Tega Cay
- York (county seat)

=== Towns ===
- Clover
- Fort Mill
- Hickory Grove
- McConnells
- Sharon
- Smyrna (partly in Cherokee County)

=== Census-designated places ===
- Baxter Village
- Catawba
- India Hook (mostly annexed into the City of Rock Hill)
- Lake Wylie
- Lesslie
- Newport (mostly annexed into the City of Rock Hill)
- Riverview

=== Other unincorporated communities ===
- Bethany
- Bethel
- Blairsville
- Bowling Green
- Bullock Creek
- Filbert
- Holy Islamville
- Hopewell
- Ogden
- Red River
- Smith
- Tirzah

=== Former places ===
- Balloon, former community
- Ebenezer, former town
- Oakdale, former community

== See also ==
- List of counties in South Carolina
- National Register of Historic Places listings in York County, South Carolina
