= Battle of Mobley's Meeting House =

1780 battle

- Part of the American Revolutionary War
Date	8 June 1780
Location	present-day Fairfield County, South Carolina 34°27′12″N 81°16′21″W
Result	Patriot victory

Belligerents
(United States) Patriot militia	(Kingdom of Great Britain) Loyalist militia

Commanders and leaders
(United States) William Bratton	(Kingdom of Great Britain) Robert Coleman

Strength
100–200	About 200

Casualties and losses
None	Few

The Battle of Mobley's Meeting House (also sometimes called Gibson's Meeting House) was an engagement that occurred during the American Revolutionary War in the Mobley Settlement, Fairfield County, South Carolina during the southern campaign of Lord Cornwallis.

On 8 June 1780, a small body of Whig militia led by Colonel William Bratton surprised a gathering point of Tory militia at Mobley's Meeting House, about 6 miles (9.7 km) west of present-day Winnsboro. Many of the Tories tried to escape by descending a steep embankment; this attempt led to more casualties than were caused by the actual firefight. A few Tories holed up in a blockhouse but were flushed out and defeated.

The battle was one a string of small victories by Whig militia that raised morale and support for their cause after the Continental Army suffered major defeats at Charleston and Waxhaws in May 1780, and preceded more organized resistance led by militia leaders like Thomas Sumter and Francis Marion.

== Background ==
Throughout 1779 and early 1780, the British "southern strategy" to regain control of its rebellious provinces in the American Revolutionary War went well, with successful amphibious operations against Savannah, Georgia and Charleston, South Carolina, and a routing of the few remaining Continental Army troops in South Carolina in the May 29, 1780 Battle of Waxhaws. The British, in complete control of both South Carolina and Georgia, established outposts in the interior of both states to recruit Tories and to suppress Whig dissent.

One of these outposts was established at Rocky Mount, near the confluence of Rocky Creek and the Catawba River, south of present-day Great Falls, South Carolina. This outpost was garrisoned by a regiment of New York Volunteers under the command of Lieutenant Colonel George Turnbull. Another outpost was established at Shirer's Ferry, near the Dutch Fork area on the east bank of the Broad River, which was used as a rallying point for Tory militia.

== Prelude ==
Tories in the area began raiding and plundering Whig properties, and in early June 1780 established a camp at Mobley's Meeting House, about 12 miles (19 km) north of Shirer's Ferry, located on a high embankment on a branch of the Little River in Fairfield District. They were under the general command of Colonel Robert Coleman of Fairfield District, Colonel Joseph Fleuquinyan and Captain William Nichols. This group had plundered many of the possessions of Whigs in the area, in particular members of the Hampton family, and had sent John and Henry Hampton as prisoners to Lord Cornwallis at Camden. Thus laden down with booty, they awaited British assistance.

Richard Winn, a prominent Whig leader in the area, began to rally supporter to his side. By June 7 he had rallied a force of between one and two hundred men in the New Acquisition District (roughly York County, South Carolina). Its principal commanders were Colonel William Bratton, who had been leading Whig militia since the war began in 1775, as well as Colonels Edward Lacey, John McClure, Samuel Watson, Cooper, and William Hill. This group was composed in large part of the Whig forces that had just the day before routed and scattered a Tory gathering at Beckhamville, South Carolina. Colonel Bratton was elected overall field commander for the engagement, which rode for Mobley's that day, arriving in the early morning hours. They found that the camp, although it had a fortified blockhouse and the meetinghouse itself was of sturdy construction, was not particularly alert against possible attack, and planned a surprise attack.

== Battle ==
The attack occurred at daybreak with an assault on the church and blockhouse. The Whig forces attacked from three sides, leaving the fourth uncovered as it was thought that its steep embankment was too hazardous to climb for an attack or to descend in a retreat. However, during the confusion and panic, a number of Tories attempted just that and were injured in the process. Few casualties were noted on either side other than those resulting from falls down the embankment. Much of the plunder was recovered and restored to the owners, and a significant number of prisoners were taken and sent to North Carolina. According to Whig reports, they suffered no casualties in the brief battles, while the Tories suffered a few each killed and captured.

== Aftermath ==
After the battle, some of the Whigs immediately left for North Carolina while others stayed in South Carolina and returned to their homes. Colonel Turnbull, the British commander at Rocky Mount, sent the New York Volunteers (the Green Coat Tories) under Captain Christian Huck in reprisal. Huck's force went on a minor rampage, destroying Richard Winn's plantation, the home and parsonage of the Reverend John Simpson, and attacking a small company of Whigs that had been left to defend the ironworks of Colonel William Hill. After the destruction of the ironworks, Whigs continued to muster, leading to the rise of Thomas Sumter as a significant militia leader, and took their vengeance on Huck in July. A similar gathering of Tories in nearby North Carolina was scattered in the June 20 Battle of Ramsour's Mill.

== Historical relevance ==
Although minor in scope, this engagement and others like it represented important symbolic victories for the Whigs. Mobley's Meeting House and the Battle of Beckhamville were the first two Whig successes against a string of defeats at Charleston, Monck's Corner, Lenud's Ferry, and Waxhaws. Other setbacks at Brandon's Defeat and Hill's ironworks after the Beckhamville and Mobley's Meeting House successes continued to press the Whigs, but rallies at Huck's Defeat (Williamson's Plantation) and Ramsour's Mill provided strategically small victories that provided the moral and spiritual support to keep the Whigs going through these dark days. British victories were to continue at Camden and Fishing Creek only two months later, on 16 and 18 August 1780. Only on 7 October 1780 did a decisive Whig victory at Kings Mountain begin to turn the tide.

== Legacy ==
The location of the meeting house is about 6 miles (9.7 km) west of present-day Winnsboro on the waters of the Little River. A marker has been placed nearby, on SSR 18 at a point approximately 1.5 miles (2 km) west of the site. At one time, there was a road or pathway that went past the meeting house, but it is inaccessible today.

== Sources ==
- Scoggins, Michael C (2005). The Day It Rained Militia: Huck's Defeat and the Revolution in the South Carolina Backcountry, May–July 1780. Charleston, SC: The History Press. ISBN 978-1-59629-015-0. OCLC 60189717.
- Shelton, Kenneth, All That Dare Oppose Them: The Whig Victory at Mobley's Meeting House, June 1780, (2005)
