= The Patriot (2000 film) =

Film by Roland Emmerich

- Theatrical release poster
- Directed by: Roland Emmerich
- Written by: Robert Rodat
- Produced by: Dean Devlin; Mark Gordon; Gary Levinsohn
- Starring: Mel Gibson; Heath Ledger; Gregory Smith; Joely Richardson; Jason Isaacs; Chris Cooper; Tom Wilkinson
- Cinematography: Caleb Deschanel
- Edited by: David Brenner; Julie Monroe
- Music by: John Williams
- Production companies: Columbia Pictures; Centropolis Entertainment; Mutual Film Company
- Distributed by: Sony Pictures Releasing
- Release dates: June 27, 2000 (Century City); June 30, 2000 (United States)
- Running time: 165 minutes
- Country: United States
- Language: English
- Budget: $110 million
- Box office: $215 million

The Patriot is a 2000 American epic historical war film directed by Roland Emmerich and written by Robert Rodat. Starring Mel Gibson, Heath Ledger, Gregory Smith, Joely Richardson, Jason Isaacs, Chris Cooper, and Tom Wilkinson, the film follows Benjamin Martin (Gibson), a widowed American colonist and veteran who is opposed to going to war with Great Britain but, along with his eldest son Gabriel (Ledger), gets swept into the American Revolutionary War after his home life is disrupted by the British Army and his son Thomas (Smith) is murdered by the ruthless Colonel William Tavington (Isaacs).

The Patriot premiered in Century City on June 27, 2000, and was theatrically released in the United States on June 30, 2000. It received mixed-to-positive reviews from critics, with Gibson's performance and the battle sequences being praised. The film was a box office success, grossing $215 million against its $110 million production budget. At the 73rd Academy Awards, it was nominated for Best Cinematography, Best Original Score, and Best Sound, and was nominated for Best Costume Design at the 5th Golden Satellite Awards.

The film generated significant controversy due to various historical inaccuracies, particularly its omission of the enslavement of African Americans and misrepresentation of atrocities committed by American and British soldiers during the war. The portrayal of Benjamin Martin, a composite character based on several historical figures, most notably Francis Marion, was also criticized for whitewashing their wartime conduct. Gibson himself expressed regret for the decision to not portray the character as a slave owner.

== Plot ==
In 1776, during the American Revolutionary War, Benjamin Martin, a French and Indian War veteran and a widower with seven children, is called to Charles Town (Charleston, South Carolina) to vote in the South Carolina General Assembly on a levy supporting the Continental Army. Benjamin abstains, fearing war against Great Britain and not wanting to force others to fight when he himself would not. Still, the vote passes, and Benjamin's oldest son, Gabriel, joins the Continental Army against his father's wishes.

Four years later, in 1780, Charlestown is beseiged by the British Army, and a wounded Gabriel returns home carrying rebel dispatches. The Martins care for wounded British and American soldiers before British dragoons arrive, led by the ruthless Colonel William Tavington. Tavington press gangs the Martins' African-American former slaves into the army and arrests Gabriel as a spy. Gabriel's brother Thomas tries to free him, but Tavington kills Thomas, then orders the Martins' house burned and all the wounded Americans executed. After the British leave, Benjamin and two of his younger sons ambush the British convoy transporting Gabriel. They succeed in killing all the soldiers and rescuing Gabriel, but Benjamin's brutality frightens his sons.

Gabriel rejoins the Continentals, and Benjamin soon follows, leaving the younger children in the care of his sister-in-law, Charlotte. Benjamin meets his former commanding officer, Colonel Harry Burwell, who appoints him as colonel to raise a militia unit and places Gabriel under his father's command. Benjamin is tasked with weakening Lord Cornwallis' regiments through guerrilla warfare. French Major Jean Villeneuve helps train the militia and promises more French aid. Gabriel asks his father why Villeneuve and other militia often mention Fort Wilderness, and Benjamin tells him that while fighting in the British Army, Benjamin and his men discovered atrocities against British colonists by French soldiers in the Blue Ridge Mountains. Enraged, they caught up with the retreating French at Fort Wilderness and mercilessly slaughtered all but two of them. The two survivors had to present the severed heads of their comrades to the Cherokee, which convinced the tribe to betray the French. Though regarded as a hero, Benjamin never forgave himself.

Benjamin's militia ambushes many British patrols and supply caravans, including some of Cornwallis' personal effects and his two Great Danes, and burns bridges and ferries that Cornwallis needs. After Benjamin uses a ruse de guerre to free his captured men, Cornwallis allows Tavington to do everything possible to arrest him.

With the aid of Wilkins, a local Loyalist, Tavington has several militiamen's homes burned and their families executed. Benjamin's family flees Charlotte's plantation to live in a Gullah settlement with formerly enslaved residents. There, Gabriel marries his betrothed, Anne. Tavington's brigade raids Anne's town and assembles everyone in the church, including Anne; knowing that they are secretly aiding the militia, he demands the location of their camp. Despite one townsperson giving it away, Tavington burns the church, killing everyone inside. Upon discovering the tragedy, Gabriel and several other soldiers attack Tavington's encampment, where Tavington is slightly wounded by Gabriel but kills him before fleeing. Benjamin contemplates resignation, but after seeing the American flag Gabriel repaired, he is reminded of his son's patriotic dedication and decides to rejoin the others.

Benjamin devises a battlefield tactic that uses Cornwallis' pride against him. Benjamin's militia joins the Continental Army regiment and confronts Cornwallis' troops in a climactic battle. Benjamin and Tavington engage in personal combat. Tavington wounds Benjamin and prepares to deliver the coup de grâce, but Benjamin dodges the attack and impales Tavington, killing him. The battle becomes a Continental victory, and Cornwallis retreats.

Cornwallis is besieged at Yorktown, where his subordinate surrenders to the American and French forces. Afterwards, Benjamin returns to his family and discovers that his former militia is rebuilding his homestead in honor of Gabriel's dream of building a new world.

== Cast ==
- Mel Gibson as Captain/Colonel Benjamin Martin
  A veteran of the French and Indian War, the hero of the fictional Fort Wilderness, and the widowed father of seven children, he is based on a composite of historical characters including Thomas Sumter, Daniel Morgan, Nathanael Greene, Andrew Pickens, and Francis Marion.
- Heath Ledger as Corporal Gabriel Edward Martin
  Benjamin's eldest son and Anne's betrothed who decides to join up with the Continental Army against his father's wishes (the first born from Martin's children).
- Gregory Smith as Thomas Martin
  Benjamin's second son (the second born from Martin's children).
- Trevor Morgan as Nathan Martin
  Benjamin's third son (the third born from Martin's children).
- Bryan Chafin as Samuel Martin
  Benjamin's fourth son (the fifth born from Martin's children)
- Mika Boorem as Margaret "Meg" Martin
  Benjamin's older daughter (the fourth born from Martin's children).
- Logan Lerman as William Martin
  Benjamin's fifth and youngest son (the sixth born from Martin's children).
- Skye McCole Bartusiak as Susan Martin
  Benjamin's youngest daughter (the seventh and final born from Martin's children).
- Joely Richardson as Charlotte Selton
  Benjamin's sister-in-law and later second wife.
- Jason Isaacs as Colonel William Tavington
  The ruthless leader of the Green Dragoons. The fictionalized character is partly based on British Legion commander Banastre Tarleton.
- Chris Cooper as Colonel Harry Burwell
  One of Benjamin's commanding officers in the French and Indian War and a colonel of the Continental Army. He is based on Lieutenant Colonel Henry "Light Horse Harry" Lee.
- Tcheky Karyo as Major Jean Villeneuve
  A French officer who trains Martin's militia, he holds a grudge against Martin for his part in the French and Indian War, but they become close friends by the war's end. He serves as Martin's second-in-command.
- Rene Auberjonois as Reverend Oliver
  A minister of Pembroke who volunteers to fight with the militia.
- Lisa Brenner as Anne Patricia Howard
  Gabriel's childhood friend, love interest, and later wife.
- Tom Wilkinson as General Charles Cornwallis, 2nd Earl Cornwallis
  A general of the British army.
- Donal Logue as Dan Scott
  One of Benjamin's men who is a racist and bullies the former slave Occam but grows to befriend him.
- Leon Rippy as John Billings
  One of Benjamin's neighbors and oldest friends and former comrade who joins the militia.
- Adam Baldwin as Captain James Wilkins
  An officer in the Loyalist Colonial militia recruited by Captain Bordon.
- Jay Arlen Jones as Occam
  A black slave who is forced to fight in his master's place.
- Joey D. Vieira as Peter Howard
  Anne's father. A French-Indian war veteran who suffered hearing-loss and has a prosthetic leg. He helps fund Martin's militia.
- Peter Woodward as Brigadier General Charles O'Hara
  Cornwallis' second in-command.
- Jamieson K. Price as Captain Bordon
  Tavington's second in-command.
- Zach Hanner as British field officer
- Terry Layman as General George Washington
- Andy Stahl as General Nathanael Greene
- Grahame Wood as a British lieutenant

== Production ==
=== Script ===
Screenwriter Robert Rodat wrote seventeen drafts of the script before there was an acceptable one. In an early version, Anne is pregnant with Gabriel's child when she dies in the burning church. Rodat wrote the script with Mel Gibson in mind for Benjamin Martin and gave the character six children to signal that preference to studio executives. After the birth of Gibson's seventh child, the script was changed so that Martin has seven children. Like the character William Wallace, which Gibson had portrayed in Braveheart five years earlier, Martin wants to live in peace until the murder of an innocent family member drives him to seek revenge on the British.

=== Casting ===
Harrison Ford turned down the lead role of Benjamin Martin because he considered the film "too violent" and that "it boiled the American Revolution down to one guy wanting revenge." Gibson was paid a record salary of $25 million. Jude Law was offered the role of William Tavington, but turned it down, the role eventually went to Jason Isaacs after submitting an audition tape. Joshua Jackson, Elijah Wood, Jake Gyllenhaal, and Brad Renfro were considered to play Gabriel Martin. The producers and director narrowed their choices for the role of Gabriel to Ryan Phillippe and Heath Ledger, with Ledger chosen because Roland Emmerich thought he possessed "exuberant youth."

=== Filming ===
The film's German director Emmerich said "these were characters I could relate to, and they were engaged in a conflict that had a significant outcome—the creation of the first modern democratic government."

The film was shot entirely on location in South Carolina, including Charleston, Rock Hill—for many of the battle scenes, and Lowrys—for the farm of Benjamin Martin, as well as nearby Fort Lawn. Filming began on September 7, 1999, and ended on January 20, 2000. Other scenes were filmed at Mansfield Plantation, an antebellum rice plantation in Georgetown, Middleton Place in Charleston, South Carolina, at the Cistern Yard on the campus of College of Charleston, and Hightower Hall and Homestead House at Brattonsville, South Carolina, along with the grounds of the Brattonsville Plantation in McConnells, South Carolina. Producer Mark Gordon said the production team "tried their best to be as authentic as possible" because "the backdrop was serious history," giving attention to details in period dress. Producer Dean Devlin and the film's costume designers examined actual Revolutionary War uniforms at the Smithsonian Institution prior to shooting.

=== Musical score ===
The musical score for The Patriot was composed and conducted by John Williams and was nominated for an Academy Award. David Arnold, who composed the scores to Emmerich's Stargate, Independence Day, and Godzilla, created a demo for The Patriot that was ultimately rejected. As a result, Arnold never returned to compose for any of Emmerich's subsequent films and was replaced by Harald Kloser and Thomas Wander.

== Release ==
=== Premiere ===
The film had its world premiere in Century City on June 27, 2000, and was theatrically released in the United States on June 30, 2000, by Sony Pictures Releasing.

=== Home media ===
The Patriot was released on DVD and VHS on October 24, 2000, a Blu-ray release followed on July 3, 2007. The film was later released on 4K UHD Blu-ray on May 22, 2018.

== Reception ==
=== Critical response ===
On Rotten Tomatoes, The Patriot holds an approval rating of 61% based on 140 reviews. The site's critics consensus reads: "The Patriot can be entertaining to watch, but it relies too much on formula and melodrama." On Metacritic, the film has a weighted average score of 63 out of 100, based on 35 critics, indicating "generally favorable reviews". Audiences surveyed by CinemaScore gave the film an average grade "A" on an A+ to F scale.

The New York Times critic Elvis Mitchell gave the film a generally negative review, although he praised its casting and called Mel Gibson "an astonishing actor", particularly for his "on-screen comfort and expansiveness". He said the film is a "gruesome hybrid, a mix of sentimentality and brutality". Jamie Malanowski, also writing in The New York Times, said The Patriot "will prove to many a satisfying way to spend a summer evening. It's got big battles and wrenching hand-to-hand combat, a courageous but conflicted hero and a dastardly and totally guilt-free villain, thrills, tenderness, sorrow, rage and a little bit of kissing". In his review of the film, the critic Roger Ebert wrote, "I enjoyed the strength and conviction of Gibson's performance, the sweep of the battle scenes, and the absurdity of the British caricatures. None of it has much to do with the historical reality of the Revolutionary War, but with such an enormous budget at risk, how could it?"

=== False reviews controversy ===
A highly positive review was purportedly written by a critic named David Manning, who was credited to The Ridgefield Press, a small Connecticut weekly news publication. During an investigation into Manning's quotes, Newsweek reporter John Horn discovered that the newspaper had never heard of him. The story emerged at around the same time as an announcement that Sony had used employees posing as moviegoers in television commercials to praise the film. All of those occurrences raised questions and controversies about ethics in film promotion practices.

On the June 10, 2001 episode of Le Show, host Harry Shearer conducted an in-studio interview with Manning, whose "review" of the film was positive. The voice of Manning was provided by a computer voice synthesizer.

On August 3, 2005, Sony made an out-of-court settlement and agreed to refund $5 each to dissatisfied customers who saw that and four other films in American theaters as a result of Manning's reviews.

=== Box office ===
The Patriot opened in 3,061 venues at No. 2 with $22,413,710 domestically in its opening weekend, falling slightly short of expectations (predictions had the film opening #1 with roughly $25 million ahead). The film opened behind Warner Bros.'s The Perfect Storm, which opened at No. 1 with $41,325,042. In the United Kingdom, it opened at No. 3 behind Chicken Run and Mission: Impossible 2, earning $1.5 million in its first weekend. It also ranked No. 2 behind Dinosaur in South Korea, making an opening weekend gross of $759,000. The film closed on October 16, 2000, with a domestic total of $113,330,342. It saw a similar level of success in foreign markets, earning $101,964,000 there for a grand total of $215,294,342, against a production budget of $110 million.

=== Accolades ===
The Patriot was nominated for three Academy Awards: Best Cinematography, Best Original Score, and Best Sound (Kevin O'Connell, Greg P. Russell and Lee Orloff). It also received several guild awards, including the American Society of Cinematographers award to Caleb Deschanel for Outstanding Achievement in Cinematography and the Hollywood Makeup Artist and Hair Stylist Guild Award for Best Period Makeup and Best Period Hair Styling.

=== Strictures ===
In the introduction to his book about the American Revolutionary War, Hugh Bicheno wrote of the irritation to himself and historian Richard Holmes, who presented the companion televised series, "... not so much with the banal stereotyping of the film The Patriot (2000) as by the tiresome argument that it was 'just entertainment'."

Bicheno compares it with its artistic template, Sergei Eisenstein's film Alexander Nevsky, "... both being works of contemporary propaganda thinly disguised as historical drama. But the similarities end there, for the very existence of Eisenstein's Russia was under imminent threat by the Teutonic enemy Nevsky defeated, hardly the case of the United States vis-à-vis today's Britain."

In an assessment of war movies, military historian Antony Beevor quotes journalist Andrew Marr:

[It is] hard to forget The Patriot, starring Mel Gibson, that fearless symbol of Brit-bashing films, whether at Gallipoli or all woaded up in the Scottish Highlands as Braveheart. Andrew Marr rightly called The Patriot, set in the American war of independence, “a stinker”. As he pointed out: “Black Americans, in fact destined to stay slaves thanks to the war, very many of whom enlisted with the British, are shown fighting shoulder to shoulder with their white rebel ‘brothers’. The British are portrayed as effete sadists and serial war criminals, just as in other American films. The huge support of the Bourbon French, who helped win the war, is airbrushed out. And the fact that most colonists actually sided with King George is airily forgotten.”

== Historical authenticity ==
During development, Emmerich and his team consulted experts at the Smithsonian Institution on set, props, and costumes; advisor Rex Ellis even recommended the Gullah village as an appropriate place for Martin's family to hide. In addition, screenwriter Robert Rodat read through many journals and letters of colonists as part of his preparation for writing the screenplay.

Producer Mark Gordon said that in making the film, "while we were telling a fictional story, the backdrop was serious history". Some of the resulting characters and events thus were composites of real characters and events that were designed to serve the fictional narrative without losing the historical flavor. Rodat said of Gibson's character: "Benjamin Martin is a composite character made up of Thomas Sumter, Daniel Morgan, Andrew Pickens, and Francis Marion, and a few bits and pieces from a number of other characters." Rodat also indicated that the fictional Colonel William Tavington is "loosely based on Colonel Banastre Tarleton, who was particularly known for his brutal acts".

While some events, such as Tarleton's pursuit of Francis Marion and his fellow irregular soldiers who escaped by disappearing into the swamps of South Carolina, were loosely based on history, and others were adapted, such as the final battle in the film which combined elements of the Battles of Cowpens and Battle of Guilford Court House, most of the plot events in the film are pure fiction. Gibson himself referred to it as "sheer fantasy" at the time of release.

A December 2000 review in The Journal of American History reads "This film is a well-told, well-acted, and handsomely photographed historical epic.... However, much of The Patriot is not historically accurate in the interpretation of broad themes or in specific details of the campaign in the South and of warfare in the American Revolution." In 2011, Time ranked The Patriot in a list of the "Top 10 Historically Misleading Films."

=== Criticism of Benjamin Martin as based on Francis Marion ===
The film was harshly criticized in the British press in part because of its connection to Francis Marion, a militia leader in South Carolina known as the "Swamp Fox". After the release of The Patriot, the British newspaper The Guardian denounced Marion as "a serial rapist who hunted Red Indians for fun." Historian Christopher Hibbert told the Daily Express about Marion:

The truth is that people like Marion committed atrocities as bad, if not worse, than those perpetrated by the British.

The Patriot does not depict the American character Benjamin Martin as innocent of atrocities; a key plot point revolves around the character's guilt over acts he engaged in, such as torturing, killing, and mutilating prisoners during the French and Indian War, leading him to repentantly repudiate General Cornwallis for the brutality of his men.

Conservative radio host Michael Graham rejected Hibbert's criticism of Marion in a commentary published in National Review:

Was Francis Marion a slave owner? Was he a determined and dangerous warrior? Did he commit acts in an 18th century war that we would consider atrocious in the current world of peace and political correctness? As another great American film hero might say: 'You're damn right.' "That's what made him a hero, 200 years ago and today."

Graham also refers to what he describes as "the unchallenged work of South Carolina's premier historian" Dr. Walter Edgar, who claimed in his 1998 South Carolina: A History that Marion's partisans were "a ragged band of both black and white volunteers".

Amy Crawford, in Smithsonian magazine, stated that modern historians such as William Gilmore Simms and Hugh Rankin have written accurate biographies of Marion, including Simms' The Life of Francis Marion. The introduction to the 2007 edition of Simms' book was written by Sean Busick, a professor of American history at Athens State University in Alabama, who wrote:

Marion deserves to be remembered as one of the heroes of the War for Independence....Francis Marion was a man of his times: he owned slaves, and he fought in a brutal campaign against the Cherokee Indians...Marion's experience in the French and Indian War prepared him for more admirable service.

During pre-production, the producers debated on whether Martin would own slaves, ultimately deciding not to make him a slave owner but an employer of freemen-of-color. The Journal of American History wrote that such an arrangement was historically implausible, calling it "probably the only such labor arrangement in colonial South Carolina." This decision received criticism from Spike Lee, who in a letter to The Hollywood Reporter accused the film's portrayal of slavery as being "a complete whitewashing of history". Lee wrote that after he and his wife went to see the film, "we both came out of the theatre fuming. For three hours The Patriot dodged around, skirted about or completely ignored slavery." Gibson himself remarked in 2006: "I think I would have made him a slave holder. Not to seems kind of a cop-out."

=== Criticism of Tavington as based on Tarleton ===
After release, several British voices criticized the film for its depiction of the film's villain Tavington and defended the historical character of Banastre Tarleton. Ben Fenton, commenting in The Daily Telegraph, wrote:

There is no evidence that Tarleton, called 'Bloody Ban' or 'The Butcher' in rebel pamphlets, ever broke the rules of war and certainly did not ever shoot a child in cold blood.

Although Tarleton gained the reputation among Americans as a butcher for his involvement in the Battle of Waxhaws in South Carolina, he was a hero in the City of Liverpool. Liverpool City Council, led by Mayor Edwin Clein, called for a public apology for what they viewed as the film's "character assassination" of Tarleton.

Whereas Tavington is depicted as aristocratic but penniless, Tarleton came from a wealthy Liverpool merchant family. Tarleton did not die in battle or from impalement, as Tavington did in the film. Tarleton died on January 16, 1833, in Leintwardine, Herefordshire, England, at the age of 78, nearly 50 years after the war ended. He outlived Col. Francis Marion, who died in 1795, by 38 years. Before his death, Tarleton had achieved the military rank of General, equal to that held by the overall British commanders during the American Revolution, and became a baronet and a member of the British Parliament.

=== Depiction of atrocities in the Revolutionary War ===
The Patriot was criticized for misrepresenting atrocities during the Revolutionary War, including the killing of prisoners of war and wounded soldiers and Tavington's burning a church filled with civilians. Although historians have noted that both sides during the conflict committed atrocities, they "generally agree that the rebels probably violated the rules of war more often than the British". According to Salon.com, the church-burning scene in the film is based on the Oradour-sur-Glane massacre committed by German forces in 1944, though "[there] is no evidence that a similar event took place during the American Revolution". Historian Bill Segars noted that there was no record of the British ever burning a church full of civilians during the Revolutionary War, though British and Loyalist forces did burn several empty churches such as the St. Philip's Church in Brunswick Town and Indiantown Presbyterian Church.

The New York Post film critic Jonathan Foreman was one of several focusing on this distortion in the film and wrote the following in an article at Salon.com:

The most disturbing thing about The Patriot is not just that German director Roland Emmerich (director of Independence Day) and his screenwriter Robert Rodat (who was criticized for excluding the roles played by British and other Allied troops in the Normandy landings from his script for Saving Private Ryan) depicted British troops as committing savage atrocities, but that those atrocities bear such a close resemblance to war crimes carried out by German troops—particularly the SS in World War II. It's hard not to wonder if the filmmakers have some kind of subconscious agenda... They have made a film that will have the effect of inoculating audiences against the unique historical horror of Oradour—and implicitly rehabilitating the Nazis while making the British seem as evil as history's worst monsters... So it's no wonder that the British press sees this film as a kind of blood libel against the British people.

The Washington Post film critic Stephen Hunter said: "Any image of the American Revolution which represents you Brits as Nazis and us as gentle folk is almost certainly wrong. It was a very bitter war, a total war, and that is something that I am afraid has been lost to history....[T]he presence of the Loyalists (colonists who did not want to join the fight for independence from Britain) meant that the War of Independence was a conflict of complex loyalties." The historian Richard F. Snow, editor of American Heritage magazine, said of the church-burning scene: "Of course it never happened—if it had do you think Americans would have forgotten it? It could have kept us out of World War I."

=== Role of African Americans in the Revolutionary War ===
The character Occam (played by Jay Arlen Jones) is an enslaved African American man who fights in the war in place of his master, and is freed after a year's service via a general order of the Continental Army, while continuing to serve with the militia until the end of the war. Historically, no such order existed. While Black Patriots constituted a sizable portion of the Patriot forces, enslaved servicemen were not entitled to emancipation, and many were returned or re-sold to their masters at the war's end, while those applying for pensions were mostly denied. At least one Black Patriot soldier, James Roberts, expressed regret for his Revolutionary War service.

Conversely, the Dunmore's Proclamation in November 1775 offered emancipation to all slaves and indentured servants who volunteered to join British forces, coming to be known as Black Loyalists. The 1779 Philipsburg Proclamation de facto freed all slaves owned by American Patriots throughout the rebel states, and resulted in a significant number of runaways. According to historian Cassandra Pybus, approximately 20,000 attempted to leave their owners and join the British over the course of the entire war. At the end of the war, the British relocated several thousand free Black Loyalists to Nova Scotia and Sierra Leone, while the Treaty of Paris (1783) regarded all runaways as American property entitled to re-enslavement.

=== Omission of Loyalists from the British forces ===
The Journal of American History criticized the film for its omission of Loyalists in the British forces, when they represented a significant portion of that side's manpower. In particular, the film's fictionalized depiction of the British Legion (the historical Tarleton's unit) is portrayed as nearly uniformly-British.

"A significant segment of the population of the Carolinas and Georgia remained loyal, and much of the fighting there was a civil war between Tories and Whigs. Though Loyalist provincial and militia units constituted one-half of the British army in the South, the film portrays only one Loyalist soldier, Captain Wilkins (Adam Baldwin) in Colonel Tavington's (Jason Isaacs) dragoons....The film gives the impression that Tavington's regiment is British and that Captain Wilkins is the only Loyalist in its ranks. No other Loyalist soldiers appear in The Patriot."

== See also ==
- List of films about the American Revolution
- List of television series and miniseries about the American Revolution
