= Battle of Rocky Mount =

1780 battle of the American Revolutionary War

Coordinates: 34°32′23.51″N 80°52′33.39″W

- Part of the American Revolutionary War
Date	July 31 or August 1, 1780
Location	near present-day Great Falls, South Carolina
Result	British victory

Belligerents
United States	Great Britain

Commanders and leaders
(United States) Thomas Sumter	(Kingdom of Great Britain) George Turnbull

Strength
300 militia	600 militia

Casualties and losses
12 killed and wounded	20 killed and wounded

The Battle of Rocky Mount took place on August 1, 1780, as part of the American Revolutionary War. 600 Loyalists commanded by Lieutenant Colonel George Turnbull occupying an outpost in northern South Carolina withstood an attack by 300 American Patriots led by Colonel Thomas Sumter.

== Background ==
Throughout 1779 and early 1780, the British "southern strategy" to regain control of its rebellious provinces in the American Revolutionary War went well, with successful amphibious operations against Savannah, Georgia and Charleston, South Carolina, and a routing of the few remaining Continental Army troops in South Carolina in the May 29, 1780 Battle of Waxhaws. The British, in complete control of both South Carolina and Georgia, established outposts in the interior of both states to recruit Loyalists and to suppress Patriot dissent.

One of these outposts was established at Rocky Mount, near the confluence of Rocky Creek and the Catawba River, south of present-day Great Falls, South Carolina. This outpost was garrisoned by a regiment of New York Volunteers under the command of Lieutenant Colonel George Turnbull.

== Patriot militia regroup ==
In the absence of Continental Army command structure to organize resistance to the British following the disaster at Waxhaws, companies began to grow around Patriot militia leaders who had either survived it, or were not present at the battle. One militia colonel, Thomas Sumter, began in June 1780 to accumulate a militia force near Salisbury with financial assistance from North Carolina officials. While his force was too small to effectively oppose large-scale British and Loyalist activity for a time, enlistments rose following the Patriot victory known as Huck's Defeat on July 12. By late July he had several hundred men and decided it was time to take action.

His primary target to attack was the British outpost at Rocky Mount. Sumter had learned on July 20 from a spy that the defenses might be susceptible to small arms fire, a clear benefit since Sumter lacked any sort of field artillery. (To Sumter's detriment, the spy was probably a double agent, and Turnbull shortly thereafter began strengthening Rocky Mount's defenses until they were proof against musketry.)

On July 28, Sumter broke camp and moved his company, numbering about 600 men, down to Land's Ford, a major crossing point of the Catawba. There he met Major William Davie, who was leading a company of dragoons, and additional smaller militia companies. They decided that Davie would lead a diversionary attack against another outpost while Sumter would assault Rocky Mount.

== Battle ==
The action began early on July 30. (Sources disagree on when Sumter arrived at Rocky Mount, but Davie's action appears to have taken place on July 31.) Davie and his dragoons rode to the British outpost at Hanging Rock (south of present-day Heath Springs, South Carolina), where they surprised a company of Loyalists camped outside the fortifications, inflicting casualties and seizing 60 horses. The action happened so quickly that the British forces inside the fortifications were unable to respond.

Sumter's attack went less well. Turnbull's work on the defenses at Rocky Mount paid off, and Sumter's men were unable to penetrate the defenses. After several hours of fruitless battle, they tried setting fire to the works, but this was frustrated by a torrential downpour that ended the battle.

== Aftermath ==
Sumter's forces suffered relatively modest casualties, and Sumter went on to successfully attack Hanging Rock a few days later.

== See also ==
- American Revolutionary War § War in the South. Places ' Battle of Rocky Mount ' in overall sequence and strategic context.
