= Christian Huck =

Loyalist soldier in American Revolutionary War

- Born: 1747 or 1748; A German State
- Died: July 12, 1780 (aged 31–32); York, South Carolina
- Occupation: Lawyer
- Known for: Loyalist officer during the Revolutionary War

Christian Huck (1747 or 1748 – July 12, 1780), a Loyalist soldier from Philadelphia during the American Revolutionary War, was known for Huck's Defeat.

== Before the war ==
Christian Huck was born in a German State of Europe in about 1747 or 1748. Huck immigrated to the American colonies and read law under Isaac Hunt, a lawyer and satirist. Huck immigrated to Philadelphia, Pennsylvania in 1772. He practiced law in Philadelphia by 1775 and he was a real estate investor. As a wealthy, German Anglican, Christian Huck became a member of Philadelphia's upper society, many of whom were loyal to The Crown.

== The revolution begins ==
Huck, a Loyalist, Isaac Hunt, were subject to harassment by Patriots. Hunt was paraded through town and forced to admit and acknowledge his "misbehavior."

Huck stood by fellow loyalists and assisted the British Army who occupied Philadelphia in September 1777. In 1778, the Pennsylvania Supreme Court published a list titled "A Proclamation, by the Supreme Executive Council of the Common Wealth of Pennsylvania." Huck was among the people charged with willingly aiding the British and if he didn't give up all of his property by a prescribed day, he would be considered to have committed High Treason and subject to all applicable. "pains and penalties".

== Military career ==
At age 30, Huck joined the British Army in New York, by June 1778. Made a captain in Provincial corps, he assembled a company of thirty men, most of whom where of German heritage. New recruits increased the ranks by "two troops of light dragoons, one infantry company, one rifle company, and three chasseur companies, including Hucks."

Due to tensions within the corps between American and the British born members, the corps was split and one light dragoon troop was given to Huck to attach to (but not incorporated into) the British Legion under Lieutenant Colonel Banastre Tarleton. However the "attachment vs. incorporation" order had been apparently discarded by 1779's end as Huck's troops were routinely referred to as "of the Legion." In May 1780, Huck participated in the infamous Battle of Waxhaws, led by Tarleton. He was also involved in the destruction of Hill's Ironworks, an important Patriot supplier as well as headquarters for Hill's Militia.

By July 1780, Huck had gained a reputation for swearing, being particularly hard on Presbyterians, and being cruel and destructive. Cornwallis charged him for recruiting supporters for the Loyalists. In one instance, Huck ordered Martha Bratton (wife of Colonel William Bratton, and ardent Whig) to betray her husband's location and when refused she was threatened with a reaping-hook. Another officer spared her.

== Huck's Defeat ==
Huck was ordered by British Colonel George Turnbull of the Royal New York Volunteers and the commander of the Rocky Mount, South Carolina military post to scout for activity by the patriots. Huck went to the Williamson Plantation in York County, South Carolina. After capturing five Whig supporters at the plantation in the corncrib, Huck and his other officers stayed in the main house while the 115 to 120 men of his force set up camp in the surrounding areas. Believing that since they met no obstacle in overtaking the plantation they were safe, there was little to no guard posted. In the meantime, Martha Bratton had sent a loyal slave named Watt to her husband (who was currently camped on Fishing Creek) to tell him where Huck was camped while a crippled spy named Joseph Kerr found Colonel William Bratton as well. Combining Kerr and Watt's intelligence the attack on Huck's men was planned by Bratton and Captain John McClure, who was also with him.

All of Thomas Sumter's command — Captain James McClure and Colonels Andrew Neel, William Hill, Edward Lacey, and William Bratton — went to the Williamson's Plantation encampment of Huck and his troops. The patriots surrounded the encampment at daybreak on July 12, 1780. There were 140 to 250 rebels in the attack. Huck was shot from his horse and most of Huck's forces had run into the woods. Approximately 85 percent of Huck's troops were killed, wounded, or captured in the short battle while the Americans had one casualty and another wounded. Huck was buried on the spot and his body later used as a medical skeleton.

According to Banastre Tarleton, the legacy that Christian Huck left behind was not one of Loyalist bravery, but of the "disgrace and defeat" that comes from neglect of proper duty which had caused his death.

== Bibliography ==
- Scoggins, Michael C. (2005). The Day It Rained Militia: Huck's Defeat and the Revolution in the South Carolina Backcountry, May–July 1780. Charleston, South Carolina: History Press.
- Walker, Melissa (2013). The Battles of Kings Mountain and Cowpens: The American Revolution in the Southern Backcountry. New York, New York: Routledge.
