= Brattonsville Historic District =

Historic district in South Carolina, United States

- U.S. National Register of Historic Places
- U.S. Historic district
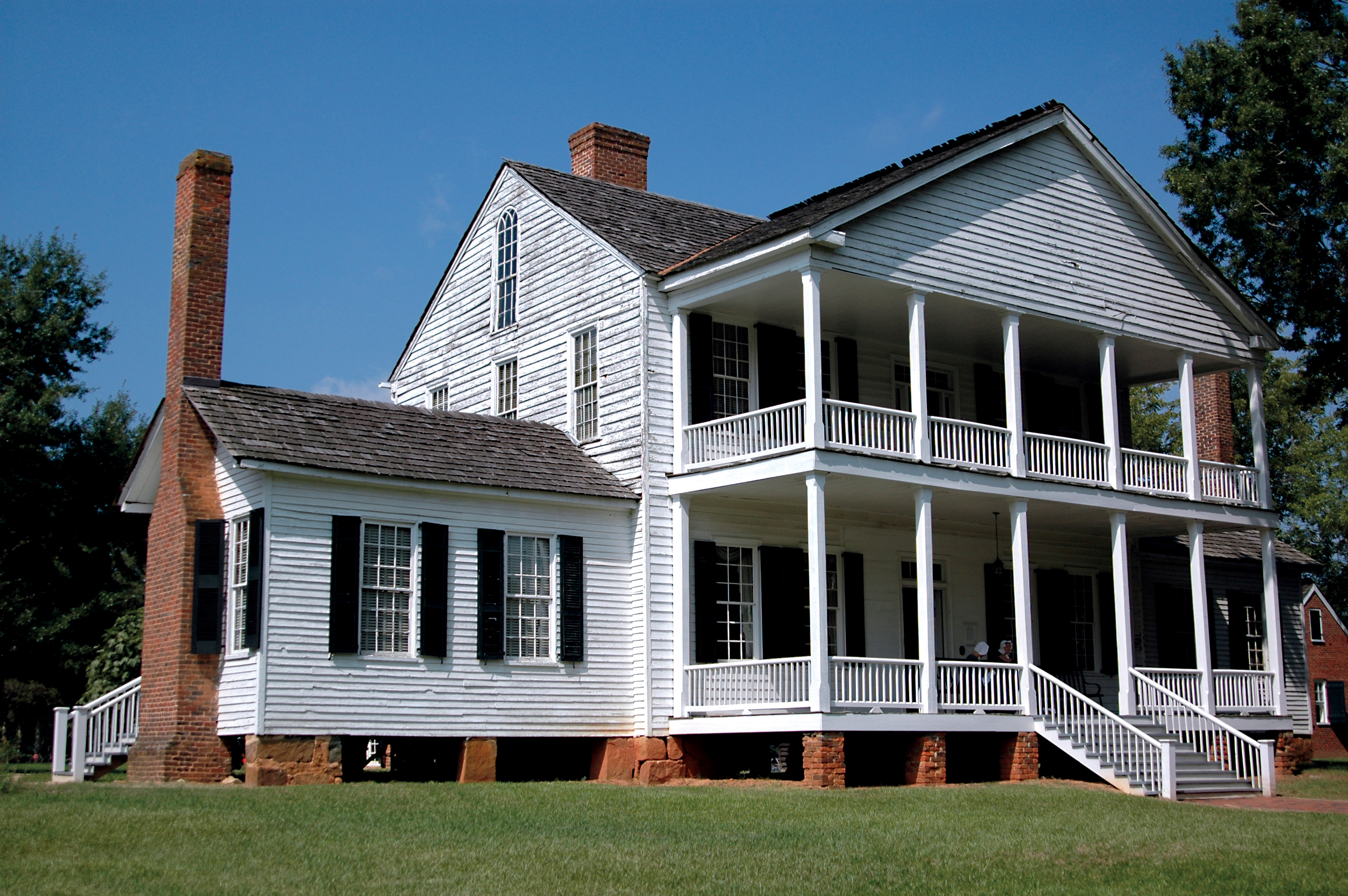
- Main house

- Location within South Carolina Location within the United States
- Nearest city: McConnells, South Carolina
- Coordinates: 34°52′4″N 81°10′39″W
- Area: 6,760 acres (2,740 ha)
- Architect: Col. William Bratton
- Architectural style: Georgian
- NRHP reference No.: 71000812, 97001205
- Added to NRHP: August 19, 1971

The Brattonsville Historic District is a historic district and unincorporated community in York County, South Carolina. It includes three homes built between 1776 and 1855 by the Brattons (William Bratton and Martha Bratton), a prominent family of York County. It was named to the National Register of Historic Places in 1971.

== Contributing properties ==
The Revolutionary House, built in 1776 by Colonel William Bratton (who fought in the Revolutionary War), was originally a one-room log house with a small porch. Later additions were added to the original structure, and clapboard siding was placed over the original logs.

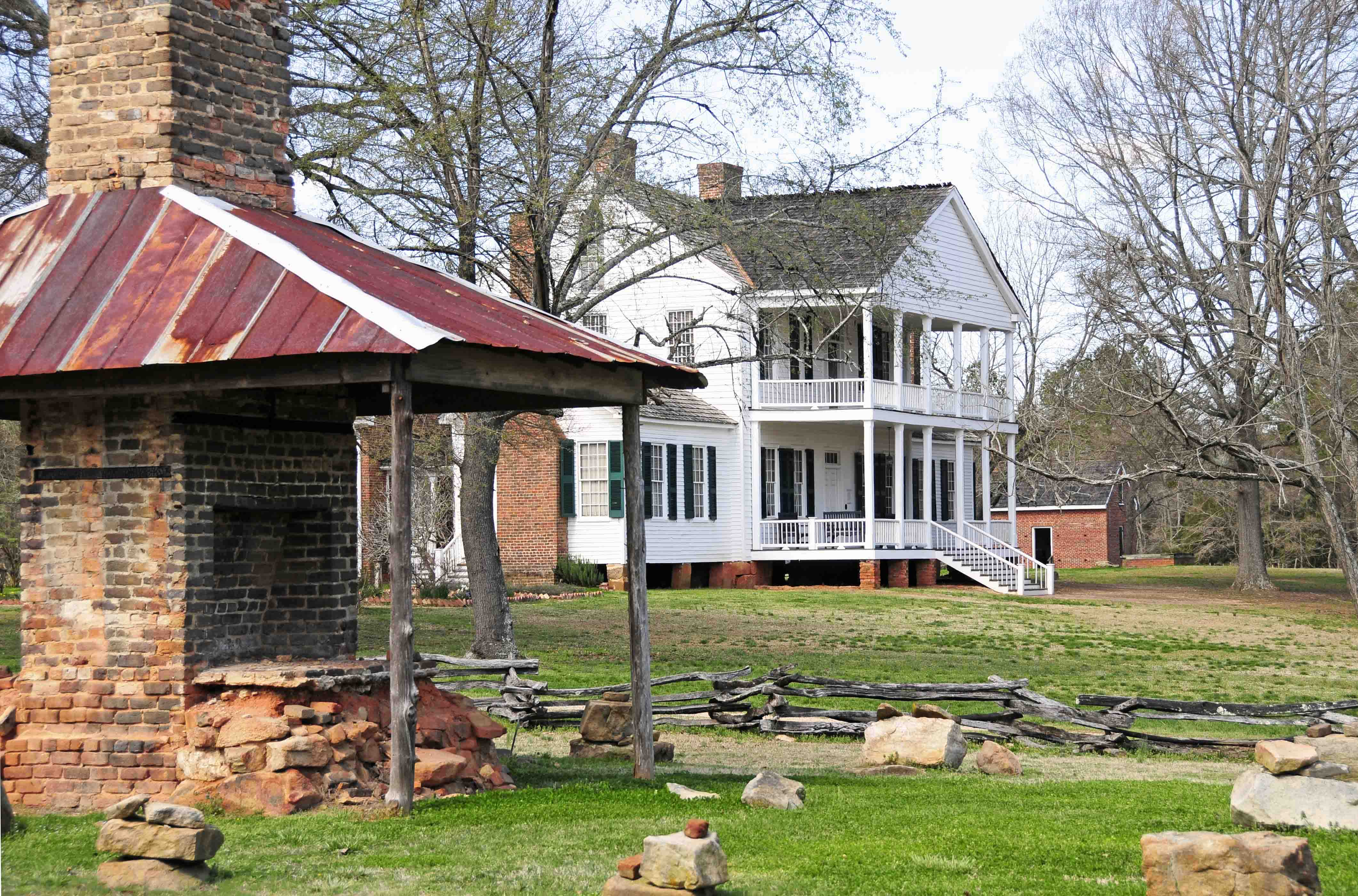
Brattonsville Historic District

The Homestead, Brattonsville's second house built about 1830 as the home of Dr. John S. Bratton, was significant as the center of an 8500-acre plantation. This 12-room, 2 1/8-story antebellum mansion is an example of Greek Revival residential architecture. The interior features Adam mantels, exquisite dadoes, and a carved staircase.

The Brick House, built in 1855, has a two-story brick façade with end chimneys, a two-tiered portico, stucco-over-brick columns, and a two-story wooden wing at back; it was originally a private boarding school for girls.

The district was listed on the National Register of Historic Places on August 19, 1971. In 1997, the district's boundary was increased to comprise 6760 acres, 24 buildings, 12 structures, and 1 object.

A short way down the road is the antebellum Sutton House, the household of an adjoining large cotton plantation.

== Historic Brattonsville ==
Historic Brattonsville is the 775-acre (314 ha) portion of the Brattonsville Historic District that is owned by the York County Culture and Heritage Commission and Dr. Rufus Bratton, and operates as an open-air museum. Buildings include Hightower Hall, The Homestead, and the McConnell House (moved to the site in 1983).

During Reconstruction, Brattonsville was associated with the murder of James "Jim" Williams, a formerly enslaved African American who had worked for the Bratton family and subsequently served in the Union Army. Following the Civil War, Williams became a local civil rights leader and, in 1869, was appointed captain of a South Carolina state militia company composed of African American men. On March 7, 1871, members of the Ku Klux Klan, led by Dr. J. Rufus Bratton, abducted and lynched Williams near his home, approximately 1.5 miles (2.4 km) from Brattonsville. Williams's body was taken to the Brick House, which then housed the Brattonsville general store, for a coroner's inquest. In 2021, the restored building opened an exhibition entitled Liberty & Resistance: Reconstruction and the African American Community at Brattonsville, 1865–1877, examining Williams's life and the experiences of African Americans in York County during Reconstruction.

== In popular culture ==
The Brattonsville Historic District served as the location for several scenes in the 2000 Revolutionary War epic film The Patriot. Portions of the Homestead House, including its east façade and porch, were used in scenes depicting Charlotte Selton's (played by Joely Richardson) rural plantation. The Continental Encampment, interior scenes of the Howard family's home, and the plantation at Camden were also filmed on site.

== Notable residents ==
- J. Rufus Bratton, physician and inspiration for the main character in The Clansman and The Birth of a Nation
