= Grahame Wood =

British–American actor (born 1970)

- Born: 1970 (age 55–56); Toronto, Ontario, Canada
- Occupations: Writer, producer, actor
- Years active: 1986 – present

Grahame Wood (born 1970) is a British–American actor born in Toronto Canada. His career has kept him busy in L.A., London, Toronto, and Vancouver. He is best known for his performance in the Roland Emmerich epic, The Patriot, and continues to forge a career out of playing the layered bad guy. Commenting on his death scene in Saving Private Ryan, Steven Spielberg proclaimed, "That was better than the opening credits of ER!"

== Film/Television ==
Wood trained at Britain at LAMDA. His work includes both the The Patriot and Saving Private Ryan, Wood appeared in the Emmy Award-nominated movie, 4 Minutes, where he portrayed runner Sir Christopher Chataway. He played the role of Gordon on the ABC Family series, Falcon Beach, and has guest-starred on numerous television series. Wood has spent the past two decades working in the film and television industries of the U.S., Canada and UK – playing both Americans and Brits – as well as writing and producing.

Wood was executive producer of the rock doc, Saturday Night at Morley Gibson's. He produced and wrote The Angel Chronicles, in development with Insight Productions and CTV from 2008 to 2011. He is currently in development on the cop drama, Moon Rising, with Devilishly Good Productions in L.A.

== Novels ==
Wood has written a series of thriller novels about an RCMP constable, Darkly Stewart. Negotiations for printing and television adaptations are currently underway.

== Links to film and television credits ==
- Grahame Wood at IMDb
