= Bethesda Presbyterian Church (McConnells, South Carolina) =

Historic church in South Carolina, United States

- U.S. National Register of Historic Places
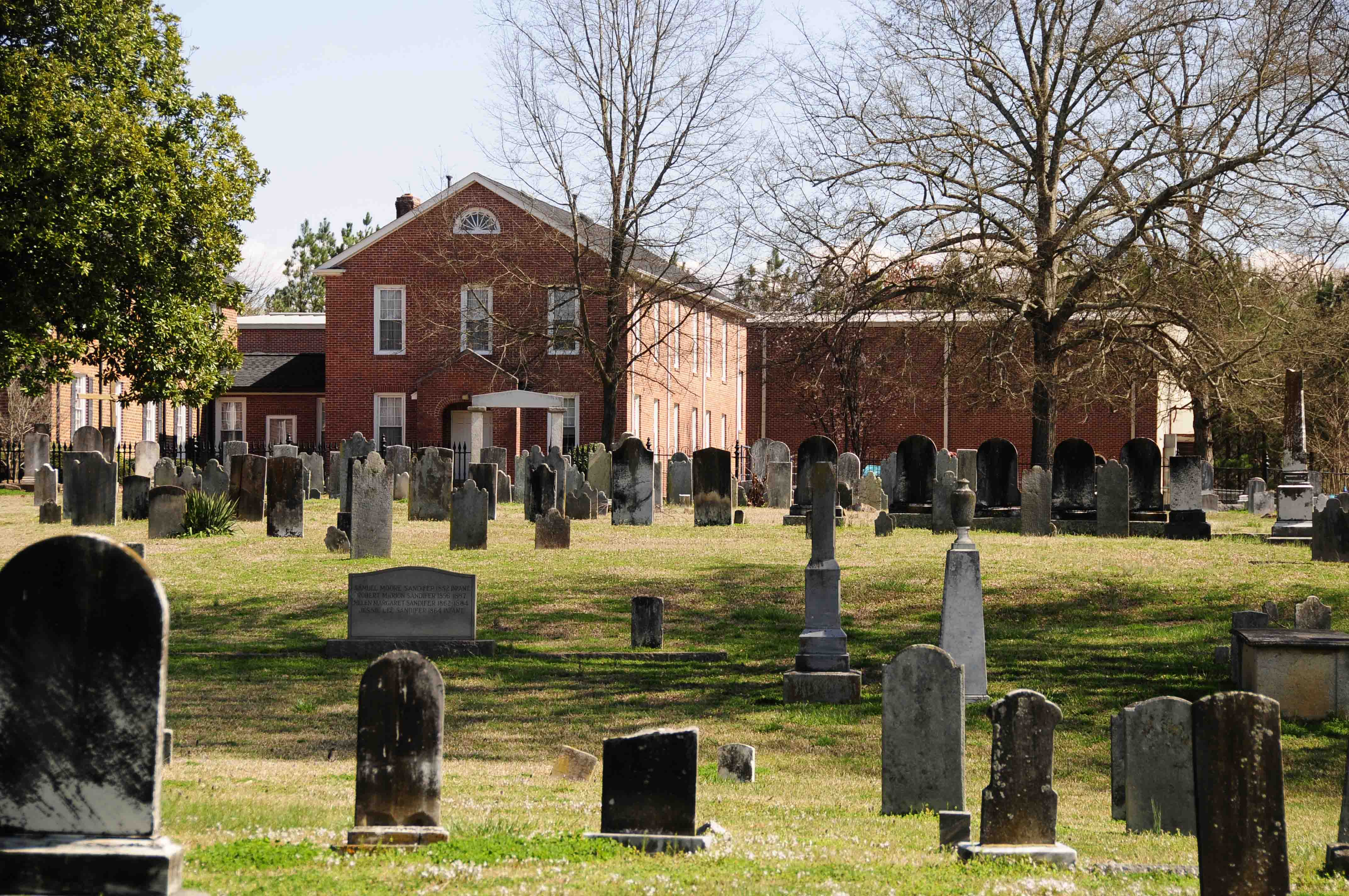

- Location within South Carolina Location within the United States
- Nearest city: McConnells, South Carolina
- Coordinates: 34°53′52″N 81°10′32″W
- Area: 6 acres (2.4 ha)
- Built: 1820
- NRHP reference No.: 77001233
- Added to NRHP: August 16, 1977

Bethesda Presbyterian Church is a church in McConnells, South Carolina that was built in 1820. It was listed on the National Register of Historic Places in 1977. It was named to the National Register of Historic Places in 1977.

According to the South Carolina Department of Archives and History, "One of the oldest churches in the South Carolina Upcountry, Bethesda Presbyterian Church is also one of the four original Presbyterian churches in the state’s old York District. A mission (church) is believed to have existed as early as 1760 and Bethesda was formally organized about 1769 or 1770. From 1800 to 1863, the congregation held large camp meetings associated with the Second Great Awakening."

== See also ==
- Bethesda Presbyterian Church (Camden, South Carolina)
