= James Waylen =

19th-century English painter

"Colonel George Turnbull and sergeant play a strathspey, 1770, New York", 26x32 inches, 1884. The text below includes the Colonel with a favorite sergeant, the solatium [compensation] of a strathspey after a weary day's work. The prostration of the regimental dog indicates the severity of the march, while the approach of the whisky induces the sergeant to beat time with encreased [stet] emphasis.

James Waylen (19 April 1810–1894) was a 19th-century English painter. He was already successful as an artist in his 20s, when he exhibited two portraits and a work entitled Marmion Borne Down by the Scottish Spearmen at Flodden at the Royal Academy of Arts in London from 1834 to 1838.

== Biography ==
He was born in Devizes, Wiltshire, in southern England on 19 April 1810 of Robert and Sarah Waylen. On 2 June 1829 Waylen came to the office of the famous civil engineer Thomas Telford, designing London's St Katharine Docks.

Working in Telford's drawing office, he made long-life friends with another civil engineer, the Scottish George Turnbull, who in 1838 asked Waylen to travel from London to Huntingtower near Perth in Scotland to paint a portrait in oils of Turnbull's father William Turnbull, who wrote to his son:

Waylen seems just the same unassuming, kindhearted creature as when last here: his heart appears to be in his profession, and he has made more progress in it than could have been expected in the time; we find him very amusing in the accounts of his travels. He has been here more than a week and has made a success in making a likeness of me: everyone who sees it says the likeness is striking.

Waylen had a long artistic career, in that he was commissioned in about 1868 by Turnbull to paint Turnbull's three children together. Later in 1884 Waylen, as a present to Turnbull, painted Turnbull's great uncle Colonel George Turnbull.
