= Lewis Merrill =

United States Army general

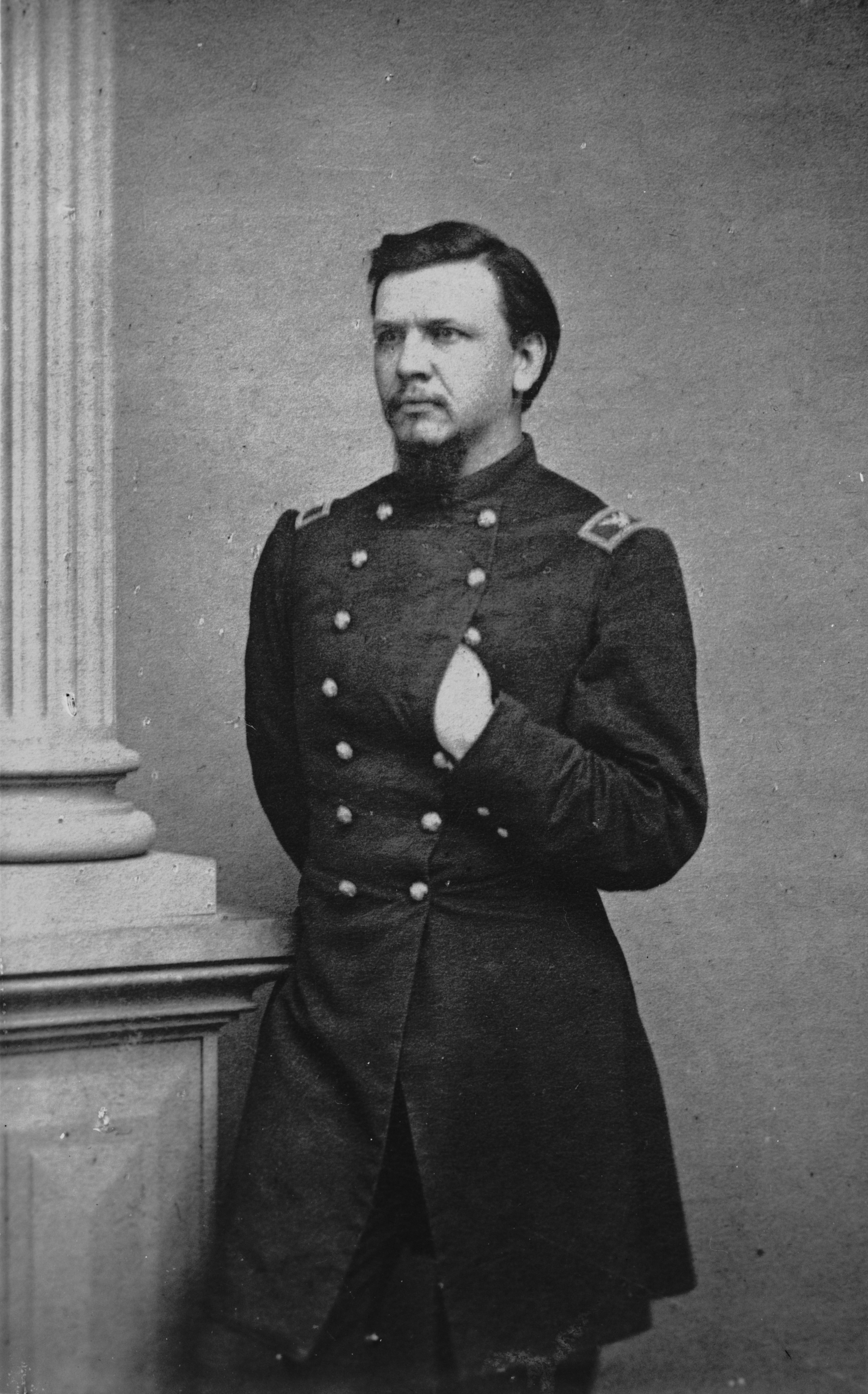
- Born: October 28, 1834; New Berlin, Pennsylvania
- Died: February 27, 1896 (aged 61); Philadelphia, Pennsylvania
- Burial place: Arlington National Cemetery
- Military career
- Allegiance: United States of America; Union
- Branch: United States Army; Union Army
- Service years: 1855–1886
- Rank: Brevet Brigadier General; Colonel (Mo. Volunteers); Lieutenant Colonel (USA)
- Units: 1st U.S. Dragoons; 2nd U.S. Dragoons; 7th U.S. Cavalry
- Commands: 2nd Missouri Cavalry Regiment
- Conflicts: American Civil War; American Indian Wars

Lewis Merrill (October 28, 1834 – February 27, 1896) was a career officer in the United States Army noted for his work in resisting the early Ku Klux Klan organization in several Southern states. During the American Civil War, he combated guerrillas in Missouri.

== Life and work ==
Merrill was born at New Berlin, Pennsylvania, the son of Sarah (Lewis) and James Merrill. He studied at the University at Lewisburg (Pennsylvania), graduated at West Point in 1855, was assigned to duty as second lieutenant with the First Dragoons, and served in Missouri, in Kansas Territory, and with the Utah Expedition. In 1861 he was appointed a first lieutenant with the 2nd Dragoons.

In 1861, as colonel and first cavalry officer on the staff of John C. Frémont, he organized the Second Missouri Volunteer Cavalry, usually known as Merrill's Horse, to fight the secessionist Missouri State Guard and guerrillas in central Missouri. His regiment was well known for its strict military organization and its aggressiveness in carrying out its anti-guerrilla mission. Colonel Merrill later commanded the District of St. Louis and then the Department of Northern Missouri. In 1864, he was commander of the cavalry bureau at St. Louis and took part in the engagements at Franklin, Missouri. The next year, he was sent against guerrillas in northern Georgia and Alabama. On January 13, 1866, President Andrew Johnson nominated Merrill for appointment to the grade of brevet brigadier general, U.S. Volunteers, to rank from March 13, 1865, and the United States Senate confirmed the appointment on March 12, 1866.

=== York County, South Carolina ===
After various western assignments he was placed in command of a military district in York County, South Carolina with orders to break up the Ku Klux Klan.

In February 1871, before Merrill arrived in South Carolina, local black preacher Elias Hill met with local Ku Klux Klan leaders to negotiate the safety of blacks in the community. These negotiations were not successful, and around February 12, eight black men were killed by 500 to 700 whites in black gowns with masks, and was followed by nightly Klan raids for months.

An important black leader in York County of that time was a former Union soldier and local militia leader named James Rainey, also known as Jim Williams. At that time, black militias like this were known as Union Leagues. On February 11, 1871, Jim Williams, along with June Moore (nephew of Elias Hill) and a group of blacks, met with a group of whites led by J. Rufus Bratton at a crossroads near Clay Hill to seek to deescalate tensions. Williams suggested that he would be willing to relinquish his militia weapons, and Black Union League leaders agreed to cease nighttime meetings. The truce was broken the next day when a race riot broke out involving 500 to 700 whites in neighboring Union County, killing eight blacks. On March 6, 1871, Bratton led a group of about seventy white men who attacked a number of houses and hanged Williams.

Companies B, E, and K of George Armstrong Custer's Seventh U.S. Cavalry led by Merrill arrived in the area to try to quell the violence, Elias Hill stepped in to lead the league, now in disarray. In another raid shortly later, Hill's nephews, Solomon Hill and June Moore, were attacked and forced to renounce their Republican Party affiliation in the local paper, the Yorkville Enquirer. Elias Hill was also attacked on May 5, 1871. This was the first episode of Ku Klux Klan violence Merrill saw in York County firsthand, and he was unable to immediately step in to protect the black citizens of York County. Eight days after the attack on Hill, Merrill met with community leaders demanding change, although violence continued over the summer. Merrill's efforts eventually led to the dismantling of much of the Klan in the county, although Bratton, who ran away to Canada for a number of years to escape prosecution, was never successfully prosecuted.

From 1871 to 1873, he succeeded in this so well that he received the thanks of the War Department. When similar conditions arose in the Red River district of Louisiana, he was made commander there in 1875, remaining until the following year. As a consequence of his activities, his nomination as lieutenant colonel in the regular army was held up for several years in the Senate by Southern sympathizers, but it was finally confirmed on September 27, 1890, retroactive to January 9, 1886. Merrill had retired as a major on May 21, 1886.

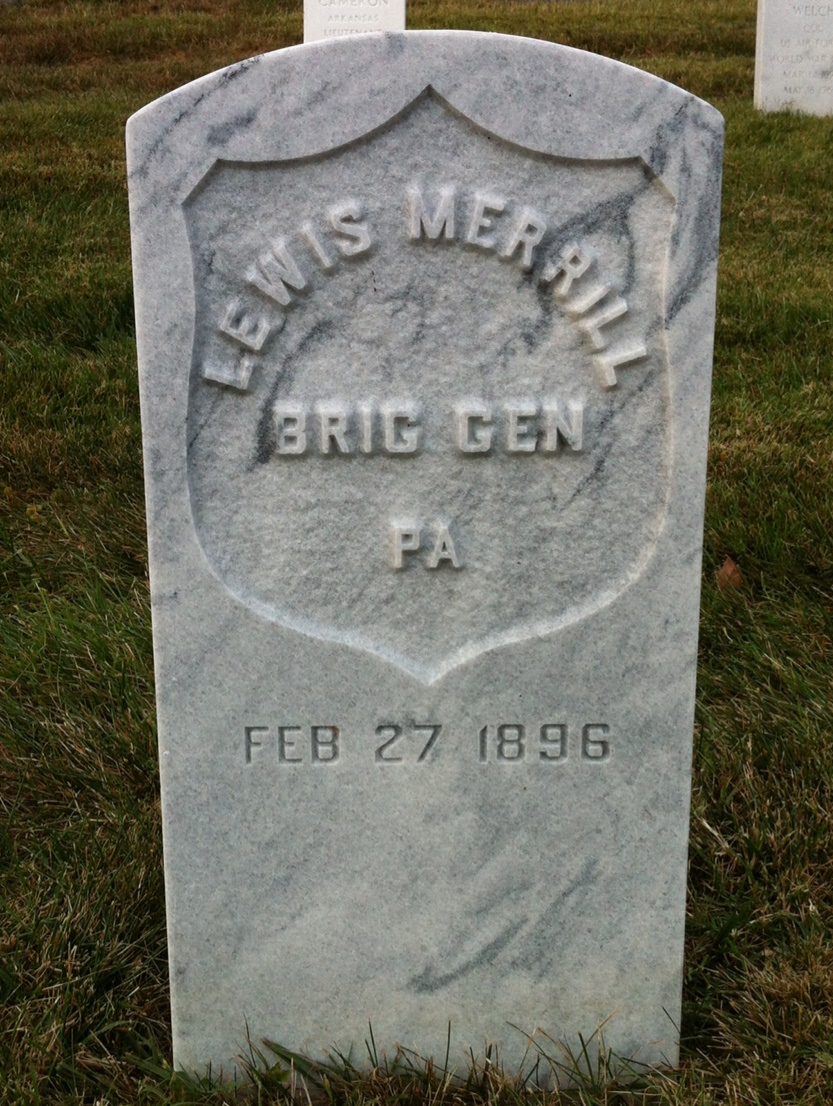
General Merrill's gravestone at Arlington National Cemetery

One reason his appointment was held up in the Senate was that his peers did not highly regard him in the Seventh Cavalry. Major Marcus Reno labeled Merrill as a "notorious coward and shirk." Captain Frederick Benteen, who disliked Reno, commented, "Poor a soldier as Reno was, he was a long way ahead of Merrill," whom he also labeled a "chump." Finally, Merrill was accused of accepting cash rewards from a Carpetbagger government for the Ku Klux Klan members his command captured and of accepting a bribe while acting as a judge advocate in a court-martial.

On February 27, 1890, Merrill was made a brevet brigadier general of the United States Army for his gallant service with the 7th Cavalry during the Battle of Canyon Creek, Montana, in September 1877.

Merrill died in Philadelphia, Pennsylvania, on February 27, 1896. He is buried in Arlington National Cemetery.

== In popular culture ==
In March 2016, Amazon acquired the distribution rights to Joseph Gordon-Levitt’s K Troop that is about Merrill's command in York County, South Carolina. A release date and other details are unknown at this time.

== See also ==
- List of American Civil War brevet generals (Union)
