= John Simpson (Presbyterian) =

The Reverend John Simpson (1740–1808), was a Presbyterian minister and Whig leader in the American Revolution.

== Life ==
Of Scotch-Irish descent, Simpson married Mary Remer (1743-1812) in 1765 in New Jersey. He graduated Princeton College with high honors in 1763, and was licensed to preach by the Presbytery of New Brunswick, New Jersey in 1770. He preached in New Brunswick for two years before he moved to Philadelphia Pastorate in 1772. In 1774 he was installed at Chester County, South Carolina and preached at upper and lower Fishing Creek and Bethesda.

Due to Simpson's actions at Alexander's Old Field and Mobley's, the Loyalist commander Christian Huck came to capture Simpson at Fishing Creek Church on June 11, 1780; finding no one there he burned the church and killed William Strong. Huck then burned Simpson's home and library leaving Mrs. Simpson and the Simpson children homeless. The events of June 11 led to the battle of Huck's Defeat. In 1790 Simpson moved to Pendleton District and continued his ministerial work until his death in 1808 at Roberts Presbyterian Church.
