= Dutch Fork =

Area of South Carolina, United States

Coordinates: 34°7′N 81°13′W

The Dutch Fork is an area of central South Carolina that spans the counties of Lexington, Newberry, and Richland between the Saluda River and the Broad River. The two rivers fork together here to form the Congaree River. The area is named after the original German settlers of the area, with the word "Dutch" an Anglicization of the term deutsch (meaning "German" in the German language). Initial settlement of the area largely took place between 1730 and 1766, when the British authorities of the Province of South Carolina offered incentives to foreign Protestants to settle in what was then the colony's backcountry.

== The Dutch Fork today ==
The use of a German dialect has not survived in the Dutch Fork as it has to this day in the Pennsylvania Dutch Country. German heritage is preserved mainly in place-names and family names as well as in the presence of a number of Lutheran churches, some dating back to the 18th century. Newberry remains the only county in South Carolina with a Lutheran population of over 10%. The Dutch Fork Baptist Church was established in 1922. Dutch Fork High School, Dutch Fork Middle School, and Dutch Fork Elementary School are three of the nineteen schools in the Lexington and Richland County public school system's District Five, which covers much of the Lexington and Richland County portions of the Dutch Fork. The Dutch Square Center, a shopping mall, also preserves the old name. The Dutch Fork cultivar of the China rose (Rosa chinensis) was developed in the area. Since 2005, a monthly newspaper, The Dutch Fork Chronicle, has been published.
