= Martha Bratton =

American Revolution patriot (1750–1816)

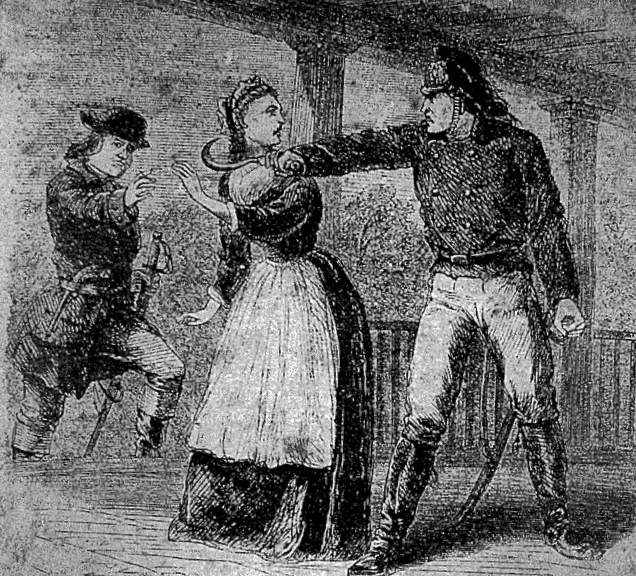
- A British Legion soldier threatening to kill Bratton if she did not reveal the whereabouts of her husband. (Mid-nineteenth century illustration, Harper's Weekly)
- Born: Martha Robertson; 1750; Rowan County, North Carolina
- Died: 1816; Brattonsville, South Carolina
- Known for: Destroying a gunpowder cache, notifying her husband of British military movements, and nursing wounded American and British combatants
- Spouse: Col. William Bratton

Martha Bratton (née Robertson, c. 1750 – 1816) was an American woman who supported the Patriot cause during the American Revolutionary War. In 1780, she blew up a cache of gunpowder to prevent it from falling into British hands. Troops of the British Legion questioned her as to her husband William's whereabouts in June of that year, and a battle ensued after she used a slave to inform him of their movements. Their house, a girls' school after Bratton's death, is one of the properties of the Brattonsville Historic District, which is listed on the National Register of Historic Places.

== Early life ==
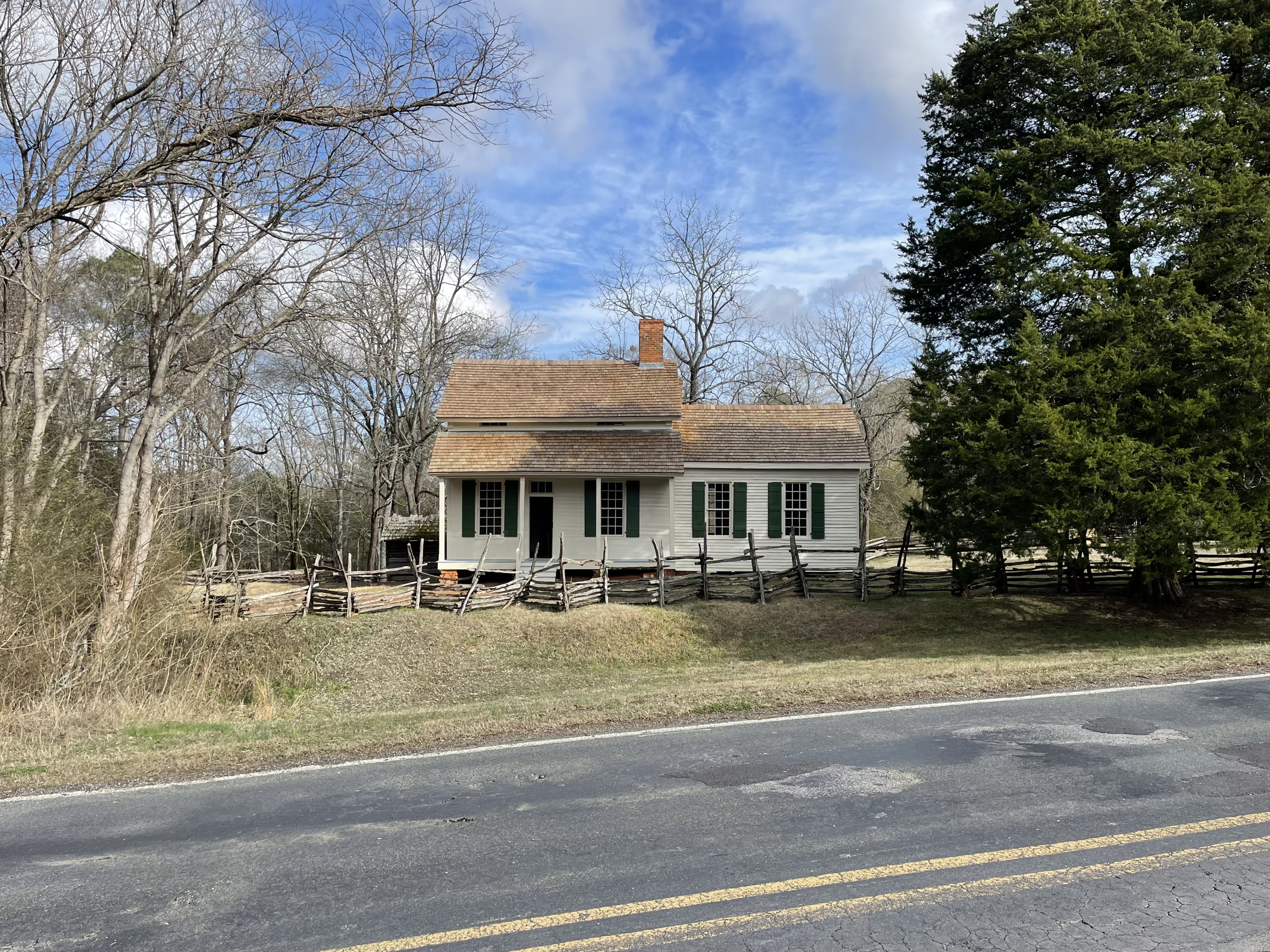
The Revolutionary House, built in 1776 by Colonel William Bratton (who fought in the Revolutionary War), was originally a one-room log house with a small porch. Later additions were added to the original structure, and clapboard siding was placed over the original logs. The house was heavily remodeled in 1838. Image Courtesy of Culture & Heritage Museums, York County, SC.

In 1750 Martha Robertson was born in Rowan County, North Carolina to Hugh Robertson and Luisa Steele She married William Bratton there in 1765, becoming Martha Bratton. William was born in Pennsylvania, or County Antrim, Ireland in 1743.

Alive when Bratton wrote her will were daughters Mary, Jean, Martha Foster, Ealie (Elsie) Sadler, Agnes McCaw, and Elizabeth Gavine, and sons John S. and William Bratton. Their daughter Alise (Elsie) was born on 1766 and son William was born in 1774 in York, South Carolina. Their house, a property of the Brattonsville Historic District, is a listing on the National Register of Historic Places.

== American Revolutionary War ==
During the American Revolutionary War, William was commissioned into the South Carolina Militia, serving under Thomas Sumter at the rank of colonel and seeing action at Huck's Defeat. Prior the 1780 Siege of Charleston, a cache of gunpowder was stored at the Bratton's house in South Carolina in response to orders from Governor John Rutledge. The British became informed about the presence of this cache and moved to seize it. As there was insufficient time to evacuate the gunpowder, Bratton instead blew it up, timing the explosion to coincide with the arrival of the forces sent to seize the cache. Confronted with threats of harsh punishment, she told the arriving troops: "Let the consequence be what it will, I glory in having prevented the mischief contemplated by the cruel enemies of my country".

In June 1780, troops of the British Legion, a Loyalist military unit, questioned Bratton as to her husband's location. She refused to reveal his position, even as a Loyalist soldier held a sickle at her throat. That night, Bratton sent a message to her husband about where nearby Loyalist forces were staying via Watt, an enslaved family servant, prompting a surprise attack by William's troops. The battlefield included her home; she put her son in the chimney to prevent him from being injured by stray gunfire. The victorious Americans housed a number of prisoners of war in the Bratton home. Martha nursed the wounded from the battle.

== Death and legacy ==
William died in 1815 and Bratton a year later. They both died in York, South Carolina, in what is now Brattonsville. After Bratton's death, her son inherited her home and later converted it into a school for girls. In her will, Bratton named 48 enslaved people that she owned. Brattonsville was named after the couple.

== Bibliography ==
- Casey, Susan (Susan Mary) (2015). "Women heroes of the American Revolution : 20 stories of espionage, sabotage, defiance, and rescue". Chicago, Illinois : Chicago Review Press.
