= Jim Williams (militia leader) =

African-American militia leader (1830–1871)

- Born: c. 1830; York County, South Carolina, U.S.
- Died: March 6, 1871 (aged 40–41); York County, South Carolina, U.S.
- Occupations: Farm laborer, soldier, militia leader
- Political party: Republican
- Spouse: Rose

Jim Williams (c. 1830 – March 6, 1871) was an American soldier and militia leader in the 1860s and 1870s in York County, South Carolina. He escaped slavery during the US Civil War and joined the Union Army. After the war, Williams led a black militia organization which sought to protect black rights in the area. In 1871, he was lynched and hanged by members of the local Ku Klux Klan. As a result, a large group of local Black people immigrated to Liberia in West Africa.

== Early life ==
Williams was born James Rainey in York County, South Carolina, on the plantation of Samuel Rainey about 20 miles (32 km) from Yorkville. He escaped from the Rainey plantation during the Civil War and joined the Union Army, where he eventually fought under General William Tecumseh Sherman in Georgia and the Carolinas. After the war, Rainey changed his surname to Williams and returned to York County and married a woman named Rose, with whom he fathered two children, and a previous son from his first Wife Olli Dunovant or Dunnavant who was possibly of Barbadian descent. There he fought for the protection of the civil and political rights of former slaves. He also organized a Black militia unit - such units were called "Union Leagues".

== York County Klan ==
In February 1871, Williams and local preacher Elias Hill met with local Ku Klux Klan leaders including James Rufus Bratton to negotiate the safety of Black people in the community. These negotiations were not successful, and around February 12, eight Black men were killed by 500 to 700 whites in black gowns with masks, and was followed by nightly Klan raids for months. Bratton was the nephew of Williams' former enslaver, Samuel Rainey, and was a former surgeon in the Confederate Army.

During this time, some local whites claimed Williams had threatened to kill local whites and that Williams' militia was stockpiling weapons. It was also claimed that Williams claimed to desire to rape white women if he could. Bratton also claimed that Williams and his militia were responsible for a rash of fires at white-owned properties.

== Lynching and death ==
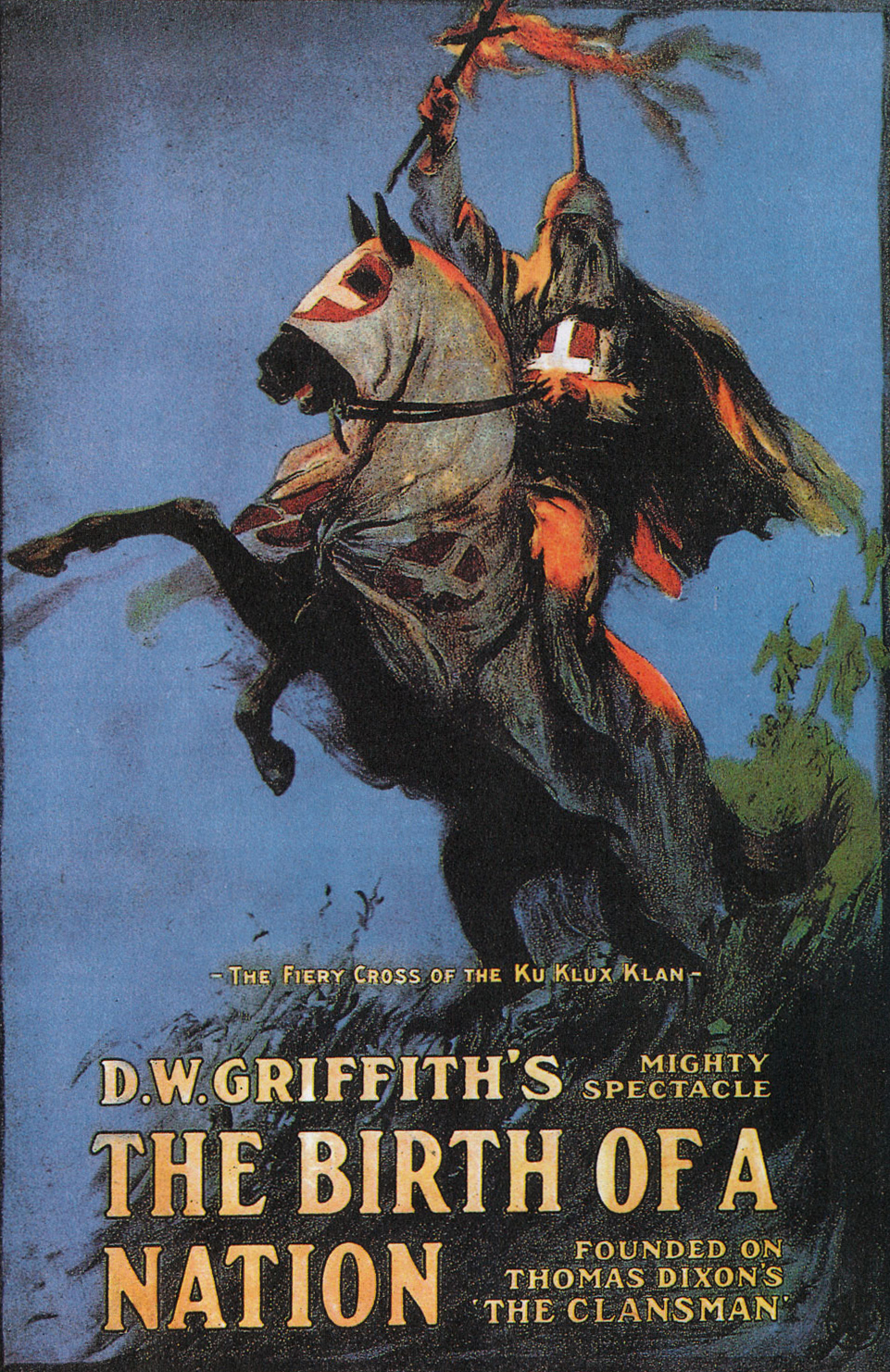
Movie poster for The Birth of a Nation, partially inspired by the life of J. Rufus Bratton

On March 6, 1871, James Rufus Bratton led a group of about seventy white men from their muster at the Briar Patch muster ground 5 miles (8 km) west of Yorkville to the Williams cabin. The mob first went to the home of Union League member Andy Timons, beating Timons to learn the whereabouts of Williams' home. At his cabin, they found Williams hiding under the floorboards. They grabbed him and pulled him kicking and screaming from the house. Someone, probably Bratton, placed a noose around Williams' neck. Outside, they tied the rope to a tree 10 to 12 feet (3.0 to 3.7 m) off the ground and forced Williams to climb to the limb. Bob Caldwell, another Klansman, climbed to the limb and pushed Williams, who then dangled from the limb by his hands. Caldwell used a knife to hack at William's fingers until he released, whence he "died cursing, pleading and praying all in one breath." Williams was subsequently brought to Bratton's office where Bratton, in his medical capacity, served the inquest.

== Legacy ==
The mob visited several other homes of men involved in the Union League militia, succeeding in gathering 23 guns but no other members. Members of the league swore vengeance, but did not act. Companies B, E, and K of George Armstrong Custer's Seventh U.S. Cavalry led by Major Lewis Merrill arrived in the area to try to quell the violence. Elias Hill stepped in to lead the league, now in disarray. In another raid, Hill's nephews, Solomon Hill and June Moore, were attacked and forced to renounce their Republican Party affiliation in the local paper, the Yorkville Enquirer. Hill himself was attacked in March.

This was the first episode of Ku Klux Klan violence Merrill saw in York County, and he was unable to step in to protect the Black citizens of York County. Eight days after the attack, Merrill met with community leaders demanding change, although violence continued over the summer. Merrill's efforts eventually led to the dismantling of much of the Klan in the county, although Bratton was never successfully prosecuted. In October 1871, Hill and his nephews led a large group of local Black residents immigrating to Liberia to escape the violence.
