= McConnells, South Carolina =

Town in South Carolina, United States

- Town
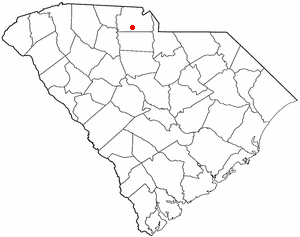
- Location of McConnells, South Carolina
- Coordinates: 34°52′24″N 81°13′36″W
- Country: United States
- State: South Carolina
- County: York

Area
  - Total: 3.42 sq mi (8.86 km^{2})
  - Land: 3.39 sq mi (8.78 km^{2})
  - Water: 0.031 sq mi (0.08 km^{2})
- Elevation: 686 ft (209 m)

Population (2020)
  - Total: 280
  - Density: 82.6/sq mi (31.89/km^{2})
- Time zone: UTC-5 (Eastern (EST))
  - Summer (DST): UTC-4 (EDT)
- ZIP code: 29726
- Area codes: 803, 839
- FIPS code: 45-43675
- GNIS feature ID: 2406125
- Website: https://www.townofmcconnells.com/

McConnells is a town in York County, South Carolina, United States and a suburb of York. The population was 255 at the 2010 census.

== History ==
The Bethesda Presbyterian Church, Brattonsville Historic District, and Hightower Hall are listed on the National Register of Historic Places.

== Geography ==
According to the United States Census Bureau, the town has a total area of 3.4 square miles (8.9 km^{2}), all land.

== Media ==
McConnells is home to a free daily online and monthly print newspaper, the YoCoNews that covers all of York and Lancaster counties.

== Demographics ==
Historical population
Census	Pop.	Note	%±
1910	279		—
1920	247		−11.5%
1930	279		13.0%
1940	263		−5.7%
1950	255		−3.0%
1960	266		4.3%
1970	213		−19.9%
1980	171		−19.7%
1990	157		−8.2%
2000	287		82.8%
2010	255		−11.1%
2020	280		9.8%
U.S. Decennial Census

As of the census of 2000, there were 287 people, 101 households, and 76 families residing in the town. The population density was 83.4 inhabitants per square mile (32.2/km^{2}). There were 107 housing units at an average density of 31.1 per square mile (12.0/km^{2}). The racial makeup of the town was 71.43% White, 28.22% African American, and 0.35% from two or more races. Hispanic or Latino of any race were 0.70% of the population.

There were 101 households, out of which 37.6% had children under the age of 18 living with them, 63.4% were married couples living together, 7.9% had a female householder with no husband present, and 23.8% were non-families. 23.8% of all households were made up of individuals, and 10.9% had someone living alone who was 65 years of age or older. The average household size was 2.84 and the average family size was 3.38.

In the town, the population was spread out, with 27.5% under the age of 18, 7.7% from 18 to 24, 33.1% from 25 to 44, 23.0% from 45 to 64, and 8.7% who were 65 years of age or older. The median age was 36 years. For every 100 females, there were 102.1 males. For every 100 females age 18 and over, there were 94.4 males.

The median income for a household in the town was $41,875, and the median income for a family was $61,094. Males had a median income of $26,750 versus $22,100 for females. The per capita income for the town was $15,831. About 5.3% of families and 5.7% of the population were below the poverty line, including 14.1% of those under the age of eighteen and 8.1% of those 65 or over.

== Notable person ==
- Ivory Latta, guard for the Washington Mystics of the WNBA
