= William Bratton (Revolutionary War) =

American military officer

- Born: 1742 (Note: There are lineage records that state that he might have been born in Pennsylvania. His year of birth is also stated as 1743.); County Antrim, Ireland
- Died: February 9, 1815 (aged 72–73); Brattonsville, South Carolina
- Spouse: Martha Bratton

Colonel William Bratton (1742 – February 9, 1815) was an American military officer who served during the Revolutionary War. He led Patriot forces in a successful 1780 ambush against Loyalist troops led by Captain Christian Huck. Bratton's men killed Huck during the battle, which was one of the first battles of the war's Southern campaign to be won by a force of Patriot militiamen. The Bratton family house, which was transformed into a girls' school after Bratton's death, is one of the properties of the Brattonsville Historic District, which is listed on the National Register of Historic Places.

== Early life ==
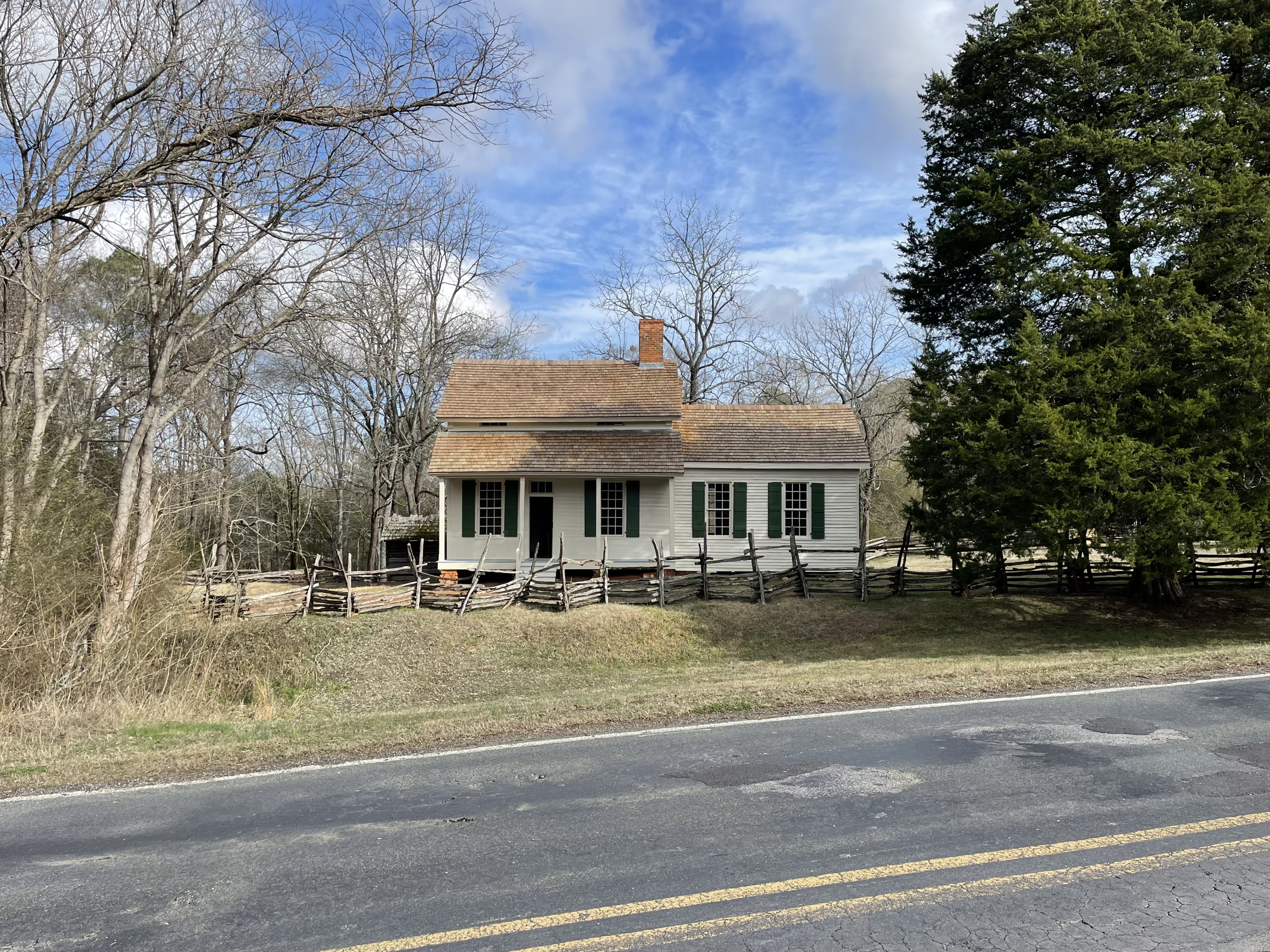
The Revolutionary House, built in 1776 by Colonel William Bratton (who fought in the Revolutionary War), was originally a one-room log house with a small porch. Later additions were added to the original structure, and clapboard siding was placed over the original logs. The house was heavily remodeled in 1838.

William Bratton was born in County Antrim, Ireland in 1742. Bratton's family immigrated to the American colonies when he was young. His family moved to South Carolina in the 1760s, having lived in Pennsylvania, Virginia, and North Carolina before that, according to family tradition. Bratton married Martha Robertson or Robinson in Rowan County, North Carolina in 1765. Martha was born in Rowan County in 1750.

Bratton and Martha had eight children. Their daughters include Mary, Jean, Martha Foster, Ealie (Elsie) Sadler, Agnes McCaw, and Elizabeth Gavine, and their sons John S. and William Bratton. (Note: Their daughter Alise (Elsie) was born in 1766 and son William was born in 1774 in York, South Carolina.) The Brattons settled on the South Fork of Fishing Creek, with a two-story house built on 200 acres of land that was purchased in 1766. Their house, a property of the Brattonsville Historic District, is a listing on the National Register of Historic Places.

== Military career ==
Bratton, was commissioned into the South Carolina Militia at the rank of captain, ultimately being promoted to the rank of colonel. By 1780, he was serving under General Thomas Sumter. After the Siege of Charleston, the British began to win most of the battles in the war's Southern theater. He fought at Huck's Defeat, a major American victory which changed the course of the war in South Carolina. In June 1780, troops of the British Legion, a Loyalist military unit, questioned Martha wife as to William's location. She refused to reveal his position, even as a Loyalist soldier held a sickle to her throat. That night, via Watt, an enslaved family servant, she sent a message to Bratton about where nearby Loyalist forces were staying, prompting a surprise attack by his men; the battlefield included his home. The victorious Americans housed a number of prisoners of war in the Bratton home. Martha nursed the wounded from the battle.

About 133 men who served under William Hill, Edward Lacey, John McClure, and Bratton readied themselves for battle early in the morning of July 12, 1780. They were near Bratton's house at the plantation of James Williamson, called Williamson's Plantation. Bratton led the patriots in the attack against Captain Christian Huck of the British Legion in the battle which became known as Huck's Defeat. About 120 Loyalist militia and regular soldiers were defeated in what is also called the Battle of Williamson's Plantation. Huck was killed. With this fight, the patriots learned that they did not have to arrange themselves in rows, face their enemy, and shoot at them, while they were fired upon. Instead, guerrilla warfare was much more effective, particularly if they were outnumbered. This approach and the morale boost helped them win the Battles of Kings Mountain (October 7, 1780) and Cowpens (January 17, 1781). Bratton served until the end of the war.

== Later life and death ==
Bratton served both the State House of Representatives, starting in 1785, and the State Senate, from 1791 and into 1794. He was also the Pinckney District sheriff and a York County justice of the peace. He was also a planter, businessman, and merchant. He owned enslaved servants. William died on February 9, 1815 and Martha a year later. They both died in York, South Carolina, in what is now Brattonsville, South Carolina, which was named after the couple. After Martha's death, their son inherited their home and later converted it into a school for girls. In her will, Martha named 48 enslaved people.
