= Hightower Hall =

Historic house in South Carolina, United States

- U.S. National Register of Historic Places
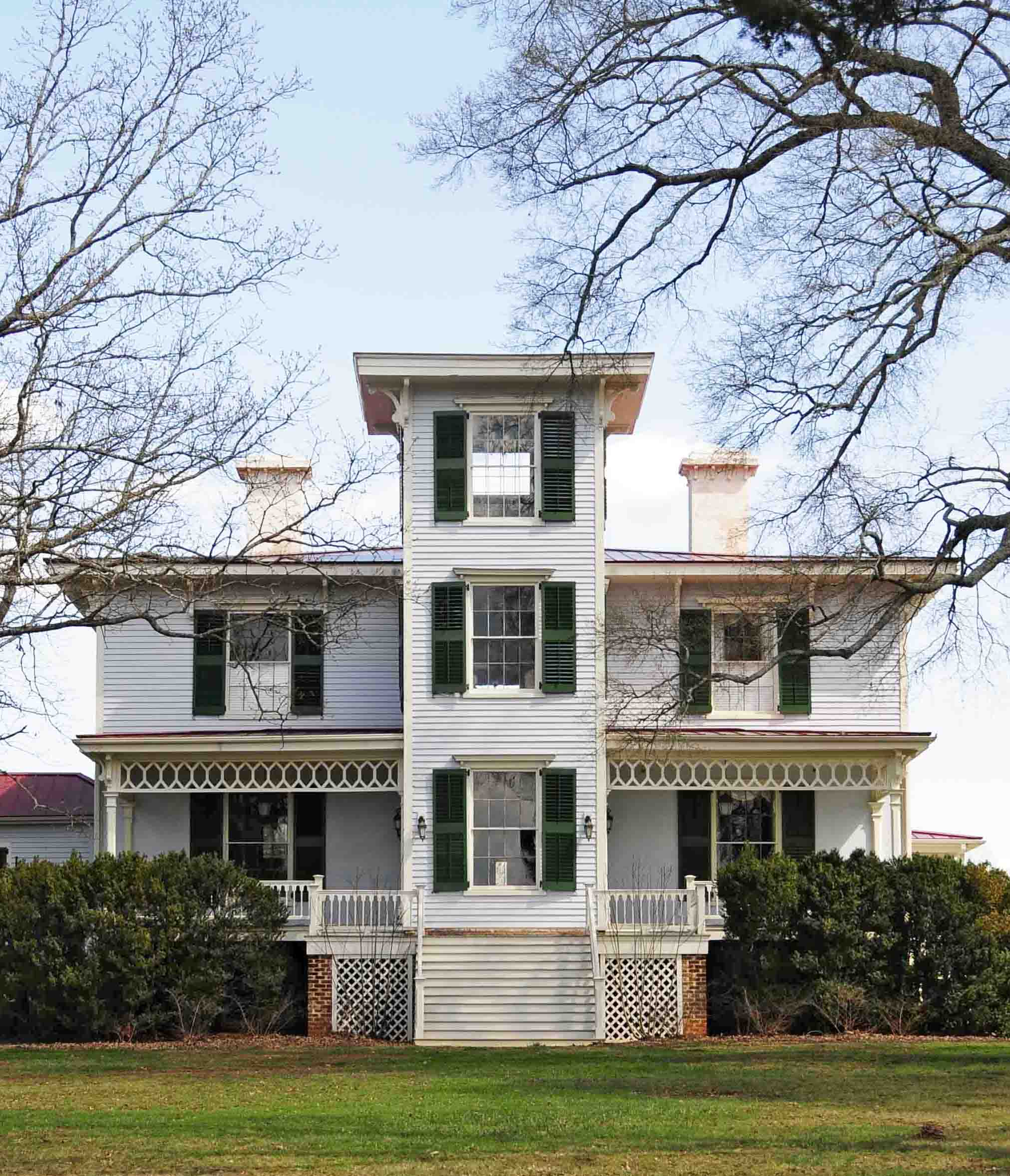
- Hightower Hall, March 2012

- Location within South Carolina Location within the United States
- Location: County Road 165, near McConnells, South Carolina
- Coordinates: 34°52′52″N 81°10′53″W
- Area: 23.9 acres (9.7 ha)
- Built: c. 1854
- Built by: Cranford, O.P.
- Architectural style: Italian Villa
- NRHP reference No.: 82003907
- Added to NRHP: June 28, 1982

Hightower Hall (Forrest Hall) is a historic home located near McConnells, York County, South Carolina. Completed in 1856, Hightower Hall is a two-story, weatherboarded frame dwelling in a vernacular interpretation of the Italianate style. The front facade features a prominent three-story tower that rises ten feet above the main roof of the house. It also has a low-pitched roof, deep eaves, decorative brackets and verandahs. Also on the property are two barns and two slave cabins.

== History ==
Construction began in 1854 by John Simpson Bratton Jr. and Harriet Rainy Bratton. In 1856 the home was completed and was called Forrest Hall. In 1888 John Bratton died, followed by his wife Harriet in 1912. Sophia (Bratton) Witherspoon, the daughter of John and Harriet, and her husband Robert Witherspoon gained ownership.

The home was purchased by Mr. R. F. Draper, and IBM executive, in 1958 where it gained the name "Hightower Hall." The family acquired an additional 1,285 acres by the time of his death in 1995. Brattonsville Historic District purchased the property and surrounding 485 acres of the Draper Estate with help from the Nation Ford Land Trust, the Friends of Historic Brattonsville and the York County Council. The remaining property was purchased by the State of South Carolina, becoming part of the South Carolina Wildlife Management system.

It was added to the National Register of Historic Places in 1982.

Hightower Hall is now part of Historic Brattonsville and is open as a historic house museum.
