= Huck's Defeat =

Battle of the American Revolutionary War

- Part of the American Revolutionary War
Date	July 12, 1780
Location	York County, South Carolina 34°51′55″N 81°10′32″W
Result	American victory

Belligerents
United States	Great Britain

Commanders and leaders
William Bratton	Christian Huck †

Strength
250 militia	55 regulars 60 militia

Casualties and losses
1 killed 1 wounded	81 killed, wounded, and captured

Huck's Defeat or the Battle of Williamson's Plantation was one of the first Patriot victories of the southern campaign of the American Revolutionary War. On July 12, 1780, about 250 Patriot militia surprised half their number of Loyalists bivouacked with lax security in York County, South Carolina. Attacked from three sides, the Loyalists were overwhelmed by Patriots seeking revenge for perceived ill treatment, and many were killed without mercy. Since all descriptions are by Patriots, the historical record is very one-sided.

== Background ==
In May 1780, British forces captured the only significant American army in the South at Charleston, South Carolina, and quickly occupied four vital seats of government: Camden, Cheraw, Georgetown, and Ninety Six. Believing the Patriots had been fully defeated in South Carolina, Sir Henry Clinton abrogated the terms of surrender, which had allowed parolees to remain neutral for the remainder of the war. Under terms of the proclamation of June 3, 1780, Patriots were compelled to either take an oath of loyalty to the king or be regarded as "rebels and enemies of their country." Clinton then departed for New York, leaving Lieutenant-General Lord Cornwallis in command of the British army in the South.

== Preliminaries ==
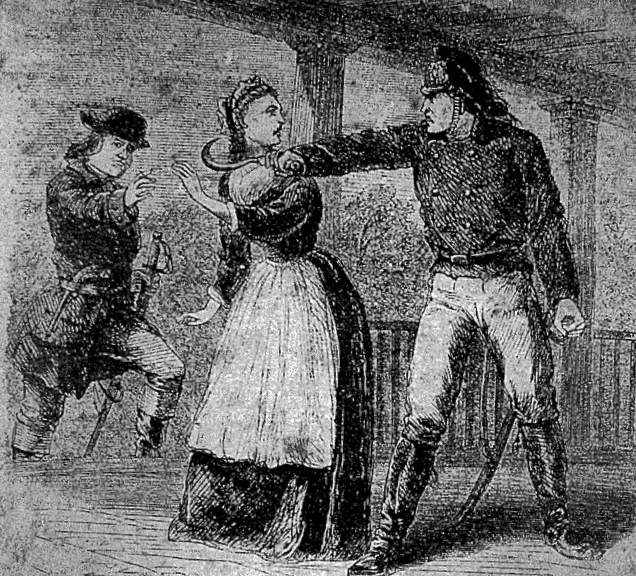
A soldier threatening to kill Martha Bratton if she did not reveal the whereabouts of her husband William. (Mid-nineteenth century illustration, Harper's Weekly)

On June 1, 1780, British forces established a fortified outpost at Rocky Mount on the upper Catawba River, near the North Carolina border. It was garrisoned by the New York Volunteers, a Provincial regiment under the command of Lieutenant-Colonel George Turnbull, a career British officer. In early July, Turnbull ordered Christian Huck, a former Philadelphia lawyer and captain of an independent company attached to the British Legion, to find the rebel leaders and persuade other area residents to swear allegiance to the king. A native of Germany, Huck was one of many Pennsylvania Loyalists whose property was confiscated by the Patriots after the British evacuated Philadelphia. He was charged with high treason and banished from the state. He then joined the British army at New York. Huck held a great deal of bitterness toward Patriots in general, and the Scotch-Irish Presbyterians in particular. During an earlier incursion into what was then called the Upper District between the Broad and Catawba Rivers (modern Chester County, South Carolina), his troops had burnt the home and library of Rev. John Simpson, a Patriot leader and influential Presbyterian minister. A week later, Huck and his men invaded the New Acquisition District (roughly modern York County, South Carolina), and destroyed the ironworks of William Hill, another influential Patriot.

After destroying Hill's Ironworks on June 3 and putting the rebel garrison there to flight, Huck convened a compulsory meeting of the remaining male residents of the New Acquisition District (mostly men too old to fight). In his "Reminiscences" Major Joseph McJunkin, a Whig militia officer then serving with the Fair Forest Regiment, quoted Huck as saying on June 3 that “even if the rebels were as thick as the trees, and Jesus Christ would come down and lead them, he could defeat them". On June 22 at Fishing Creek, according to the memoirs of William Hill, who was also not present, Huck proclaimed "that God almighty had become a Rebel, but if there were 20 Gods on that side, they would all be conquered”.

Although neither McJunkin nor Hill was present, they undoubtedly learned of Huck's profanity as word spread. The angry Presbyterian inhabitants of the backcountry called Huck "the swearing captain". After witnessing Huck's tirade, one resident, Daniel Collins, told his wife, "I have come home determined to take my gun and when I lay it down, I lay down my life with it."

Huck's coarse manner and rough treatment of people in the Catawba River Valley prompted more men to join the rebels, who were organizing a militia brigade under Brigadier General Thomas Sumter. On July 11, 1780, Huck raided the home of the partisan leader Captain John McClure on Fishing Creek in present-day Chester County, caught his brother and brother-in-law with newly made bullets, and sentenced them to hang as traitors at sunrise the next day. Huck's detachment, consisting of about 35 British Legion dragoons, 20 soldiers of the New York Volunteers, and 60 Loyalist militia, then advanced once more into the New Acquisition and arrived at the plantation of another Patriot militia leader, Colonel William Bratton, later that evening. Shortly thereafter, one of Huck's soldiers put a reaping hook to the neck of Col. Bratton's wife, Martha, in an unsuccessful attempt to discover Bratton's whereabouts. Huck's second-in-command intervened and disciplined the offending Loyalist soldier. Huck next arrested three elderly neighbors of the Brattons, including Col. Bratton's older brother Robert, and told them they too would be executed the next day. William Bratton Jr. recollected these details more than half a century later in an unpublished manuscript. At the time of the events, he was a six-year-old “clinging to his mothers dress and transfixed with horror and fright”.

Huck then proceeded a quarter of a mile southeast of Bratton's plantation to the neighboring house of an elderly Patriot named James Williamson, where he and his approximately 115 men made camp for the night. The five prisoners were secured in a corncrib to await execution.

== Battle ==
With intelligence provided by John McClure's younger sister, Mary, and a Bratton family slave named Watt, the loosely organized Patriot forces swarmed after Huck. About 150 arrived in the vicinity of Williamson's plantation that night, commanded by experienced militia officers. After a brief reconnaissance and some discussion, they agreed to attack Huck from three directions simultaneously.

Huck's security was extremely lax. Shortly after sunrise, at least two of the Patriot groups managed to attack simultaneously. Huck's troops were caught completely by surprise; many were still asleep. The partisans rested their rifles on a split rail fence, from which "they took unerring and deadly aim" at their opponents as they emerged. Huck mounted a horse to rally his troops and was shot in the head by John Carroll, who had loaded two balls in his rifle. Some of the Loyalists surrendered while others fled, hotly pursued by Patriots seeking vengeance. Tory losses were very high. Tarleton later reported that only twenty-four men escaped. Patriot losses were one killed and one wounded; the five prisoners were also released from the corncrib unharmed.

== Importance ==
Although the numbers engaged were small, the importance of the skirmish was immediately clear. As South Carolina historian Walter Edgar has written, "The entire backcountry seemed to take heart. Frontier militia had defeated soldiers of the feared British Legion." Volunteers streamed in to join the partisan militia brigade of General Thomas Sumter. Edgar has called Huck's Defeat "a major turning point in the American Revolution in South Carolina." It was the first of more than thirty-five important battles in South Carolina in late 1780 and early 1781, all but five of which were partisan victories. This chain of successes was essential to the major Patriot victories at King's Mountain and Cowpens. Nevertheless, even Scoggins has noted that the "lack of documentation from the Loyalist camp has created a very one-sided historical record."

== See also ==
- American Revolutionary War § War in the South. Places 'Huck's Defeat' or 'Battle of Williamson's Planation' in overall sequence and strategic context.
