= George Turnbull (soldier) =

- Born: 1728; Scotland
- Died: February 16, 1810; New York City
- Military career
- Rank: Lieutenant Colonel

George Turnbull (1728 – 16 February 1809) was a Scottish American soldier and settler in New York City.

He served as a soldier for about 60 years, initially for about 10 years in Colonel Majoribanks' Regiment of Scots, but then in North America.

== Early life ==
George Turnbull was born in 1728 at Blackadder Mains in the county of Berwickshire in Scotland close to the Scottish/English border.

In 1728, his father Hector Turnbull and Hector's son William had taken a lease from Sir John Home for Blackadder Mains: rent of 1200 marks Scottish money, carriage of 36 loads of coals or 5 Scots shillings each load, 18 capons or 8 shillings each capon, and 18 hens or 6 shillings each hen.

"Colonel George Turnbull and sergeant play a strathspey, 1770, New York" by James Waylen, 26x32inches, 1884. The text below includes the Colonel with a favorite sergeant, the solatium [compensation] of a strathspey after a weary day's work. The prostration of the regimental dog indicates the severity of the march, while the approach of the whisky induces the sergeant to beat time with encreased [stet] emphasis.

== Military career ==
Turnbull was commissioned as a lieutenant in the British army in February 1756 and rose to captain of the 60th Regiment of Foot in November 1765. He sold his commission and left the army between 1774 and 1776 to settle in New York.

He raised and commanded the New York Volunteers in January 1776; this regiment was renumbered in May 1779 as the 3rd American Regiment.

As a captain in the Loyal American Regiment, Turnbull took part in the capture of Fort Montgomery in October 1777, and was commissioned a lieutenant colonel a few days later. He remained in command of the New York Volunteers until the end of the war. General Henry Clinton’s after-orders at 9pm on 23 August directed the New York Volunteers and the British 15th and 46th Regiments to march to New Utrecht on the morning of 24 August, but new orders at 3pm on that date directed the two British regiments to return again to their former Encampments as soon as convenient.

Turnbull was based at Rocky Mount, South Carolina and commanded at the Battle of Rocky Mount, Lancaster County, South Carolina on August 1, 1780.

Captain Christian Huck of Huck’s Defeat (July 12, 1780) served under Turnbull's command. In early July 1780 Turnbull ordered Christian Huck, to find the rebel Patriot Whig leaders and persuade other area residents to swear allegiance to the king.

== Death ==
Turnbull's will is dated 16 February 1809. He died in New York City in 1810.
