= New York Volunteers =

- Active: 1776-1783
- Country: Great Britain
- Allegiance: British Army
- Branch: infantry, dragoons (mounted infantry)
- Type: British provincial unit, (auxiliary troops)
- Size: regiment (400)
- Nickname(s): New York Companies, 1st Dutchess County Company, 3rd American Regiment
- Engagements: American Revolutionary War: New York Campaign (1776); Battle of Forts Clinton and Montgomery (1777); Capture of Savannah (1779); Siege of Charleston (1780); Battle of Camden (1780); Battle of Hobkirk's Hill (1781)

Commanders
- Notable commanders: Lieutenant General Charles Grey; Lieutenant Colonel George Turnbull

The New York Volunteers, also known as the New York Companies and 1st Dutchess County Company, was a British Loyalist Provincial regiment, which served with the British Army, during American Revolutionary War. Eventually, the New York Volunteers became the 3rd American Regiment, after being place on American establishment.

== Regiment formed ==
The "New York Volunteers" were raised in Halifax, Province of Nova Scotia, in January, 1776. Two companies, in the 1776 New York Campaign. In March 1777 a detachment of the Volunteers along with soldiers of the Queen's Rangers were sent out to West Farms to fend off an insurgent raiding party in the act of rustling cattle and horses. The rebels were tracked to the home of Steven Bridge, leading to an evening siege in which as many as 50 were killed and another 27 taken prisoner. During surrender negotiations, Captain Archibald Campbell was shot in the heart and killed. The Volunteers later participated in the 1777 Battle of Forts Clinton and Montgomery. In October, 1778 they were sent to East Florida and were present, at the 1779 capture of Savannah and the 1780 Charleston. The Volunteers were at the 1780 Battle of Camden and the 1781 Hobkirk's Hill.

On May 2, 1779 New York Volunteers were placed on the American Establishment, as the 3rd American Regiment. A detachment of the regiment served, under Charles Grey in the defence of Plymouth, when their transport ship was blown across the Atlantic, after encountering foul weather, while sailing down the North American coastline. It was disbanded in Canada in 1783.
