= French-Quapaw communities of Arkansas =

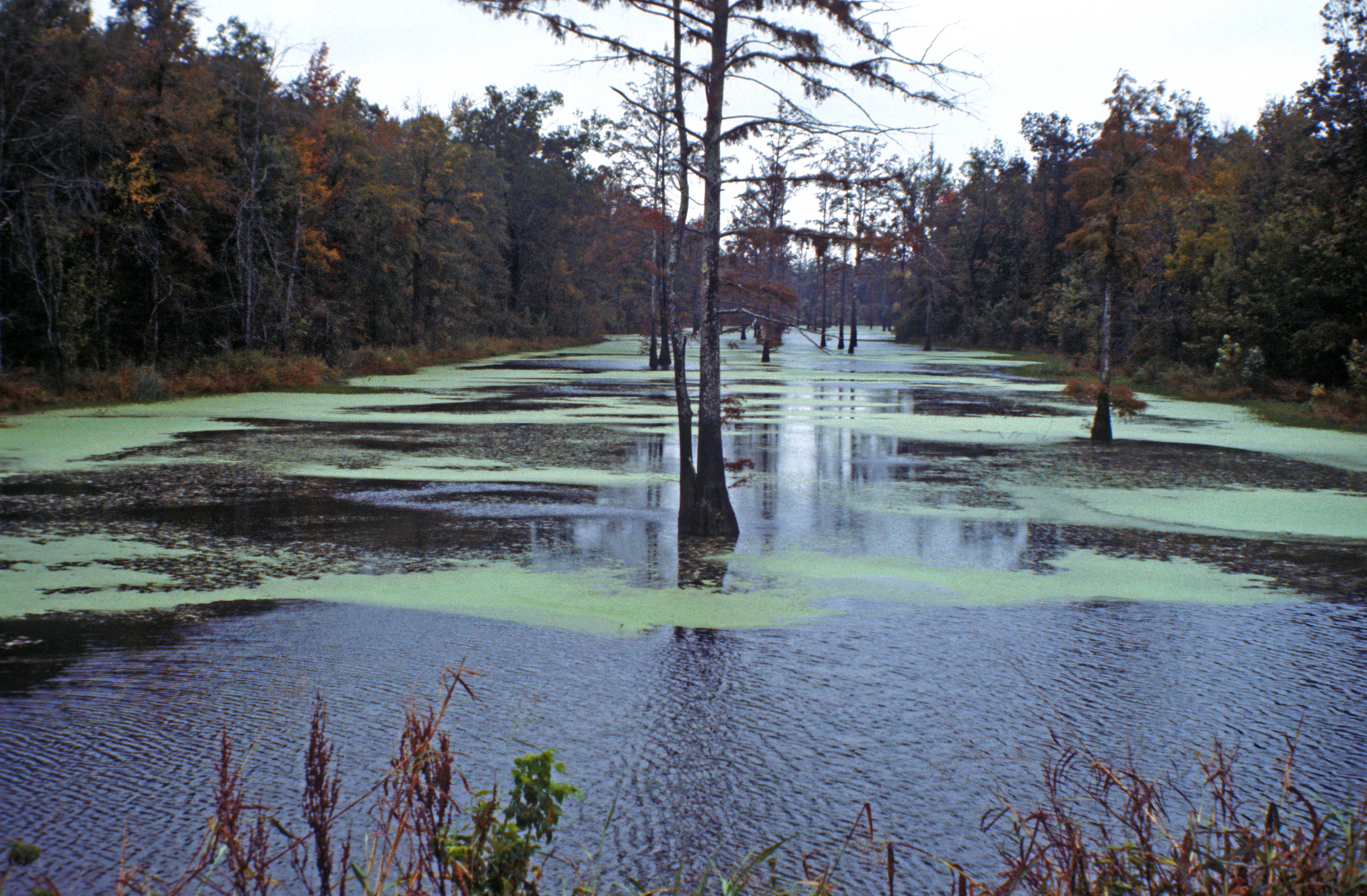
The lower Arkansas River and bayou landscape near Arkansas Post, where French and Quapaw communities developed during the colonial period.

Arkansas Post was established in 1686 by Henri de Tonti at the invitation of the Quapaw. The French-Quapaw communities of Arkansas were culturally mixed communities that developed along the Arkansas River during the French colonial period and continued into the 19th century. Centered around Arkansas Post and nearby Quapaw villages, these communities emerged through alliances, trade relationships, and intermarriage between French colonists and the Quapaw people.

The communities formed part of the broader Arkansas Creoles and Creole cultural world that developed in colonial Arkansas and the lower Mississippi River valley.

Historical sources referred to members of these communities using terms such as "French Creole", "mixed blood", "half-breed", and occasionally "Métis". The term metis was used historically, however it later became more strongly associated with the completely distinct Métis people of Canada today. During the 1800s when English became common, mixed blood became more common, and the group was sometimes referred to as the half blood band of Quapaw.

By the early 19th century, numerous French-Quapaw families lived in southeastern Arkansas, particularly along the Arkansas River between modern Pine Bluff and Arkansas Post. Families associated with these communities included the Dardenne, Cousotte, Valliere, Ray, Imbeau, Baltimore/Bartholomew, Hunt, Faillasse/Fayas, Daigle, Bonne, and others.

Many members of these families maintained connections to both Quapaw and French colonial society and often served as interpreters, guides, traders, laborers, and intermediaries between Native and colonial communities.

== History ==
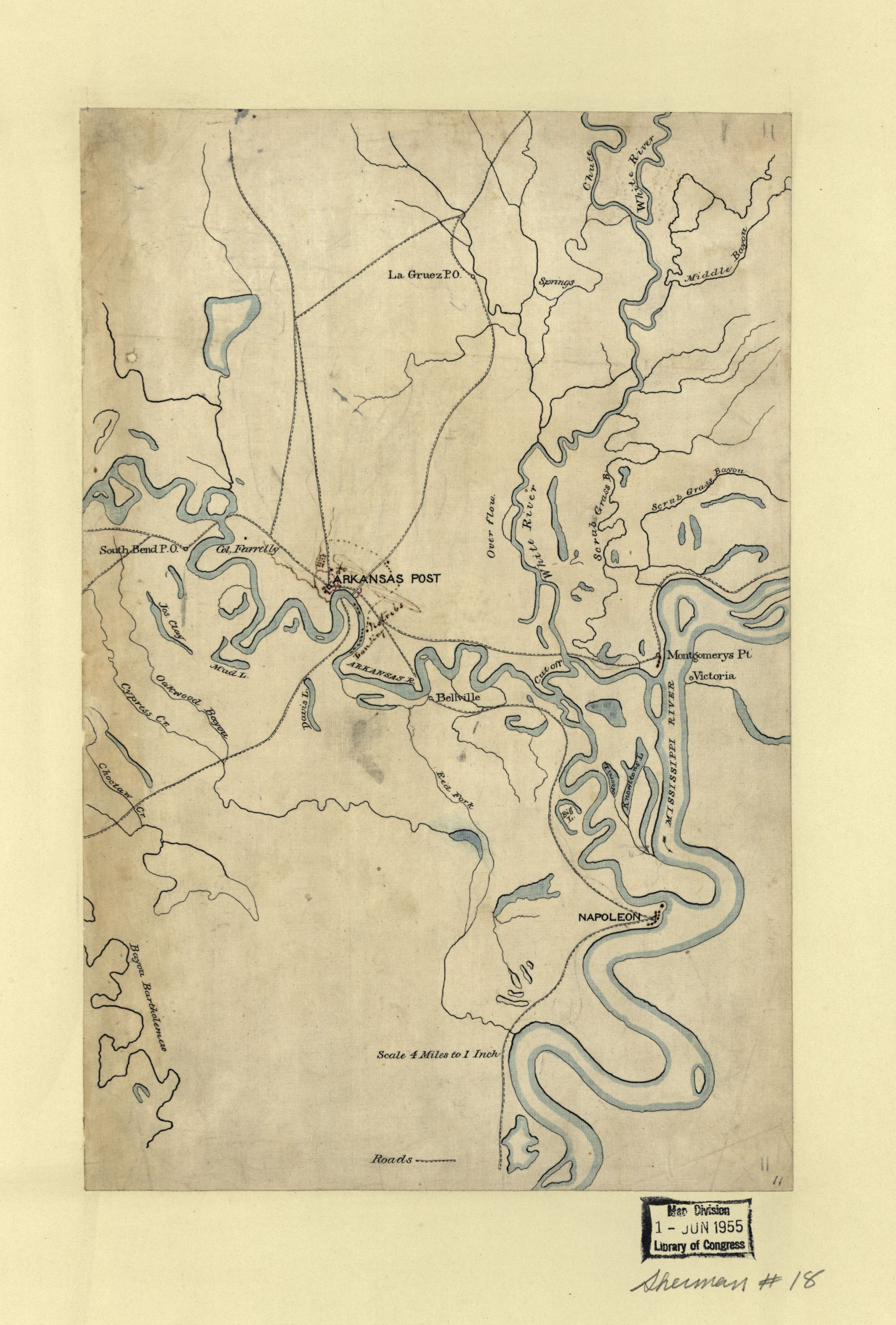
Historic map of the Arkansas Post region along the lower Arkansas River.

=== Arkansas Post and colonial origins ===
Arkansas Post was established in 1686 by Henri de Tonti at the invitation of the Quapaw.

The post became an important center of trade and diplomacy between the French and the Quapaw and remained one of the only long-lasting European settlements in the lower Mississippi valley between Natchez territory and the Illinois Country. It was the first permanent European settlement along the Mississippi River.

Because relatively few French women lived in colonial Arkansas during much of the 18th century, intermarriage between French settlers and Quapaw women became common, especially from the village of Osotouy.

Over time, extended kinship networks developed around Arkansas Post and nearby Quapaw settlements. The survival of Arkansas Post depended heavily on alliance with the Quapaw, who provided trade relationships, military support, and regional political support along the lower Arkansas River frontier. This support was so critical that when Quapaw villages would periodically move for varied reasons, the French fort would also subsequently move. These kinship networks extended into prominent territorial Arkansas families. Antoine Barraque, an early Arkansas merchant and landowner for whom Barraque Township and Barraque Street were later named, married Maria Therese Dardenne, the daughter of Joseph Dardenne and a Quapaw woman.

Several early American visitors and officials commented on the mixed French-Quapaw population of Arkansas Territory. In 1819, naturalist Thomas Nuttall described "families of this mixed race" living along the Arkansas River and wrote that the métis families were "very little removed in their habits from the savages with whose language and manners they are quite familiar".

William F. Pope later wrote that "many of the French settlers intermarried with the Quapaw".

In 1827, Governor George Izard described Quapaw interpreters as "exclusively French creoles or half-breeds".

=== Treaty era and removal ===
During the 1820s and 1830s, the Quapaw experienced increasing pressure from American settlement and treaty cessions.

Many French-Quapaw families were associated with the Quapaw leader Saracen, whose followers reportedly included numerous mixed-heritage Quapaw families living in southeastern Arkansas. This group formed a band of the Quapaw people who were sometimes referred to as the mixed blood band or similar terms.

Following the Treaty of 1824 and the failed Quapaw removal to the Red River region, many members of Saracen's band returned to Arkansas after starvation, flooding, and disease devastated the Quapaw settlements in Louisiana.

Governor George Izard described Saracen's returning band as including many people "of mixed breed".

=== Return to Indian Territory ===
During the late 19th century, many French-Quapaw families living in Arkansas became associated with the group known as the "Absentee Quapaw" or "Arkansas Quapaw". This was because they were party to the Treaty of 1818, 1824, and 1833, but were able to avoid removal on account of their status, and thus were "absent" from the majority of the tribe for a period of about 40 years between the Quapaw removal to Indian Territory, and the early 1880s.

By the early 1880s, federal officials were considering reducing or dissolving the Quapaw reservation due to low population numbers.

In response, Quapaw leadership sought the return of all absentee Quapaw families, including those living in Arkansas in order to strengthen the reservation population and preserve the tribal land base.

An emissary named Alphonsus Valliere was sent to Arkansas in 1883 to encourage Quapaw-French families, including the Dardenne, Cousotte, Ray, Imbeau, and Hunt families, to relocate to the reservation in Indian Territory.

Many of these families relocated between approximately 1883 and 1886. Their return increased the reservation population during the critical years when the reservation was under threat of being lost contributed to the preservation of the Quapaw land base. WPA interviews conducted in Quapaw, Oklahoma during the 1930s documented continued memory of the old Arkansas French-Indian family communities among descendants of families such as the Vallieres and Dardennes.

== See also ==
- Arkansas Creoles
- Arkansas Post
- Quapaw
- Indian removal
- Métis
