= Larue, Arkansas =

- Unincorporated community
- Location within Arkansas Location within the United States
- Coordinates: 36°20′30″N 93°56′46″W
- Country: United States
- State: Arkansas
- County: Benton
- Elevation: 1,161 ft (354 m)
- Time zone: UTC-6 (Central (CST))
  - Summer (DST): UTC-5 (CDT)
- Area code: 479
- GNIS feature ID: 77452

Larue is an unincorporated community in Benton County, Arkansas, United States. Larue was established in the late 19th century as a community for orchard workers. In the 1920s, the community transitioned to an economy based on animal husbandry and grain farming as orchard production declined in the area.

The Coal Gap School, which is listed on the National Register of Historic Places, was built in 1928 to serve the Larue area. The creation of Beaver Lake in the 1960s separated the school from Larue.
