= Marie Francoise Antoinette Petit de Coulange de Vilemont =

First European born in Arkansas

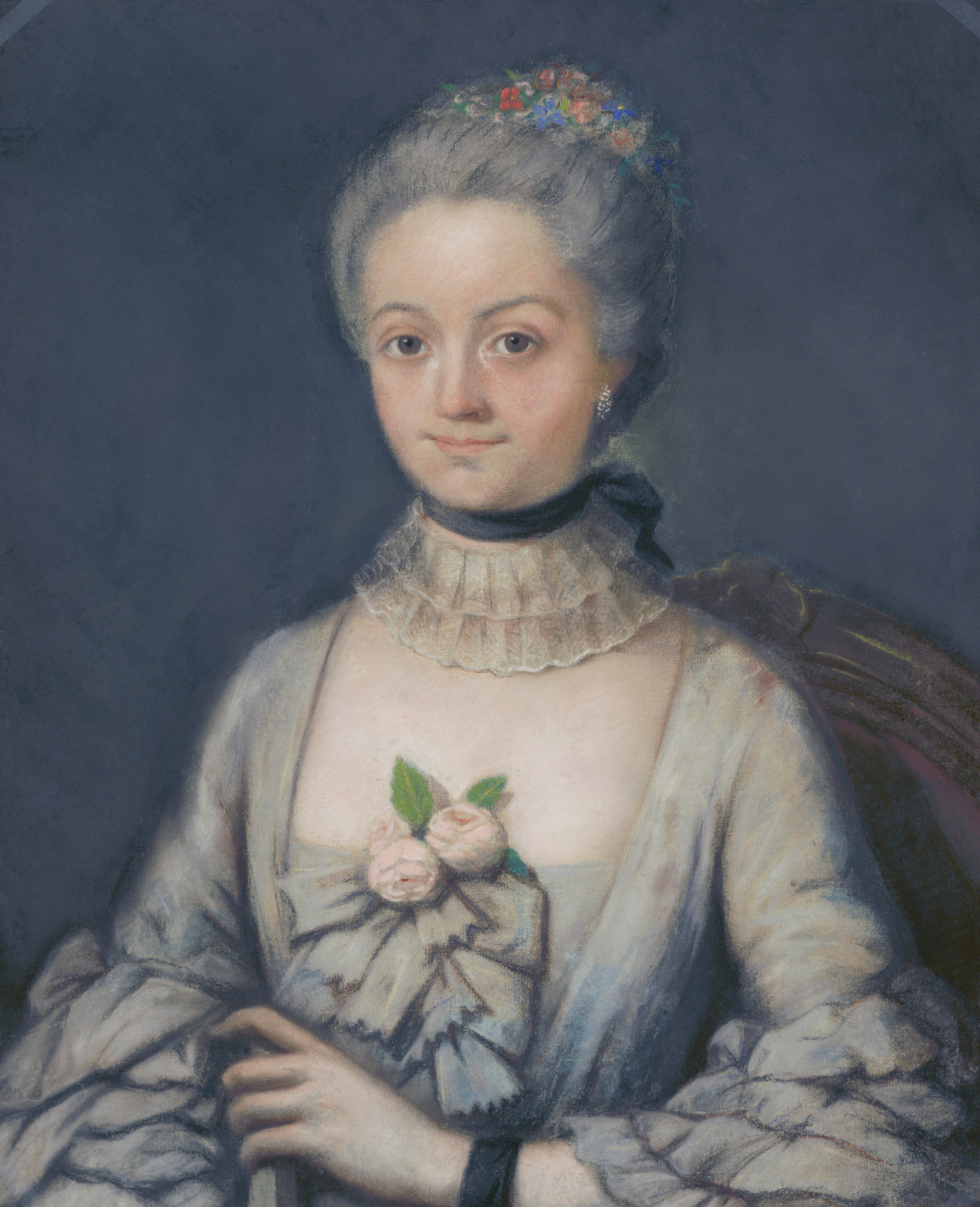
Madame Vincent Guillaume Le Senechal d'Auberville, née Francoise Petit de Levilliers de Coulange (1760–1764)

Marie Françoise Antoinette de Petit de Coulange de Vilemont (September 23, 1732 – 1812) was the first European born in the Arkansas region, specifically at the Arkansas Post. She was born to Pierre Louis Petit de Coulange and Françoise Gallard de Chamilly. She was widowed three times by the age of thirty-seven, and survived by one son, Charles Melchior de Vilemont.

== Family background ==
Marie Françoise Antoinette de Petit de Coulange was born into a military family. Her father, Pierre Louis Petit de Coulange, served as First Ensign in Louisiana under French rule from late 1731 into 1734. De Coulange lived and worked in the Arkansas Post region from 1731 onward, joined by his wife. In the midst of his tenure as First Ensign and Commandant at the Arkansas Post, Marie was born on September 23, 1732. She was the first child of European descent born in the region.

In 1729, under orders by Governor Etienne de Perier, de Coulange made his first voyage into the Arkansas region with a fleet of seventy men. He was sent to defend the existence of French colonial presence in the area from Natchez natives, following their massacre of the few remaining Frenchmen there. The Natchez interrupted and attacked the 1729 fleet, and de Coulange's first attempt to enter the Arkansas region was unsuccessful.

In 1731, de Coulange regrouped his fleet, this time with only twelve men, in order to establish a new, official garrison at the Arkansas Post. The completed garrison consisted of four wooden structures: a 40x16 ft. barracks, a 10x8 ft. prison, a 32x18 ft. house with three rooms and a fireplace, and an 8x10 ft. powder magazine. The barracks was 640 sq. ft., the powder magazine and jail were 80 sq. ft., and the house was 648 sq. ft.. Located in the same site that was formerly occupied by Henri de Tonti, this garrison proved to be the first notable structure at the Arkansas Post. It existed through the Seven Years' War, after which it was destroyed. The garrison was rudimentary in construction, made entirely of local wood and bark. A wood foundation supported vertical posts that held up bark roofing. Since there were only twelve men located at the garrison, they were ordered by the governor not to construct a building for storage, rather opting to store goods in the walls of the barracks.

While Ensign, de Coulange and his fellow Frenchmen were allied with local Quapaw natives against the Chickasaws, who had been threatening French presence; this was the initial reason that de Coulange was sent to the territory in 1729. De Coulange felt threatened by other neighboring native tribes, and in 1736, he organized without his Quapaw allies to attack the Chickasaw by orders of the French government. Ultimately, the battle, which was part of the First Chickasaw War, was a failure for de Coulange and his Frenchmen, resulting in his death.

== Early life ==
Following the death of Pierre Louis Petit de Coulange, Marie Françoise Antoinette Petit de Coulange and her mother relocated to New Orleans. There is little evidence regarding her mother.

== Marriage ==
In 1746 at fourteen years old, Marie Françoise Antoinette de Petit de Coulange married Jean Baptiste Boucher de Monbrun, who died within a year of their union. In either 1748 or 1749, when she was sixteen, she married once again to a man named Guillaume Le Sénécchal d'Auberville, who was chief judge of the superior council of Louisiana. They had two daughters, Marie Louise in 1750 and Céleste Elisabeth in 1752; Marie Louise went on to marry the Spanish Louisiana military commandant Francisco Bouligny. After Le Sénécchal's death and subsequent inheritance, Marie Françoise Antoinette de Petit de Coulange relocated to Versailles, where she then married her third and final husband, Jean Pierre Robert Gerard de Vilemont in 1761, with her name officially becoming Marie Françoise Antoinette de Petit de Coulange de Vilemont.

In the same year (1761), she gave birth to her first son, Charles Melchoir de Vilemont. Three years later in 1764, Marie Françoise Antoinette de Petit de Coulange de Vilemont moved back into the Louisiana territory, with her new husband to follow suit two years later in 1766. Three years after that, in 1769 when Marie was thirty-seven, Jean Pierre Robert Gerard de Vilemont died, leaving her a widow for the third time. She would never again remarry, rather becoming an aristocratic woman as a result of inheriting the wealth of three husbands.

Her son, Charles Melchior de Vilemont, followed in the footsteps of her first husband and become Commandant of the Arkansas Post from July 11, 1794, until the Summer of 1802. During his tenure as Spanish Commandant, the population of the post tripled in size, and was generally described by visitors in a more positive light than in prior years. He inherited her aristocratic status. Unlike his maternal grandfather, Pierre Louis Petit de Coulange, who was Commandant of the Arkansas Post through the French colonial regime, he was appointed as Commandant through the Spanish regime as captain.

== Death ==
Marie Françoise Antoinette de Petit de Coulange de Vilemont died in 1812. She would have been 79 or 80 years old.
