= Glazypeau Mountain =

Mountain in Arkansas, United States

- Location within Arkansas

Highest point
- Elevation: 1,263 ft (385 m)
- Coordinates: 34°36′53.6″N 93°03′12.6″W

Geography
- Location: Garland County

Glazypeau Mountain is a summit in Garland County, in the U.S. state of Arkansas.

Glazypeau is derived from the French "glaise à Paul", referring to a nearby salt lick.
