= Mary John (Marie-Jeanne) =

American former slave (died 1857)

Mary John (c. 1788–1857), originally Marie Jeanne was born into slavery in the province of Louisiana (New Spain). She purchased her freedom in 1840 and then ran a tavern in Arkansas Post, Arkansas, that was recognised for the quality of its cuisine. Unusually for a black woman at that time, her death led to an obituary in the Arkansas Gazette.

== Early years as a slave ==
The records relating to John are incomplete, particularly regarding her early life. From one set of documents Mary John was born between 1785 and 1789 and was sold or passed by inheritance to a number of owners. On 30 July 1806 her then owner, Marie Languedoc sold Marie Jeanne as a slave to Jean Larquier for 800 piastres. Larquier in turn sold her to Colonel James Scull, who bought Marie Jeanne on 12 April 1811, for 800 piasters, the same price as Jean Larquier originally paid for Jeanne. Both sales were duly notified by André Fagot, the Arkansas Notary Public. The 1806 bill of sale is in French, Arkansas Post entered into the United States in October 1804 as a result of the Louisiana Purchase but most residents were French speakers.

Marie Jeanne's name was changed to Mary John under Scull's ownership, the name she used for the rest of her life. While still a slave she was recorded as supervising an "immense banquet" for Independence Day, July 1840, in Pine Bluff, recorded by Judge J. W. Bocage. Miller, in his book, suggested this was a public event and that Scull was possibly managing a large team of men.

== Freedom from slavery ==
A few months after this Independence Day banquet, Mary John got her own independence, when she bought herself out slavery for $800 from Scull. This was on 13 September 1840, with a document witnessed by James and Hews Scull, before an Arkansas County Justice of the Peace. In this document Terence Farrelly and Lewis Refeld were appointed her guardians, enabling her to run a tavern at Arkansas Post. Mary John was described in the document as "a negro woman about fifty years old".

H. W. Halliburton, in his history of Arkansas County published in 1903, wrote that Mary John kept the only tavern in Arkansas County, "which was probably the most celebrated in the State for the perfection of its cuisine." John was listed in the 1850 Census as a black female, 62 years old, born in Arkansas.

== Death ==
Mary John's death was recorded in May 1857, when William Refeld applied for probate, given that she had died intestate. By the time of the 1860 Census, William Refeld was recorded as a hotel keeper in Arkansas Post.

On 6 June 1857, the Arkansas Gazette published an obituary on Mary John, noting she was previously the servant of the now deceased James Scull and his wife. It concluded: "Mary John was the cook — and such a cook. Delmonico, if his life were at stake could not get up such coffee and venison steaks as Mary John did. She was keeping a boarding house at the old Post, at the time of her death, having purchased her freedom some fifteen years ago. She was much respected, and her death is mourned by many, and among them her old mistress, and her master's children." Dorothy Core's assessment in 1978 said: "A black business woman in the first fifty years of American Arkansas was indeed a rarity. The odds against a successful, black business woman of renown in the first fifty years of American Arkansas were astronomical."
