= Glenn R. Conrad =

American historian (1932–2003)

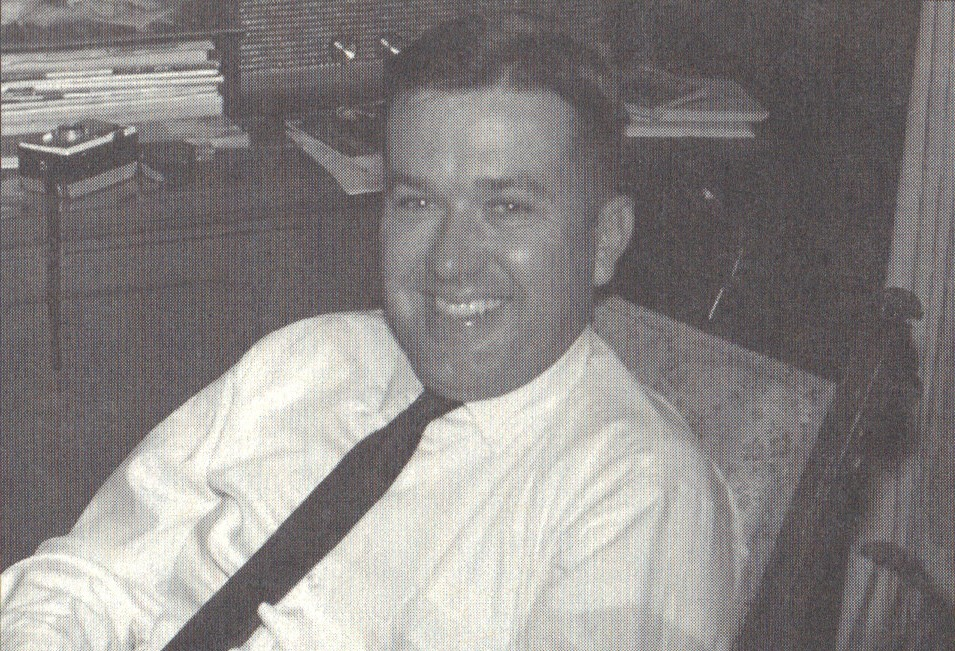
- Glenn R. Conrad in 1967
- Born: Glenn Russell Conrad; September 3, 1932; New Iberia, Louisiana, U.S.
- Died: June 4, 2003 (aged 70); New Iberia, Louisiana, U.S.
- Education: Georgetown University
- Occupations: Historian, author, professor

Glenn Russell Conrad (September 3, 1932 – June 4, 2003) was an American historian, professor, and author. He is known for his research of south Louisiana culture, as well as an expert on archival studies, nineteenth-century European history, and the history of colonial Louisiana. He taught at Southern Arkansas University, Magnolia and the University of Southwestern Louisiana from 1958 until 2003, and serving as the director of the Center of Louisiana Studies at University of Southern Louisiana from 1973 until 2003.

== Early life and education ==
Glenn Conrad was born September 3, 1932, in New Iberia, Louisiana. Conrad attended Georgetown University in Washington, D.C., and received a Bachelor of Science in Foreign Service in 1953, and a Master of Arts in history in 1959. Prior to becoming a historian, he worked as an editor for the Federal Bureau of Investigation (FBI).

== Career ==
He taught at the University of Louisiana at Lafayette (then known as the University of Southwestern Louisiana), where he served as director of the Center for Louisiana Studies from 1973 until 2003. During that time, Conrad developed the center into a self-supporting university press that issued several academic titles each year on Louisiana-related subjects, particularly Louisiana history, but also Louisiana architecture, botany, and poetry, among other topics.

Noted folklorist and linguist Barry Jean Ancelet once said that Conrad "had the remarkable vision many years ago to focus serious scholarly attention on the many layers of Louisiana's history that were neglected by the official story. This included research on the history and culture of the Cajuns and the Louisiana Creole people. It was based on basic and original research, including conducting field interviews and poring over census reports, court records and early journals and newspaper accounts; it made the emerging history come alive with a wealth of interdisciplinary considerations, including music, literature, architecture, cuisine and sociology, among others. Spurred by his efforts . . . much of our once neglected history is now part of the record."

From 1973 to 1993 Conrad served as managing editor of the state academic journal Louisiana History, and he served for many years as secretary-treasurer of the Louisiana Historical Association, which published the journal.

Conrad served as town historian for New Iberia, Louisiana, where he was born and resided for most of his life.

Among other awards, Conrad received the Humanist of the Year award in 2001 from the Louisiana Endowment for the Humanities.

== Works ==
Conrad published over 40 academic articles and over 20 books. A book edited by Conrad, The Cajuns: Essays on Their History and Culture, is considered one of the first serious published works on the Cajun people. He also oversaw the publication of the 20-volume Louisiana Purchase Bicentennial Series and the three-volume A Dictionary of Louisiana Biography.

Among Conrad's books are:

- Conrad, Glenn R.; Lucas, Ray F. (1995). White Gold: A Brief History of the Louisiana Sugar Industry 1795-1995. University of Louisiana at Lafayette. ISBN 094098492X.
- Conrad, Glenn R.; Brasseaux, Carl A. (1994). Crevasse! The 1927 Flood in Acadiana. Center for Louisiana Studies, University of Louisiana at Lafayette. ISBN 0940984881.
- Conrad, Glenn R. (1986). New Iberia: Essays on the Town and Its People (2 ed.). Center for Louisiana Studies, University of Southwestern Louisiana. ISBN 0940984318.
- Conrad, Glenn R., ed. (1983). The Cajuns: Essays on Their History and Culture (3 ed.). University of Louisiana at Lafayette. ISBN 0940984105.
- Conrad, Glenn R., ed. (1978). The Cajuns: Essays on Their History and Culture (2 ed.). Center for Louisiana Studies, University of Southwestern Louisiana. OCLC 4685896.
- The French Experience in Louisiana [as editor] (1995)
- A Bibliography of Scholarly Literature on Colonial Louisiana and New France [with Carl A. Brasseaux] (1992)
- Land Records of the Attakapas District (1990)
- "Gone but Not Forgotten": Records from South Louisiana Cemeteries [with Carl A. Brasseaux] (1983)
- The German Coast: Abstracts of the Civil Records of St. Charles and St. John the Baptist Parish Parishes, 1804-1812 (1981)
- Creed of a Congressman: F. Edward Hébert of Louisiana (1970)

== See also ==
- Center for Louisiana Studies
