= Joseph Bonne =

Early settler of Pine Bluff, Arkansas (born 1793)

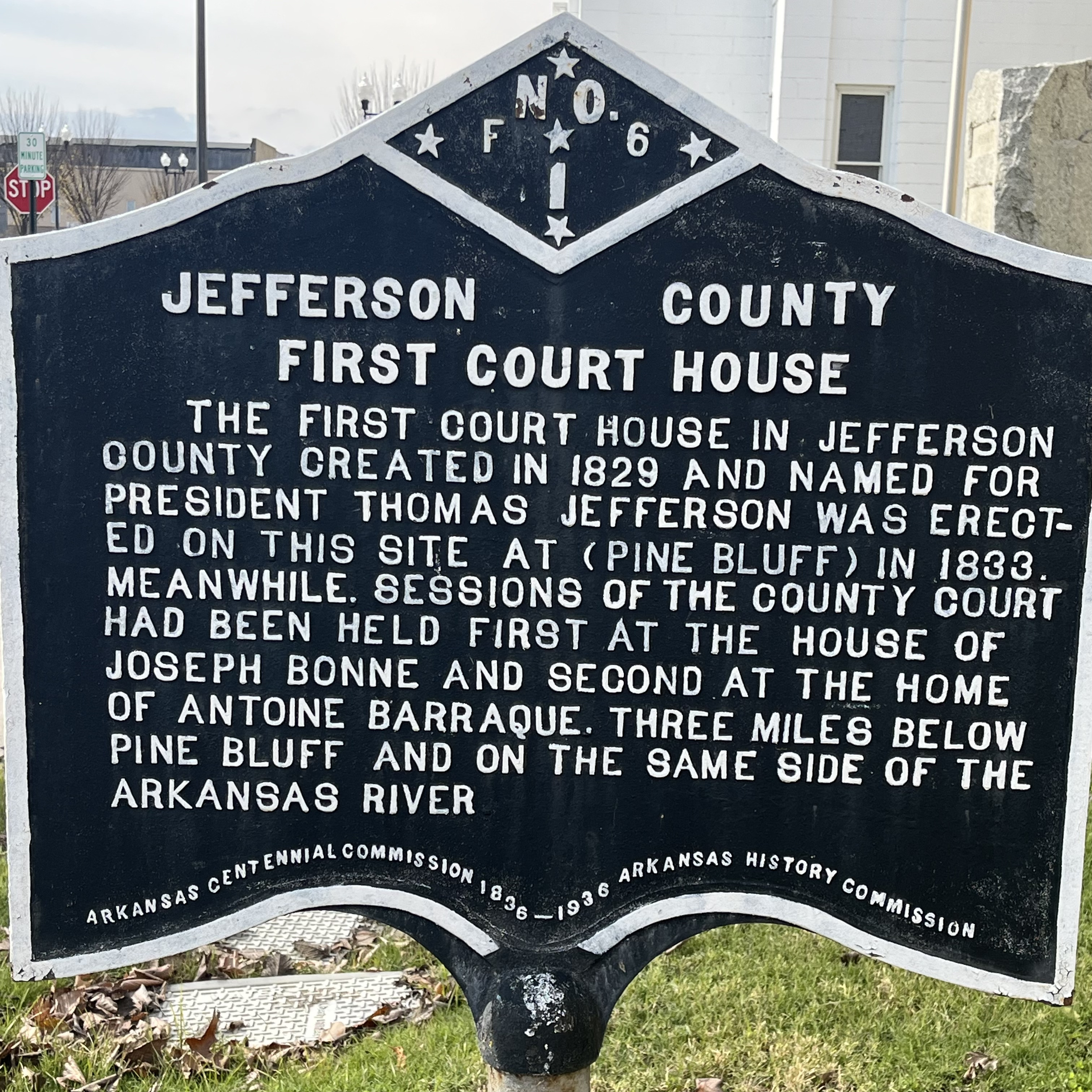
A plaque in Pine Bluff which mentions Bonne

Joseph Bonne or Bone (born 1793) was an early settler of Pine Bluff, Arkansas, of Creole origin. Bonne served as an interpreter to the 1818 treaty between the Quapaw and the United States, and was a recipient of a land grant as a result of the 1824 treaty.

== Ancestry ==
Joseph Bonne was the son of Michel Bonne, a voyageur, and Marie Jean, a woman of Native ancestry. Sources differ on whether Marie Jean was of Quapaw descent. She might have been known also as Marie Louise; alternatively this might have been the name of Joseph's step-mother. Bonne's paternal grandmother was Plains Apache, and his paternal grandfather, Miguel Bona, was a native of San Antonio.

== Early life ==
Minnie Roane Tomlinsson, writing in the Jefferson County Historical Quarterly, reported that Bonne was born "50 miles up the Arkansas River" in 1793, and by 1818 he was living in New Gascony. In 1819, rising flood waters forced him to move, and he eventually settled in what would become Pine Bluff.

== Settlement of Pine Bluff ==
Bonne was one of eleven men of Native ancestry listed by name as land grantees in Article 7 of the 1824 treaty between the Quapaw Nation and the United States; another of these men was Saracen. An account published in the 1870s reports that Bonne was the "first white man" in the area, and was said to be among the group who gave the city the name "Pine Bluff." As other settlers to the region arrived, Bonne sold his stake in what would become the city to a man named John W. Pullen, and the real estate eventually came into the possession of "Generals James and Yell." After selling the land, Bonne was said to have operated the fledgling town's first tavern. Tomlinsson states that the first court in Jefferson County was held in Bonne's log cabin.
