= L'Eau Frais Creek =

Coordinates: 34.1521°N 92.8712°W

L'Eau Frais Creek is an unincorporated community in Clark County, Dallas County, and Hot Spring County, in the U.S. state of Arkansas. A variant name is Low Freight Creek.

The name is derived from the French meaning "cold water".
