= Lapile, Arkansas =

Unincorporated community in Arkansas, U.S.

Coordinates: 33°05′36″N 92°16′08″W

Lapile is an unincorporated community in Union County, in the U.S. state of Arkansas.

== History ==
A post office was established at Lapile in 1877, and remained in operation until it was discontinued in 1955. The name Lapile is derived from French meaning "the pier."
