= Bayou des Arc =

River in Arkansas, U.S.

Coordinates: 35°0′18″N 91°29′51″W

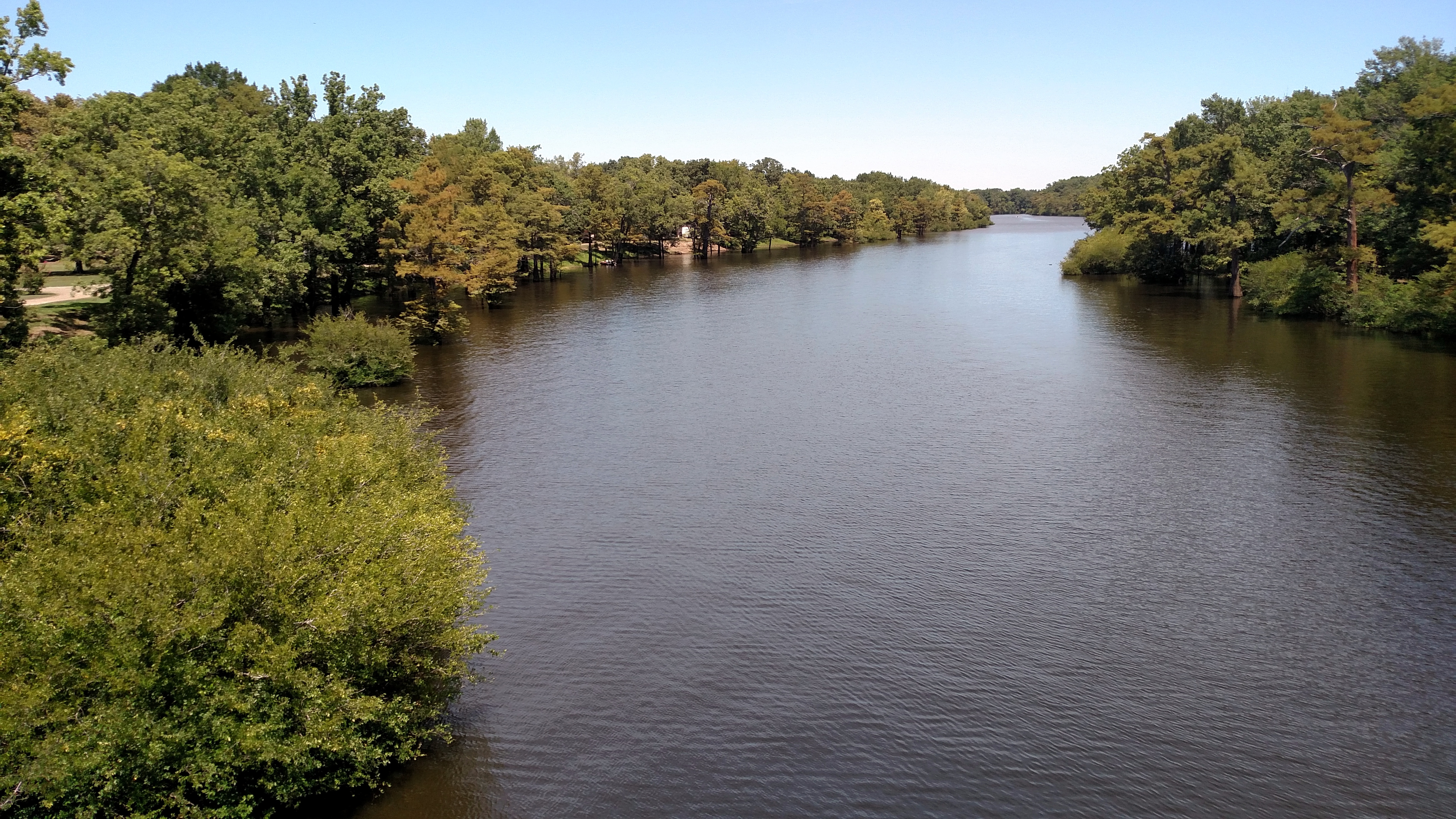

Location
- Country: United States
- State: Arkansas
- City: Des Arc

Physical characteristics
- Source: Arkansas Delta
  - location: White County, Arkansas
- Mouth: White River
  - location: Prairie County, Arkansas
- Discharge
  - location: North of the City of Des Arc

Basin features
- River system: White River watershed
- Tributaries
  - left: Bear Creek, White Creek, Big Cypress Bayou (Wetland)
  - right: Long Branch, White Oak Creek, Dogwood Creek, Hog Thief Creek

Bayou des Arc is a 74-mile-long (119 km) river in Arkansas, United States of America. It is a tributary of the White River, into which it flows near the city of Des Arc in Prairie County, Arkansas. It rises in northwest White County, Arkansas, near the town of Rose Bud.
