= Aurelle, Arkansas =

- Unincorporated community
- Location within Arkansas Location within the United States
- Coordinates: 33°02′53″N 92°24′21″W
- Country: United States
- State: Arkansas
- County: Union
- Elevation: 217 ft (66 m)
- Time zone: UTC-6 (Central (CST))
  - Summer (DST): UTC-5 (CDT)
- Area code: 870
- GNIS feature ID: 57293

Aurelle is an unincorporated community in Union County, Arkansas, United States. Aurelle is located at the end of a paved road 5 miles (8.0 km) south-southwest of Strong.
