= Coal Gap School =

- U.S. National Register of Historic Places
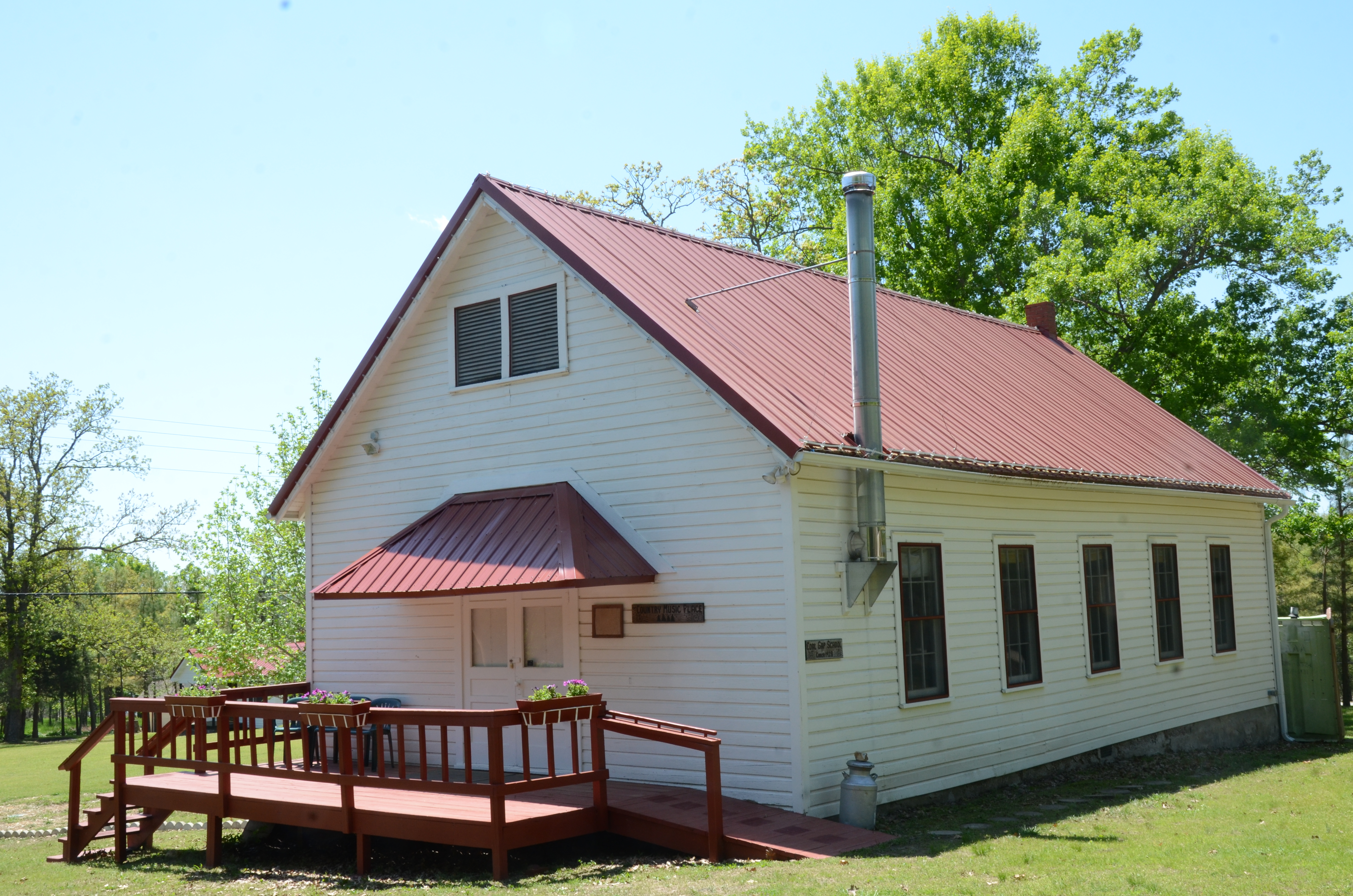

- Location within Arkansas Location within the United States
- Nearest city: Garfield, Arkansas
- Coordinates: 36°21′56″N 93°55′27″W
- Area: 2 acres (0.81 ha)
- Architectural style: Bungalow/craftsman
- MPS: Public Schools in the Ozarks MPS
- NRHP reference No.: 92001123
- Added to NRHP: September 4, 1992

The Coal Gap School is a historic school building located near Garfield, Arkansas. The wood-frame school was built in 1928 to serve Benton County School District 105. The school served the rural area around the Glade community; it was built during a period of economic transition for the area, which had historically been an orchard farming community but was turning to grain farming and animal husbandry. In the 1960s, the creation of Beaver Lake separated the school from areas across the White River.

The origin of Coal Gap School is unknown but the Benton County school supervisor's office records indicated that directors are listed as early as 1887. Land for the school was given for the price of one dollar by Edd Jennings to be used as a school, according to courthouse deeds. Years ago, a two-story version, was moved several yards south where it became a barn. The second floor never became the lodge that was intended.

On January 20, 1949, both Coal Gap and Garfield agreed to dissolve Coal Gap School District No. 105 and annex it to the Garfield School District No. 114. Less than two months later, on March 5, 1949, the Garfield School District was dissolved and annexed to Rogers School District No. 30. Junior and senior high students from Glade and Garfield were to be bused into Rogers and the elementary grades remained in Garfield Schools.

The school house was the center of the community and with its closing, students traveled through Prairie Creek to go to Rogers Schools, but as Beaver Lake rose the route was changed and the students rode to Garfield and then to Rogers to attend school. Because it was so far, the students were dismissed an hour early to make the long trip home.

Coal Gap School was added to the National Register of Historic Places on September 4, 1992.

== See also ==
- National Register of Historic Places listings in Benton County, Arkansas
