= National Register of Historic Places listings in Rock Hill, South Carolina =

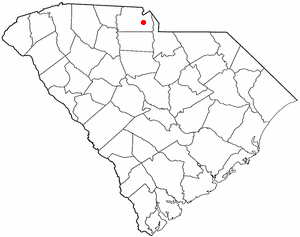
Location of Rock Hill in South Carolina

Rock Hill, South Carolina, United States, has 28 properties and districts listed on the National Register of Historic Places.

The locations of National Register properties and districts for which the latitude and longitude coordinates are included below may be seen on a map.

This National Park Service list is complete through NPS recent listings posted August 7, 2026.

== Current listings ==
	Name on the Register	Image	Date listed	Location	City or town	Description
1	Afro-American Insurance Company Building	Afro-American Insurance Company Building	June 10, 1992 (#92000651)	558 S. Dave Lyle Boulevard; 34°55′19″N 81°02′09″W	Rock Hill	
2	Anderson House	Anderson House	May 13, 1982 (#82003908)	227 Oakland Ave. 34°55′54″N 81°01′34″W	Rock Hill	Designed by architect George Franklin Barber
3	Bleachery Water Treatment Plant	Bleachery Water Treatment Plant	March 6, 2008 (#08000154)	Stewart Ave. 34°56′06″N 81°01′53″W	Rock Hill	
4	Catawba Rosenwald School	Catawba Rosenwald School	July 3, 2013 (#13000465)	3071 S.. Anderson Rd; 34°54′43″N 80°58′35″W	Rock Hill	
5	Charlotte Avenue-Aiken Avenue Historic District	Charlotte Avenue-Aiken Avenue Historic District	June 10, 1992 (#92000659)	Roughly Aiken Ave. from College Ave. to Charlotte Ave. and Charlotte from Aiken to Union Ave. 34°56′09″N 81°01′28″W	Rock Hill	
6	Ebenezer Academy	Ebenezer Academy	August 16, 1977 (#77001234)	2132 Ebenezer Rd. 34°58′01″N 81°03′06″W	Rock Hill	
7	Dr. W.W. and Mary Fennell House		October 11, 2022 (#100008250)	334 North Confederate Ave. 34°55′35″N 81°01′08″W	Rock Hill	
8	First Presbyterian Church	First Presbyterian Church	June 10, 1992 (#92000653)	234 E. Main St. 34°55′25″N 81°01′31″W	Rock Hill	
9	Hermon Presbyterian Church	Hermon Presbyterian Church	June 10, 1992 (#92000652)	446 Dave Lyle Boulevard; 34°55′24″N 81°02′03″W	Rock Hill	
10	Highland Park Manufacturing Plant and Cotton Oil Complex	Highland Park Manufacturing Plant and Cotton Oil Complex	June 10, 1992 (#92000655)	869 Standard St. and 732 and 737 E. White St. 34°55′15″N 81°00′42″W	Rock Hill	
11	Laurelwood Cemetery	Laurelwood Cemetery	July 31, 2008 (#08000746)	Bordered by Laurel, W. White, Stewart, and W. Main Sts. 34°55′55″N 81°01′59″W	Rock Hill	
12	Marion Street Area Historic District	Marion Street Area Historic District	June 10, 1992 (#92000654)	Roughly Marion St. from Hampton St. to Center St. and Center from State St. to Marion; 34°55′13″N 81°01′43″W	Rock Hill	
13	McCorkle-Fewell-Long House	McCorkle-Fewell-Long House	August 21, 1980 (#80003715)	639 College Ave. 34°56′30″N 81°01′36″W	Rock Hill	
14	Mount Prospect Baptist Church	Mount Prospect Baptist Church	June 10, 1992 (#92000656)	339 W. Black St. 34°55′45″N 81°02′08″W	Rock Hill	
15	Nation Ford Fish Weir	Nation Ford Fish Weir	March 1, 2007 (#00000595)	In the Catawba River approximately 1200 feet upstream from the Nation Ford railroad trestle 34°57′40″N 80°57′20″W	Rock Hill	
16	People's National Bank Building	People's National Bank Building	March 25, 1999 (#99000396)	131-133 E. Main St. 34°55′32″N 81°01′37″W	Rock Hill	
17	Reid Street-North Confederate Avenue Area Historic District	Reid Street-North Confederate Avenue Area Historic District	June 10, 1992 (#92000657)	Roughly Reid St. and N. Confederate Ave. between E. Main St. and E. White St. 34°55′26″N 81°01′19″W	Rock Hill	
18	Rock Hill Body Company	Rock Hill Body Company	March 6, 2008 (#08000155)	601 W. Main St. 34°55′55″N 81°02′11″W	Rock Hill	
19	Rock Hill Cotton Factory	Rock Hill Cotton Factory	June 10, 1992 (#92000658)	215 Chatham St.; also 130 W. White St. 34°55′42″N 81°01′39″W	Rock Hill	130 White represents a boundary increase of March 6, 2008
20	Rock Hill Downtown Historic District	Rock Hill Downtown Historic District	June 24, 1991 (#91000828)	Roughly S. Oakland Ave. from south of Peoples Pl. to E. Main St. 34°55′31″N 81°01′30″W	Rock Hill	
21	Rock Hill Printing and Finishing Company		February 5, 2013 (#12001264)	400 W. White St. 34°55′51″N 81°01′49″W	Rock Hill	
22	Stokes-Mayfield House	Stokes-Mayfield House	May 17, 1984 (#84002100)	353 Oakland Ave. 34°56′03″N 81°01′40″W	Rock Hill	
23	R.L. and Annie Sturgis House		January 13, 2022 (#100007302)	522 East Main St. 34°55′17″N 81°01′11″W	Rock Hill	
24	Tillman Hall	Tillman Hall	December 2, 1977 (#77001235)	Oakland Ave. on the Winthrop College campus 34°56′18″N 81°01′47″W	Rock Hill	
25	US Post Office and Courthouse	US Post Office and Courthouse	January 21, 1988 (#87002523)	102 Main St. 34°55′30″N 81°01′33″W	Rock Hill	
26	White House	White House	December 3, 1969 (#69000176)	258 E. White St. 34°55′33″N 81°01′18″W	Rock Hill	
27	Winthrop College Historic District	Winthrop College Historic District	April 23, 1987 (#86003469)	Along Oakland Ave. between Cherry Rd. and Stewart Ave. on the Winthrop College campus 34°56′22″N 81°01′48″W	Rock Hill	
28	Withers Building	Withers Building	August 20, 1981 (#81000571)	Oakland Ave. 34°50′28″N 81°01′42″W	Rock Hill	

== See also ==
- National Register of Historic Places listings in York County, South Carolina
