= Winthrop College Historic District =

Historic district in South Carolina, United States

- U.S. National Register of Historic Places
- U.S. Historic district
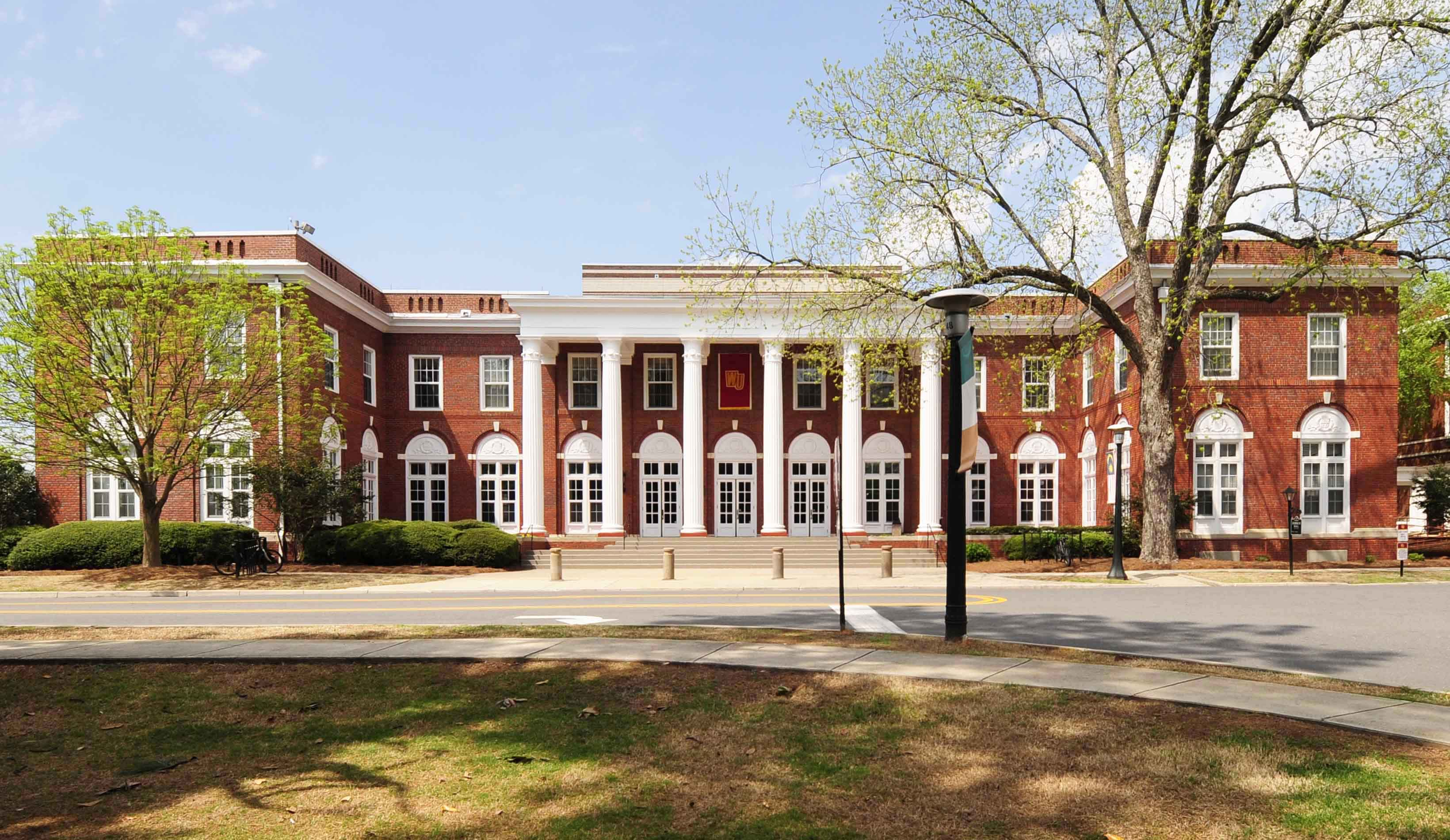
- Johnson Hall, Winthrop College Historic District, April 2012

- Location within South Carolina Location within the United States
- Location: Along Oakland Ave. between Cherry Rd. and Stewart Ave. on the Winthrop College campus, Rock Hill, South Carolina
- Coordinates: 34°56′22″N 81°1′48″W
- Area: 59.4 acres (24.0 ha)
- Architect: Bruce & Morgan; Et al.
- Architectural style: Classical Revival, Colonial Revival, Neo-Georgian
- NRHP reference No.: 86003469
- Added to NRHP: April 23, 1987

Winthrop College Historic District is a national historic district located on the campus of Winthrop University at Rock Hill, South Carolina. It encompasses 17 contributing buildings and 1 contributing structure constructed between 1894 and 1943. Architectural styles represented include Gothic Revival, Richardsonian Romanesque, Classical Revival, and Colonial Revival. Notable buildings include the separately listed Tillman Hall and Withers Building, as well as Alumni House, Phelps Dormitory, Thurmond Building, Byrnes Auditorium, Johnson Hall, and the President's Residence.

It was listed on the National Register of Historic Places in 1987.
