= Ostrow Textile Company =

Former textile company

- Industry: Textiles
- Founded: 1912; 114 years ago in New York City
- Defunct: 2005
- Fate: Bankruptcy
- Headquarters: Rock Hill, South Carolina, United States

The Ostrow Textile Company was founded in 1912 in New York City. It moved to Charlotte, North Carolina in 1963, and to Rock Hill, South Carolina in 1968. It finally went bankrupt in 2005. The company operated Plej's textile mill outlets and was a distributor of linens and domestics.

== See also ==
- Rock Hill Cotton Factory: An Ostrow Textile Mill
