= Thomas James Reddy =

American poet (1945–2019)

"T.J." Reddy
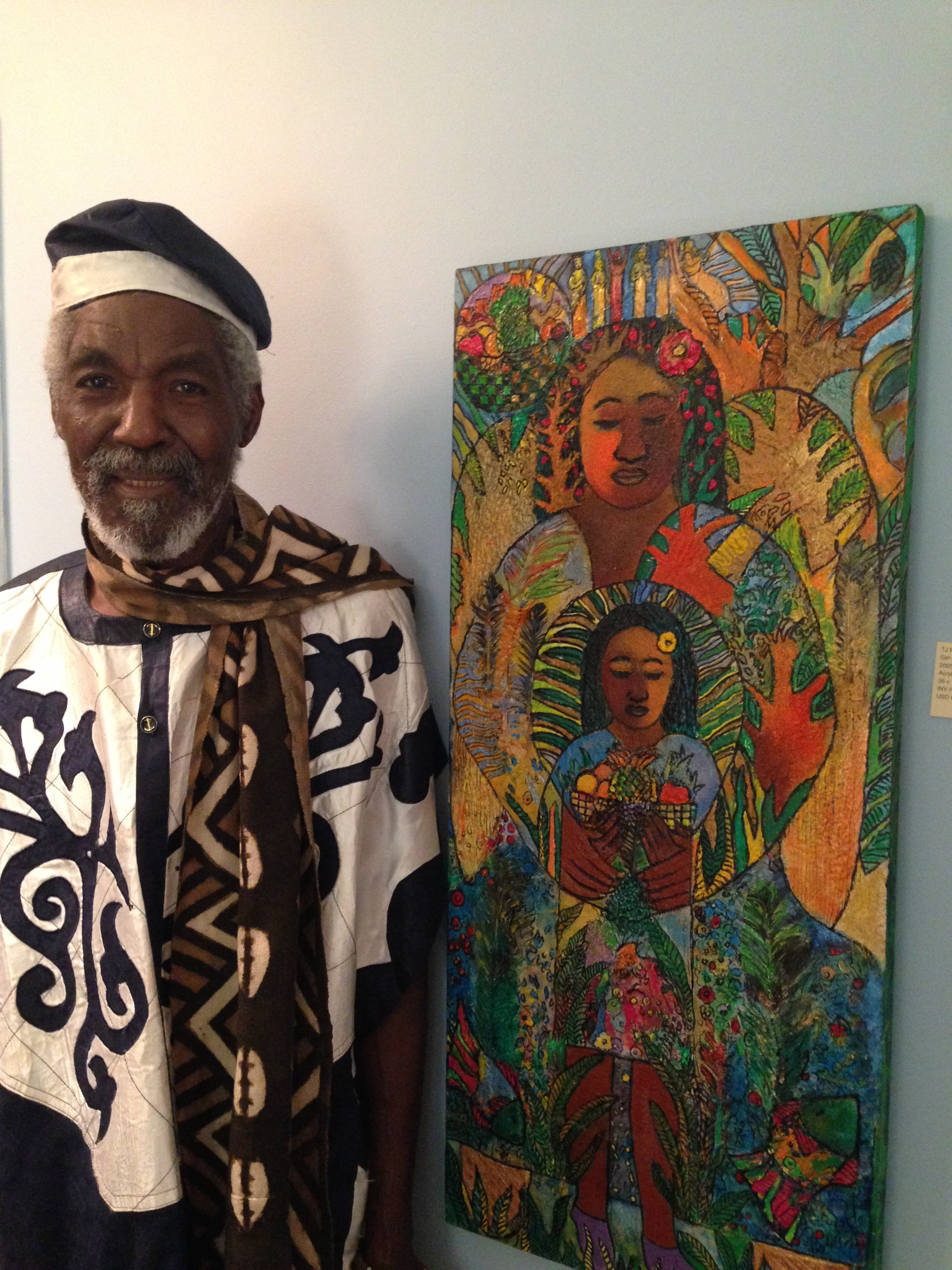
- Artist TJ Reddy in Charlotte, N.C
- Born: Thomas James Reddy; 8 June 1945; Savannah, Georgia, United States
- Died: 31 March 2019 (aged 73); Charlotte, North Carolina, United States
- Occupations: Artist; Activist; Poet; Musician; Entrepreneur
- Spouse(s): Marriage Vicky Minar, 1968

Thomas James "T. J." Reddy (6 August 1945 – 31 March 2019) was an American artist, poet, activist, and musician.

== Early life ==
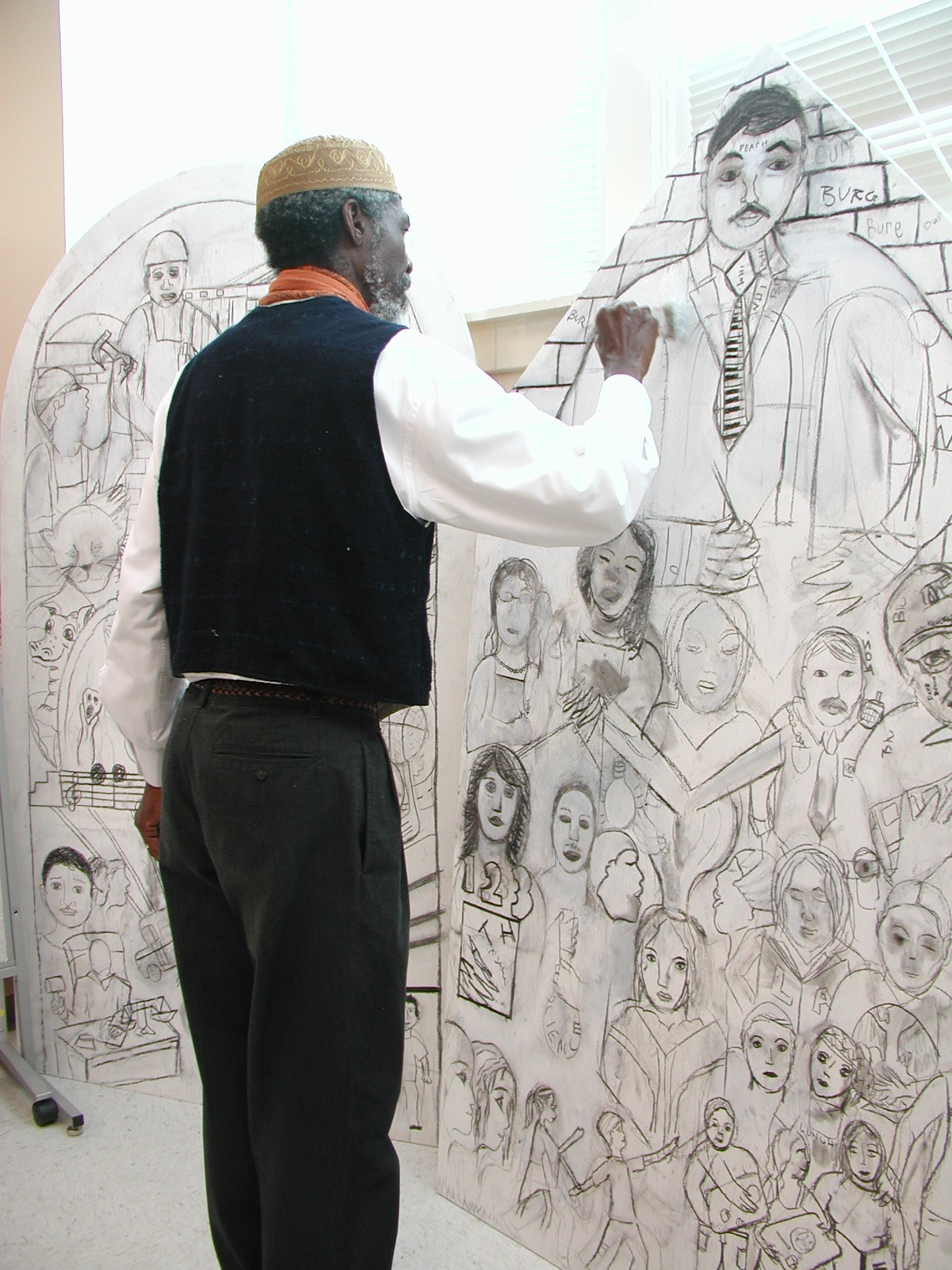
Artist T. J. Reddy works on a mural in Charlotte, North Carolina.

Reddy was born in Savannah, Georgia. During his childhood, black children were barred from public libraries, so his school principal turned her house in to a library which he visited often as a passionate reader. His family moved to New York City when he was 14. He moved to Charlotte in 1964 to study at Johnson C. Smith University and then transferred to the University of North Carolina at Charlotte where he helped to found the Black Student Union and the African and Afro-American Studies Department. During the 1960s he was active in Civil Rights activities, protesting the Vietnam War and opposing intensive military draft activities in the black community. Reddy repeatedly visited military recruiting centers, wearing different disguises each time, and handed out antiwar flyers. Reddy received his B.A. in history from the University of North Carolina at Charlotte in 1974 and a master's degree in education from the same university three years later. In the late 1980s, he studied painting in the Master's of Fine Arts program at Winthrop University in Rock Hill, South Carolina.

== Career ==
During the time Reddy was actively engaged in the Civil Rights Movement, he and two other African-American activists, James Grant and Charles Parker, visited the Lazy B horse stables. The three had been turned away from the stables because of the color of their skin. One year later, the trio were charged by the federal government in connection with a fire which killed fourteen horses. During the 1972 trial, they were labeled as political terrorists and became known as the Charlotte Three. Reddy was sentenced to 20 years in prison. In 1974, the two key witnesses "revealed that the federal government had paid them $4,000 each as a "relocation fee" following their testimony against the accused." A series of appeals, all the way to the U.S. Supreme Court, were denied. In 1979, North Carolina Governor Jim Hunt commuted the sentences and Reddy was paroled. New York Times columnist Tom Wicker wrote that it was "one more of those vengeful miscarriages of justice by which comfortable society attempted to label urban unrest, racial disorders ... and anti-war activity as the work of agitators and terrorists." A collection of correspondence, legal documents and other material about this period of Reddy's life are archived in The J. Murrey Atkins Library Special Collections at the University of North Carolina at Charlotte.

While a student the University of North Carolina at Charlotte, Reddy was a poetry consultant and associate editor of arts magazine Three. In 1969, he won the LeGette Blythe Creative Writing Award. Among the publications in which his poetry appears are the Red Clay Reader (1969), Southern Poetry Review (1970), A Galaxy of Black Writing (1971), Hyperion Journal (1975), Miscellany (1974). His poetry has been collected in two books: Less Than a Score, But a Point (Random House's Vintage Books, 1974) and Poems in One Part Harmony (Carolina Wren, 1980). Reddy often reads the poetry of Beat poet Bob Kaufman, his favorite poet. Reddy has been inspired by French artist Marc Chagall, who is also a painter and poet.

Reddy's artwork as a Social Realist painter that reflect the traditions of the Harlem Renaissance are held in permanent collections at the Tweed Museum of Art in Duluth, Minnesota and the University of North Carolina at Charlotte's J. Murrey Atkins Library. "Reddy's mixed media paintings largely use acrylics and he has added natural materials, such as paper, sand, wood, fabric and clay. He is also known for his murals and public art projects. "His work is inspired by travels throughout the Caribbean and seacoast islands of the southern United States, and by the migrations of people of African and Caribbean descent to the Americas," according to the University of North Carolina at Charlotte Africana Studies Department where Reddy was a visiting artist in 2008–2009. "His paintings are richly textured two-dimensional narratives with a spiritual and universal quality that expresses a profound appreciation for culture, which he defines as shared human values."

His work was on display in a 2013 exhibit on the Civil Rights Movement at the Levine Museum of the New South in Charlotte, N.C. A solo exhibition of his work was held in 2014 at the St. Helena (SC). York W. Bailey Museum at Penn Center. Reddy's murals continue to adorn walls in around Charlotte, his longtime home. He was commissioned to paint "Remembrances of Charlotte's Second Ward: Brooklyn and Blue Heaven" at the Charlotte Convention Center. In fact, the convention center was built in what had been a traditionally African-American neighborhood. Reddy's mural depicts the values and lives of the African Americans who once lived at that very site.

Reddy's work includes many series, reflecting his activism and attunement to deep historical, cultural trends. His "Psychological Castration Series," 15 paintings produced in the early 2000s were a reaction to the Tuskegee Syphilis Experiments conducted between 1932 and 1972 in Alabama. Under the pretext of free health care by the U.S. Public Health Services, syphilis in African-American men was untreated to study the course of the disease. Another series, reflects the male archetypes explored by Swiss psychiatrist Carl Gustav Jung: the King, the Lover, the Warrior and the Magician.

Among the instruments that Reddy plays in performances is the kalimba, an ancient African instrument, that the artist has said directs him on an subconscious level. At performance in Charlotte, North Carolina, in April 2017, Reddy explained the connectivity of his art, poetry and music. "When you look at my paintings, I want you to sense the music, the lyrics in it."

During the summer of 2017, the Projective Eye Gallery at the University of North Carolina at Charlotte presented a retrospective of Reddy's life of creativity titled "Everything is Everything." "The exhibition includes imagery from many different bodies of work – King Warrior Magician Lover, Blues Men and Women, Scenes for the Teacher, Family Portraits, Havoc in Haiti, Savanah Scenes, poetry books, and papers – all made during a courageous life triumphant in its affirmations."

"There are four magic ingredients in every TJ Reddy painting: color, symbolism, narrative, and transformation. His work is often categorized as a kind of social realism; a better description may be a social surrealist, with a propensity towards nature and narrative."

Five decades into his creative endeavors, Reddy is still producing new works. "There are more works in progress – subjects of domestic violence and abuse, jazz, and sculpture," he said. "Where I go from here is not a foregone conclusion. It is all, from beginning to end, still and yet a vision within the scope of the all, the concept of everything is everything, uniquely and irrevocably intertwined and combined into creative resolve and life sustenance."

== Accomplishments ==
- From 1967 to 1969: Resident Manager & Project Director, Charlotte Urban Ministry's Tenth Street Community Youth Center
- From 1969 to 1972: Writer for the Charlotte Observer.
- From 1978 to 1979: North Carolina Arts Coalition
- 1979: Afro-American Cultural Center in Charlotte
- From 1980 to 1981: Free Lance Artists
- From 1982: Owner Operator of the Ready Art Shoppe

== Publications ==
Reddy's poetry is included in several publications:

- The Red Clay Reader (1969)
- Southern Poetry Review (1970)
- A Galaxy of Black Writing (1971)
- The Hyperion Journal (1975)
- Miscellany (1974)
- Eleven Charlotte Poets (1971).

Reddy has published two books of poetry:

- Less Than a Score, But a Point (1974)
- Poems in One Part Harmony (1979).

Consultant and coordinator of various art publications and curricula:

- Co-editor of Aim, A Community Arts publication (1970)
- Co-author and co-director of "The Highlights of our Heritage
- Presenter of African history at Johnson C. Smith University (1971)

== Selected exhibits ==
- 1991: Spirit Square, First Union Gallery, Charlotte, North Carolina
- 1992: Front Gallery and Community Arts Council, Asheville, North Carolina
- 1992: Randall Gallery, Wilmington, North Carolina
- 1992: African American Atelier Gallery, Greensboro, North Carolina
- 1993: Dana Gallery, Loyola University, New Orleans, Louisiana
- 1994: Josten's Learning National Conference of Black Educators, Los Angeles, California
- 1994: National Association of Black Supervisors and Educators (NABSE) conference, Houston, Texas and Los Angeles, California
- 1995: Elon College Gallery of Art, Elon College, North Carolina
- 2000: Shades of Diversity, Cape Fear Studio, Fayetteville, North Carolina
- 2001: Lincoln Arts Cultural Center, Lincolnton, North Carolina
- 2002: Tracing Your Family History, Museum of the New South, Charlotte, North Carolina
- 2000: University of North Carolina at Charlotte, Rowe Art Gallery
- 2000: Afro-American Cultural Center, Charlotte, North Carolina
- 2001: St. Joseph's Historic Foundation, Hayti Heritage Center, Lyda Moore Merrick Gallery, Durham, North Carolina
- 2013: Civil Rights Exhibit, Levine Center for the New South, Charlotte, North Carolina
- 2014: Solo exhibition, York W. Bailey Museum at Penn Center, St. Helena, South Carolina
- 2017: TJ Reddy: Everything is Everything, The Projective Eye Gallery, University of North Carolina at Charlotte, Charlotte, North Carolina

== Awards ==
- Recipient of the Kwanja Award for Creativity (1978)
- Recipient of the North Carolina Conference of Black Studies Service Award.
