= Rock Hill Printing and Finishing Company =

- U.S. National Register of Historic Places
- Location within South Carolina Location within the United States
- Location: 400 W. White St., Rock Hill, South Carolina
- Coordinates: 34°55′51″N 81°1′49″W
- NRHP reference No.: 12001264
- Added to NRHP: February 5, 2013

The Rock Hill Printing and Finish Company, also known locally as The Bleachery is a historic textile processing facility at 400 West White Street in downtown Rock Hill, South Carolina. The complex consists of six buildings dating as far back as 1925, as well as a reservoir, and employed nearly 5,000 workers at its height in 1965.

The complex was listed on the National Register of Historic Places in 2008. It includes the previously-listed Bleachery Water Treatment Plant.

== See also ==
- National Register of Historic Places listings in Rock Hill, South Carolina
