= Charlotte Three =

The Charlotte Three, consisting of T.J. Reddy, James Grant, and Charles Parker, were a group of men arrested and convicted in Charlotte, North Carolina, for the burning of Lazy B Stables, a horse stable. The burning took place on September 24, 1968, one year after Lazy B Stables was integrated. All three men were arrested and implicated in the arson in December 1971, a full three years after the incident. The men were eventually convicted for their presumed actions, and were unsuccessful in having their appeals accepted, with the Supreme Court rejecting their motions. They were all well known radical activists in Charlotte and some people claimed their arrest was aimed at stopping their political motives. Many observers believed that this case was a representation of the still heavily racist Southern United States of the 1970s, and the various underhanded methods prosecutors were willing to utilize to obtain convictions against African Americans. The Charlotte Three were victims in the eyes of some, of an American South that was still reeling from widespread integration and general mistrust in Black affairs. The men were held against their will incorrectly not for crimes that they did not commit, but because of the social change they worked hard to attain. Finally, in 1979, North Carolina Jim Hunt commuted all three men's sentences after a vigorous campaign by state, national, and international activists on their behalf.

== Charlotte ==
Charlotte, North Carolina had a reputation as a forward-thinking city in that it wasn't supposed to have the same racial discrimination that the cities in the Deep South had. Charlotte was called a "New South city" but many of its residents still harbored the same racial discrimination, and "clung to Jim Crow segregation" as strongly as residents of Mobile, Alabama and Jackson, Mississippi, stereotypical anti-black cities. African American dissent towards racism was however very prevalent in Charlotte, as the landmark case Brown v. Board of Education arose from a school district around Charlotte, and Reginald Hawkins spearheaded protests against segregation in the cities public and private institutions. When residents in Charlotte in January 1965 filed the court case Swann v. Charlotte-Mecklenburg Board of Education, the car of civil rights leader "Julius Chambers was blown to bits" and a year later, "bombs exploded at the homes of four more civil rights leaders".

== Biographical background ==
One of the residents of Charlotte who had experienced much racial discrimination in his lifetime was T.J. Reddy, who was enrolled in the University of North Carolina at Charlotte. T.J. had been a poet and playwright who used his talents to help him pursue his goal of being an urban activist. He was with his girlfriend Vicky Minar, when he "happened upon a particularly humiliating experience of racial injustice" at the Lazy B Stables. In September 1967, Reddy, his girlfriend, and a group of friends went to Lazy B to enjoy their free time by horseback riding. When the group arrived at the stable, they were rejected from being able to ride since they were black. Since Reddy did not want to make a scene, he decided to leave and not do anything about the social injustice he just encountered.

After "following traditional protest strategies", the group returned mixed, with whites and blacks, and were allowed to ride the horses the next day. Reddy was a man who did not like to be treated unfairly or in a derogatory manner, as evidenced by his poetry "ain't nothing funny bout a cracker/calling me a n*****". However, he would not seek to create fights when unnecessary, as he liked to "keep his nose/just above" implying that he would not resort to arguments when the matter was cleared. Charles Parker, another black man who accompanied Reddy to the stable, was able to ride in public while being watched by the media, thus Reddy believed the matter to be closed. Reddy left the incident because in his mind; "management had a change of heart and was willing to allow black people to ride". Parker had been an honors student at the University of North Carolina at Charlotte and was engaged in antiwar activism through his clubs and activities, and was linked to the movement of "black consciousness".

Another Civil Rights activist who was charged and convicted in the Lazy B Stables case was Dr. James Earl Grant, a dedicated activist against racial discrimination. Though Grant was from Hartford, Connecticut and received his doctorate degree from Penn State, he was very active in the South's racial playing field, especially that of North Carolina's. On May 11, 1970, three white males murdered a black man, Henry Marrow, a father of three children who lived in Oxford, North Carolina. When news spread that Henry had been murdered, Blacks from across the country, along with Grant, decided they were fed up and organized protests. Most wanted to obtain justice through the tried and true legal system, however a group of "black Vietnam veterans" took matters into their own hands and decided to bomb white businesses in Oxford. Neither Grant nor Reddy were involved in the acts of violence against the white owned businesses, but had their fates sealed when a police officer decided to pull over a car driven by two African Americans while exiting Oxford.

== Alfred Hood and David Washington ==
On May 15, 1970, police officers in Oxford, NC arrested Alfred Hood and David Washington for possessing "seven sticks of dynamite, two rifles, and a pistol". The two were friends affiliated with James Grant and told authorities later that Grant had told the two to drive up to Charlotte with their supplies. The City Manager of Charlotte, Ragland, remembered Grant as someone who "was an expert in starting fires…he could start a fire in a rainstorm". Hood and Washington were subsequently jailed for possessing such deadly weapons, however after a short period of time, the two "jumped bail, and fled to Canada" where they were eventually returned on warrants. When the two were apprehended a second time, they decided to cut a deal with the prosecutor that was perceived in the black community as indicative of the social climate of the time period. The men had their general living expenditures paid for, and after their testimony, would be relocated completely all on the government's dime.

What Hood and Washington offered for this unique package was the ability to bring in one of the most influential leaders for the movement of reducing racism, James Grant. They testified in April 1972 that Grant had "encouraged them to skip bond" and even helped them "to cross the border into Canada" so that the two could not be extradited back to the United States. The prosecutor had believed that Grant had "trained these little kids…they were the ones doing the big stuff" while Grant was able to sit "behind the scenes". Grant ended up being convicted of conspiracy and helping out fugitives, and was sentenced to ten years in a federal penitentiary.

Since the prosecutor wanted more from Hood and Washington, he pressed them further, and allegedly started to offer the two men cash for their support in bringing justice to the Charlotte Three for their presumed role in the burning of Lazy B Stables. Assistant Attorney General Robert C. Mardian "approved a deal giving Hood and Washington cash payments of four thousand dollars each" which was to help persuade the two men to say what the prosecutor wanted to hear. What the prosecutor wanted was to be able obtain a conviction of the Charlotte Three who were all civil rights leaders and proponents for the end of racism in Charlotte. The three were indicted in January 1972 and this set off a racial firestorm.

The prosecutor however denies this claim and rather implies that Hood and Washington were willing to testify against the Charlotte Three on their own without any outside pressures or rewards. The prosecutor asked the pair "whose driving around in a Cadillac while you're stuck in here" and that the leaders are not doing anything while the pair are "stuck in here paying the price". The FBI also believed the truth of what Hood and Washington said in that Charlotte FBI Agent Koon wanted to transform Grant into an informant on his other troublemaking friends, but that did not end up panning out.

== Court case ==
With three black defendants, the lawyers for the Charlotte Three requested that since the grand jury "excludes blacks from participation since it is derived from voter registration laws", the case should be dropped. Judge Snepp however refuted that point, as he claimed that blacks could register to vote as they pleased. The defendants' lawyers saw this as a systematic attempt to stop blacks from being able to register to vote. At the time, black voters had to take voter tests, unlike their white counterparts, implying an unfair situation. Similarly, the prosecutor's office decided to appoint no black or Jewish jurors, with a near deaf old black lady as the lone exception. Since the defense had to waste all their challenges and objections that they are legally allowed to have by removing clearly incompetent jury members, they were left at a considerable disadvantage in the courtroom.

Reporters and journalists questioned the evidence and workings of the case. Even though the white prosecutor's office did follow all the laws and did not do anything illegal, "the court empaneled a seriously prejudiced jury of white Southern Baptists". During the trial, the only real piece of evidence other than the falsified witness testimony by Hood and Washington was a picture of a bottle that was presumed to be an unused firebomb. This bottle however was never actually placed into the evidence files of the case since it was mysteriously "lost" by the fire marshals, and that the "original photograph was staged". Though there seemed to be very little evidence to support the prosecutor's claims, the jury returned a guilty verdict within one hour of the case's arguments ending. T.J. Reddy was sentenced to 20 years, James Grant got 25 years, and Charles Parker received 10 years (8).

The sentencing of the Charlotte Three emphasized a clear dichotomy: the white jurors wanted to be fair in trial, but were worried of the social repercussions that would come about from supporting these black men. There was a fear of a "black revolution" in the South at that time, and by imprisoning the leaders of black movements across the South, whites were able to contain that movement and stymie it. Many saw the decision as one that favored the persecuting of black leaders for their black revolution ideas, in that Judge Snepp sentenced Grant to 25 years due to his education.

== Problems with testimony ==
Judge Snepp said that since Grant was so educated, with a doctorate, he "showed no gratitude to society" and since he was so well educated, was "an extremely dangerous revolutionary beyond rehabilitation." Reddy was in the eyes of Snepp, dangerous since he was a poet and able to use his talents to appeal to the heart of blacks and revolutionize their ways of thinking. Snepp gave Parker the lightest sentence since he was not deemed as harmful as the rest, as Parker was thought to be an "easily led young Black dupe."

Snepp knew that Hood and Washington "are not exactly A-1 citizens" yet he decided to use their testimony as a key component in the conviction of the Charlotte Three. The credibility given to Washington and his statements about Grant and the Charlotte Three were not questioned during the trial, but should have been. He was the "prime suspect in five murders in the Charlotte area" and yet his testimony was used to put men with clean criminal backgrounds in jail. With crime rates rising, famed philosopher Angela Davis's publicized fight with the FBI, George Jackson's "meteoric rise to militant fame as…Black Party Minister of Defense", and the University of Wisconsin's math building bombing, the crimes of Washington were overlooked. They were not taken seriously enough since the aforementioned crimes were politically motivated, however Washington's were not, and as put by the District Attorney Tom Moore; "sometimes you must go to hell to get the devil". Washington was said to have used "heroin, LSD, and large quantities of alcohol and marijuana" which cast considerable doubt on his credibility.

== Reactions ==
Though the Charlotte Three had been convicted and imprisoned, the general support from Charlotte and the members in the men's lives never stopped. In the Herald Journal, Grant's father mentions that there were "vigils…held in front of the historic Old State House in Hartford…to keep the case alive". The men felt they were representing how racially charged Charlotte had become, and its residents did not want the city to be tainted by corrupt judicial officers. In the Black Panther newspaper, a letter campaign by the North Carolina Political Prisoners Committee started to prosper. Local residents were urged to send letters in support of the Charlotte Three to Governor Hunt of North Carolina in an effort to have the men's sentences commuted.

Additionally, Reddy received support from his fellow poets, such as Sandra Beck of Charlotte who wrote that she had met "few people so creatively and constructively oriented" and who gave his encouragement to many "young writers and authors". Ironically, Reddy was labeled as one who was constructively oriented and creative, yet he was accused of demolishing a construction through the brute force method of arson, which has no creativity to it whatsoever. He also had the whole support of the state's art community "who strongly backed the black poet".

James Grant had received support from individuals in both the North and the South, including Connecticut Governor Ella Grasso, who called her counterpart in North Carolina on Grant's behalf. Grant also had the support of famous Southern prison rights leader L.C. Dorsey who claimed that Grant's imprisonment was a result of wanting to disagree with "a senseless war, racial oppression at home, and the plight of those who had taxation without representation".

== Commuted sentence ==
Grant was eventually granted parole from Governor Hunt of North Carolina reducing his sentence, and Reddy and Parker were also set free. When Grant learned that he was about to be freed, since he had "made progress towards rehabilitation" in the eyes of the Governor instead of a full pardon, he said that "people have paid higher prices" than he has, and that he is fine with whatever decision he is granted. The sentences were not pardoned however by Governor Hunt, but rather commuted, implying that the men were still guilty of the burning in the eyes of the judicial system.

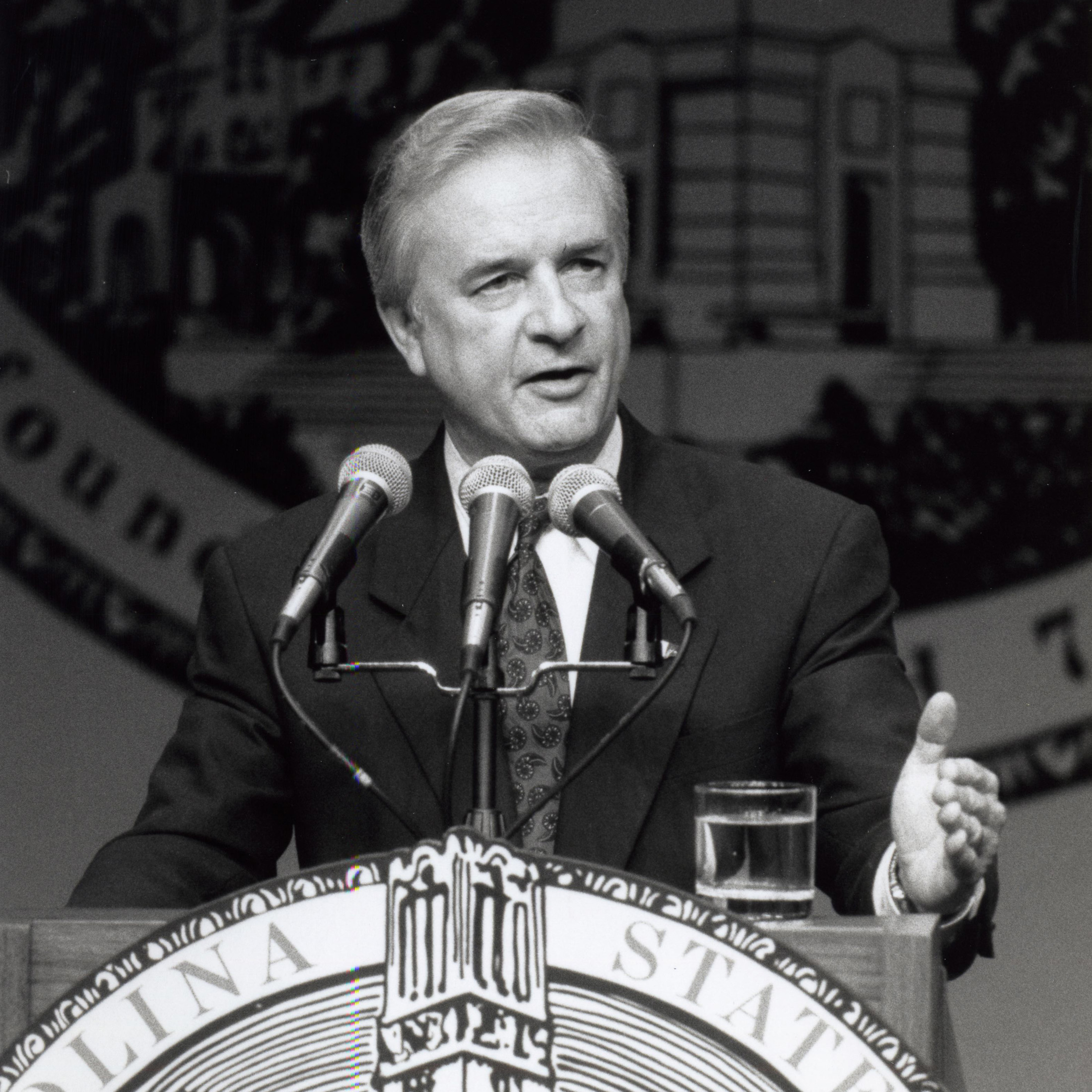
North Carolina Governor Jim Hunt in 1992

== Larger context of politics, race, and the civil rights movement ==
The Charlotte Three case was an event that epitomized the larger issues of politics, race, and the civil rights movement in the South. The commuting of the sentences for the men may not have actually been purely due to the reasons publicly stated, but instead for hidden political ones. In 1979, an election year, there was a lot of turmoil and Governor Hunt and the Democratic party were worried about the backlash that would ensue if the men were still imprisoned at the time of the election. Herbert N. Lape who was serving as the vice-chairman of the North Carolina state democratic party stated in a letter to Hunt that many people in the state view "the Charlotte Three [case] as [a] primarily white witch [hunt] that involved racial bigotry". A secretary by the name of Joseph Grimsley also stated in a memo to Governor Hunt, "[the] state's repressive image is beginning to spill over in this administration to yours personally".

The administration was in a position where it had to save face by reducing the sentences or else face the possibility of losing control to another party. The judge had originally given out the long sentences because he wanted to show that it was "the smashing of a dangerous Black revolution plot". He hoped to set an example of the men, as he was worried of more of these plots in the future.

== Criticism ==
The case of the Charlotte Three was not something that was entirely unique; rather, as historian John Schutz argued, it was the ordinary in the mid-1900s South. By persecuting "black leaders for conventional crimes", the state could follow "civilized" methods that would instead of cause violence, put the leader in jail where he could no longer do any more leading. Expert Raymond Michalowski believes these persecutions of blacks were similar to those of the KKK or other "night riders of decades past" but instead of illegal henchmen carrying out the attacks, legal judges and prosecutors were doing so in the courts. By charging the leaders with crimes, the state was able to make it seem like the leaders were not as viable as they claimed to be. This helped to mute some of the public support the leaders may have originally garnered. Though the South seemed to have overtly fixed its race problem after the passage of federal civil rights legislation in 1964-65, it was covertly persecuting Black revolutionary leaders. The persecutions were not taking place out on the streets through public lynching as in times past, but instead through illegal backdoor deals supported by the judicial system.
