= Catawba Rosenwald School =

- U.S. National Register of Historic Places
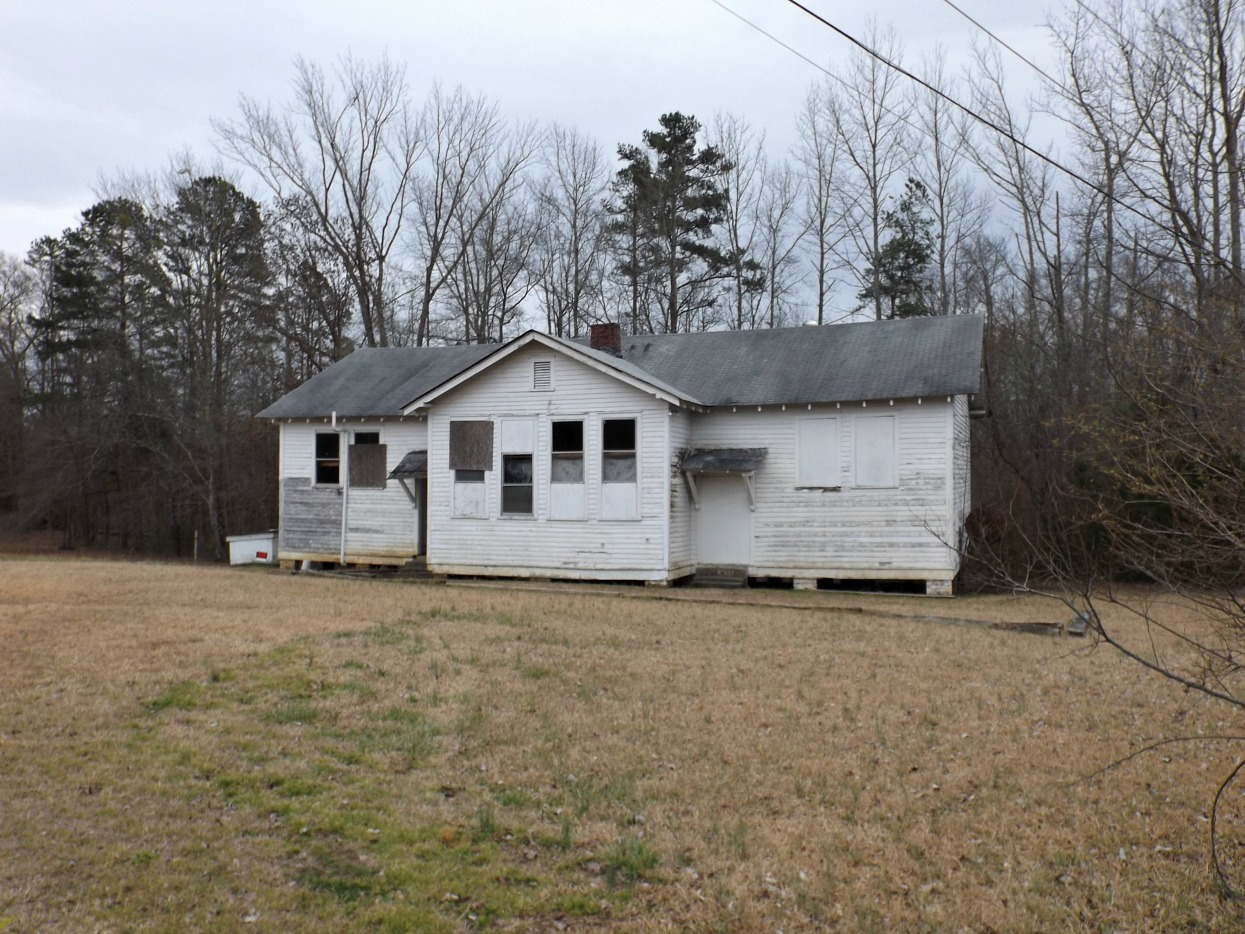

- Location within South Carolina Location within the United States
- Location: 3071 South Anderson Road, Catawba, South Carolina
- Coordinates: 34°54′43″N 80°58′35″W
- NRHP reference No.: 13000465
- Added to NRHP: July 3, 2013

The Catawba Rosenwald School is a historic school building at 3071 South Anderson Road United States Route 21) in Catawba, South Carolina. It is a single-story wood-frame structure, built in 1924–25 with support from the Rosenwald Fund, to one of the fund's architectural plans. It served as a school for the area's African-American population from then until its closure in 1956. In 1960 the vacant building was moved within the same property to accommodate the widening of South Anderson Road. It is one of two surviving Rosenwald schools in York County. It is owned by the Rock Hill School District.

The building was listed on the National Register of Historic Places in 2013.

== See also ==
- National Register of Historic Places listings in Rock Hill, South Carolina
