= White House (Rock Hill, South Carolina) =

Historic house in South Carolina, United States

- White Home
- U.S. National Register of Historic Places
- U.S. Historic district – Contributing property
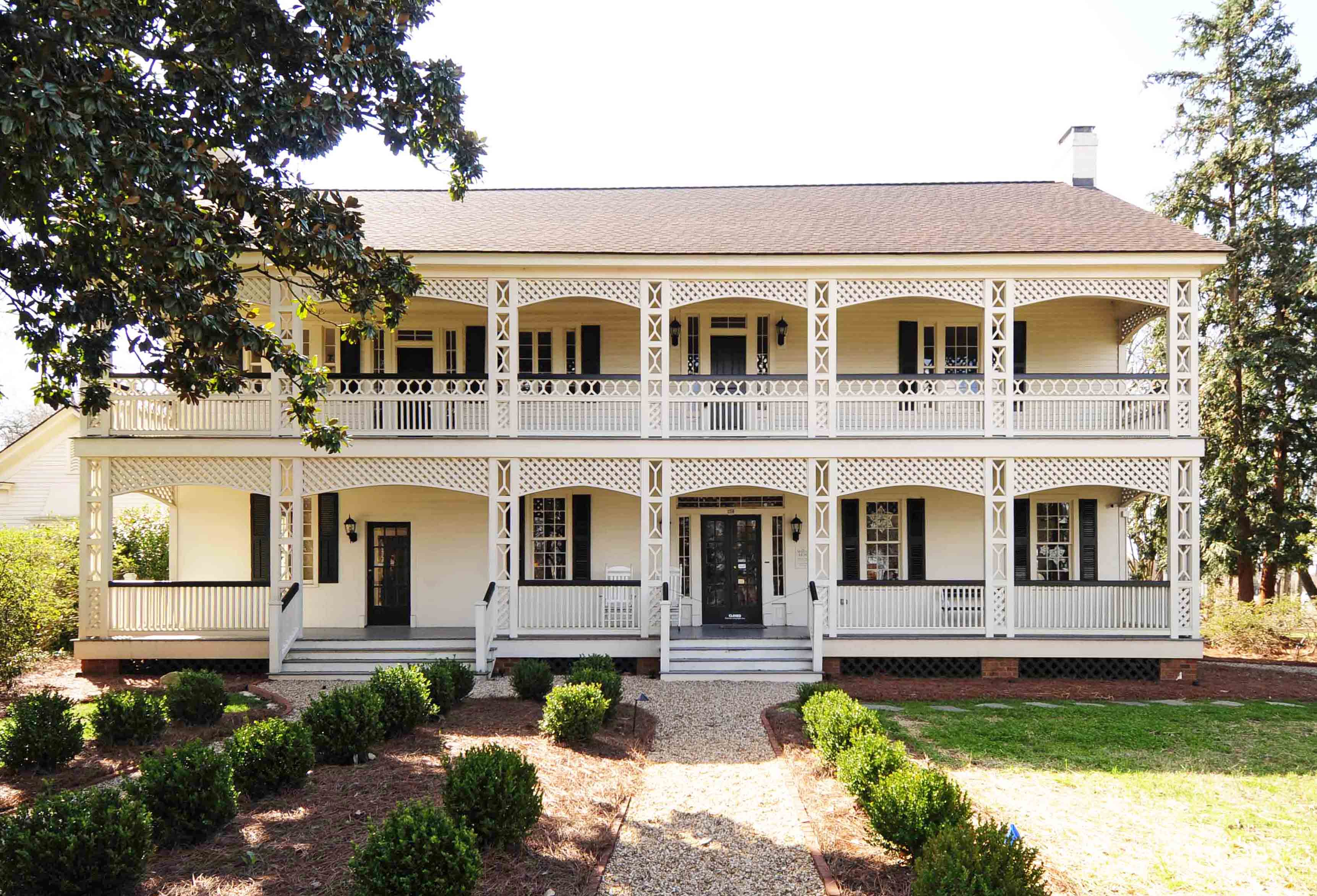

- Location within South Carolina Location within the United States
- Location: 258 E. White St., Rock Hill, South Carolina
- Coordinates: 34°55′33″N 81°1′18″W
- Area: 1.5 acres (0.61 ha)
- Built: 1837
- Website: http://thewhitehomerockhill.com/
- NRHP reference No.: 69000176
- Added to NRHP: December 3, 1969

The White Home in Rock Hill, South Carolina is a historical site & wedding venue. Five generations of the White family lived in the house between 1837 and 2005. Over the years, the home transformed from a one-room cottage into an eighteen-room, two story house. It is located in the Reid Street-North Confederate Avenue Area Historic District.

== Early history ==
The White Home was originally built in 1837, but has undergone extensive renovations and expansions since then. George Pendleton White and Ann Hutchison White purchased the land from Alexander Templeton Black and moved into the original one-room cabin in 1837. They started out with 153 acres of land. George and Ann began to make additions to the one-room cottage soon after their arrival.

After George's death on February 25, 1849, Ann continued making renovations until the cottage became a large two-story home. To sustain herself and her four small children Ann rented rooms to boarders, particularly during the Civil War, who often paid her in furniture as they fled from the approaching Union Army. Ann was also able to afford an 1870s building project because of a considerable inheritance left to her by her older brother, Hiram Hutchison.

Aside from paying boarders, Ann had a room set aside - the "Prophet's Chamber" - for traveling ministers passing through Rock Hill. Ann White was also renowned for her generous participation in the community, including donations to schools and the building of Rock Hill's first Presbyterian Church.

== Construction, expansion, and renovation of the White Home ==
The White Home began as a one-room cottage, which is believed to have been built shortly before the White's obtained the property. There is a separate log cabin behind the house which was later used as a kitchen for the boarding house but does predate the property by a number of years.

After her husband died, Ann White took over management of the family's finances. Due to laws regarding inheritance, she was only authorized to act as a steward for her son. As a result, she was forced to keep meticulous receipts of everything she purchased. These receipts were found preserved in the attic when the White Home was refurbished into a museum. These receipts provide information about what types of supplies Ann White purchased, where she purchased them, and how much they cost.

In 1849, as the house was expanded, a room known as "the Prophet's Chamber" was added on the second floor. This room was specifically set aside to host traveling ministers.

When Ann's brother, Hiram Hutchison, died on October 22, 1856, he left a fortune to Ann. She used this money to make additional expansions to the White Home, as well as some aesthetic changes beginning in 1859. One change was the addition of a front porch in 1859.

Construction of the annex began around 1869 and was finished around 1871. Ann White installed lightning rods on the house in 1870, and gutters were installed in November 1871. The first known photograph of the home was taken in 1872.

The White Home was listed on the National Register of Historic Places in 1969. The White family owned and lived in the home until 2005, when the house and three acres of surrounding land were purchased by Historic Rock Hill, a society for the preservation and restoration of historic homes in Rock Hill. Historic Rock Hill made extensive renovations to the site from 2006 to 2010 and the site was opened to the public as a museum in 2010.

== White family involvement in Rock Hill ==
The White family was very involved in Rock Hill from the beginning, even before it was incorporated as a town.

=== The railroad ===
George Pendleton White was very supportive of bringing the proposed Charlotte to Columbia rail line through Rock Hill. On October 10, 1848, he was issued a contract by the Charlotte and South Carolina Railroad Company. The contract was to excavate and grade part of the railroad.

=== Rock Hill Academy ===
Rock Hill's first school opened in September 1854. It was built on land donated by Ann Hutchison White. The land was covered by a pine grove, leading many locals to refer to the school as the Pine Grove Academy instead of by its official name. The school was located approximately 250 yards northeast of the White Home and a half mile from the railroad depot. By 1856 the school had 60 male pupils. Prior to this, students had gone to Ebenezer Academy. In 1856, the Pine Grove Academy for girls was opened as well.

=== The incorporation of Rock Hill ===
Rock Hill was not officially incorporated as a town until February 26, 1870. This was the third time local residents had tried to get the town incorporated.

The White family was divided about this decision. Some members of the family, like James Spratt White, were in favor of incorporation. Other members, such as Ann Hutchison White and her son A. H. White, were against incorporation. The White family owned a significant portion of the land that would be incorporated as part of the town; Ann wanted to avoid the extra taxes that would result from incorporation.

In response to the petition from some local residents asking for incorporation, several prominent residents sent a counter-petition against incorporation. Seven people, who owned 4/5th of the land that would become Rock Hill, gave several reasons for opposing incorporation. Among them were opposition to the expense of resurfacing the muddy streets, the lack of any perceived positive benefit to incorporation, fears that incompetent men could find their way onto the town council, and worries that they would be unable to afford the high taxes. The town was incorporated by the state legislature anyway.

== Past residents ==
=== George Pendleton White (1801-1849) ===
George Pendleton White was the first owner of the White Home, which is named after his family. George was the son of Hugh White and Elizabeth Spratt White. George was a Scots-Irish Presbyterian. He married Ann Hutchison on December 14, 1837. George was a tailor by trade. He died on February 25, 1849, of pneumonia which he caught while supervising his building crew that was working on preparing for a new railroad line.

=== Ann Hutchison White (1805-1880) ===
Ann Hutchison White was born on January 9, 1805. She was one of sixteen children. Her father was David Hutchison; the family lived on a plantation along the Catawba River. David Hutchison was one of the earliest white settlers to move onto Catawba Indian land. One of her brothers was A. E. Hutchison, who was one of the financial backers of the Indian Land Chronicle and joined the Indian Land Agricultural Society when it formed in the 1850s.

Ann Hutchison married George Pendleton White on December 14, 1837; together they were the first owners of the White Home property.

Ann White had a reputation as a "woman of strong conviction and decisive action." In one story, she is said to have put a stop to a "grog shop" being set up near her home by mounting "a mule and after a long journey [she] succeeded in purchasing the entire tract of land, thereby eliminating undesirable neighbors."

During the Civil War, Ann took in refugees fleeing war torn areas. According to various stories, some visitors left behind heavy furniture that they could no longer travel with.

After the Civil War, Ann White sold off pieces of the family's land in order to make money. One customer was Edwin Ruthven Mills who purchased some of her land in 1872. During the Civil War, at the Battle of the Crater, he led Rock Hill's Company E.

Ann White was one of seven people to sign a counter-petition in 1870 that opposed the incorporation of Rock Hill into a town. The seven petitions against incorporation owned four-fifths of the land that would be incorporated into the new town, and thus would have to pay the majority of the taxes. They lost this fight, and the town was official incorporated on February 26, 1870.

Ann White died on June 21, 1880.

=== Mary Elizabeth White ===
Mary Elizabeth White was the first child of Ann and George White. She was born on October 28, 1838, at home.

=== James Spratt White ===
Son of George and Ann White. James Spratt White served in the Confederate Army in the American Civil War. In February 1865, he wrote to his sister Mary about his fears that General Sherman would march into York County, and then his relief when Sherman went in another direction.

=== Andrew Hutchison White ===
Son of George and Ann White. After the Civil War, he became an entrepreneur. During the town incorporation battle, he sided with his mother against incorporation. He was one of the seven people to sign a counterpetition in 1870 against incorporation.

== Historic Rock Hill ==
Historic Rock Hill is a 501(c)3 non-profit organization which owns, restored, and manages the White Home. Historic Rock Hill's headquarters is also located on the second floor of the building. The mission of Historic Rock Hill is to "preserve and protect the historic resources of Rock Hill, South Carolina and enhance the livability of its historic areas." Historic Rock Hill works to preserve buildings of historical significance to the town of Rock Hill. It also educates the public about Rock Hill's history and collects historic documents, photographs, and personal accounts.

Historic Rock Hill purchased the White Home in 2005 and spent five years restoring the property. Today it features exhibits on the White family and Rock Hill.

== Present ==
Today, The White Home primarily serves as a wedding and event venue. If you're interested in the historical side of things, Historic Rock Hill offers self-guided tours of The White Home by appointment only.
