= Reid Street–North Confederate Avenue Area Historic District =

Historic district in South Carolina, United States

- U.S. National Register of Historic Places
- U.S. Historic district
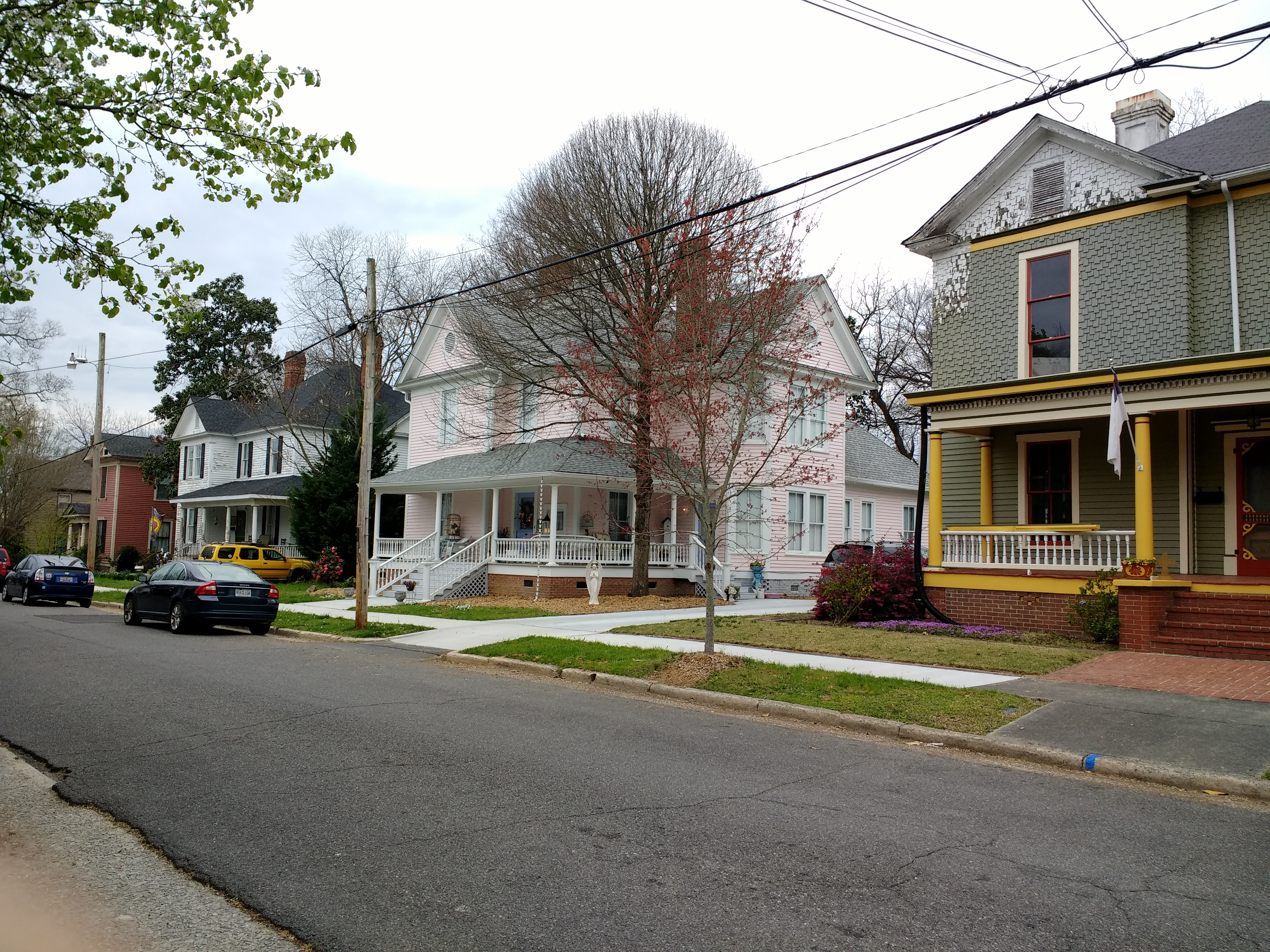

- Location within South Carolina Location within the United States
- Location: Roughly, Reid St. and N. Confederate Ave. between E. Main St. and E. White St., Rock Hill, South Carolina
- Coordinates: 34°55′26″N 81°1′19″W
- Area: 10 acres (4.0 ha)
- Architect: Multiple
- Architectural style: Classical Revival, Bungalow/craftsman, Late Victorian
- MPS: Rock Hill MPS
- NRHP reference No.: 92000657
- Added to NRHP: June 10, 1992

Reid Street–North Confederate Avenue Area Historic District is a national historic district located at Rock Hill, South Carolina. It encompasses 22 contributing buildings in a middle-class residential section of Rock Hill. The district developed between about 1839 and 1935. Architectural styles represented include Victorian, Classical Revival, Queen Anne, and Bungalow. Notable buildings include the Steed House (c. 1905), Bynum House (c. 1902), Jenkins House (c. 1905), and Gross-Brock House (c. 1905), along with the separately listed White House.

It was listed on the National Register of Historic Places in 1992.
