= Stokes-Mayfield House =

Historic house in South Carolina, United States

- U.S. National Register of Historic Places
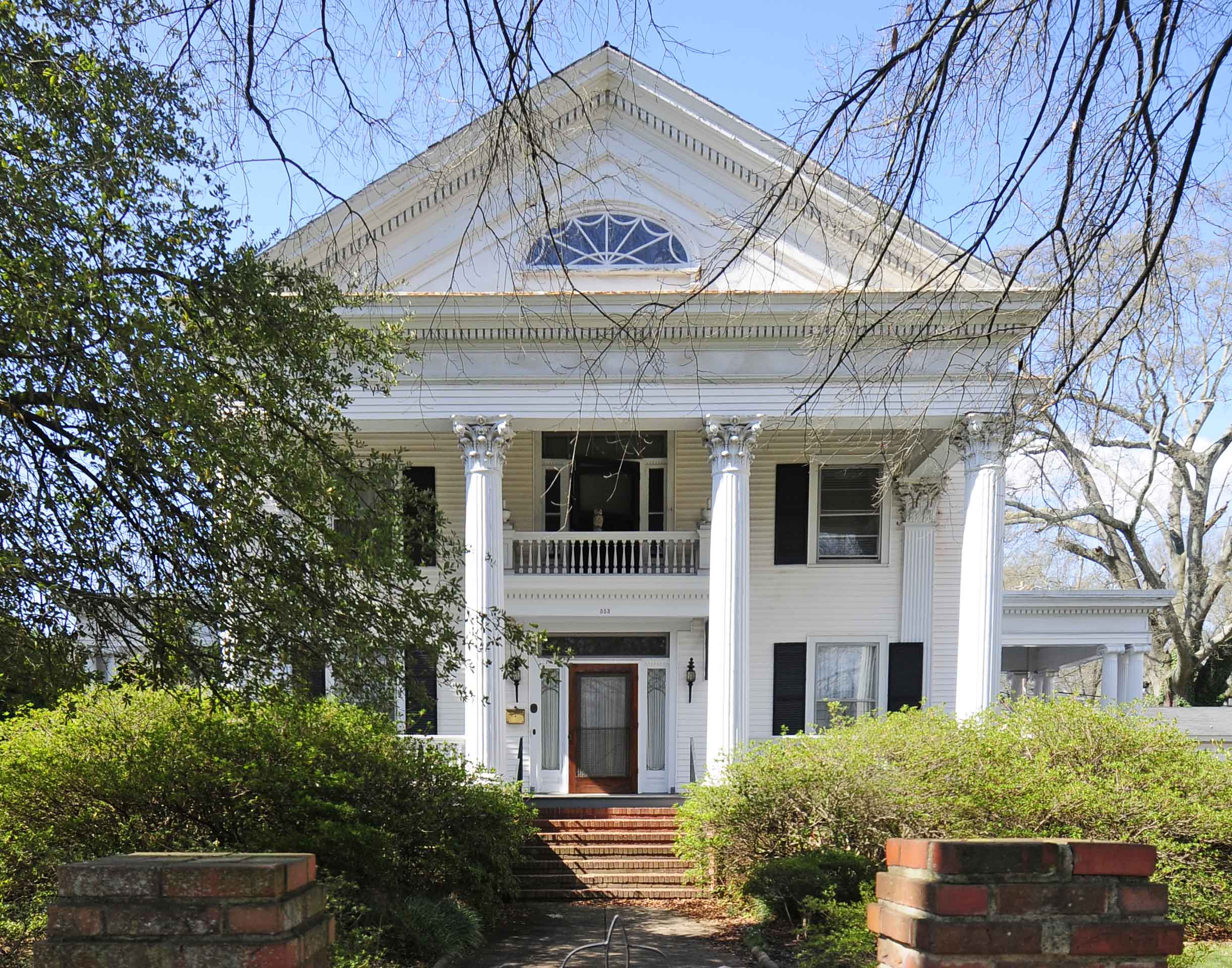
- Stokes-Mayfield House, March 2012

- Location within South Carolina Location within the United States
- Location: 353 Oakland Ave., Rock Hill, South Carolina
- Coordinates: 34°56′3″N 81°1′40″W
- Area: 0.7 acres (0.28 ha)
- Built: 1907
- Built by: Holler, A. E.
- Architect: Starr, Julian
- Architectural style: Classical Revival
- NRHP reference No.: 84002100
- Added to NRHP: May 17, 1984

Stokes-Mayfield House is a historic home located at Rock Hill, South Carolina. It was built in 1907, and is a two-story, frame residence with cross-gabled slate roof in the Neo-Classical style. The house features a two-story tetrastyle Corinthian order pedimented portico and a balcony with decorative iron brackets above the front door.

It was listed on the National Register of Historic Places in 1984.
