= Winthrop University =

Public university in Rock Hill, South Carolina, US

- Former names: Winthrop Training School (1886–1891); South Carolina Industrial and Winthrop Normal College (1891–1893); Winthrop Normal and Industrial College of South Carolina (1893–1920); Winthrop College, the South Carolina College for Women (1920–1974); Winthrop College (1974–1992)
- Motto: Veritas cum libertate
- Motto in English: Truth with liberty
- Type: Public university
- Established: 1886; 140 years ago
- Endowment: $92.1 million (2025)
- President: Edward A. Serna
- Faculty: 418
- Students: 5,287
- Undergraduates: 4,289
- Postgraduates: 998
- Location: Rock Hill, South Carolina, United States; 34°56′20″N 81°1′50″W
- Campus: 425 acres (172.0 ha); Suburban
- Colors: Garnet and gold
- Nickname: Eagles
- Sporting affiliations: NCAA Division I – Big South
- Mascot: Big Stuff
- Website: www.winthrop.edu

Winthrop University is a public university in Rock Hill, South Carolina, United States. It was founded in 1886 by David Bancroft Johnson, who served as the superintendent of Columbia, South Carolina, schools. He received a grant from Robert Charles Winthrop, a philanthropist from Boston, Massachusetts, to establish the school.

Since its inception, Winthrop has developed into a comprehensive university offering undergraduate and graduate degrees through five colleges and schools. It is classified among "Master's Colleges and Universities: Larger Programs". With approximately 6,000 students, it is the sixth-largest university in South Carolina. The 100-acre (40.5 ha) main academic and residential campus is located in Rock Hill, 25 miles (40 km) southwest of Charlotte, North Carolina, and 71 miles (114 km) north of Columbia, South Carolina.

Fielding athletic teams known as Winthrop Eagles, the university participates in the National Collegiate Athletic Association (NCAA) at the Division I level as a member of Big South Conference. The athletic program is known for its success in basketball, esports, soccer, tennis, and volleyball.

== History ==
Winthrop University was founded in 1886, when the Peabody Education Board of Massachusetts, headed by Robert Charles Winthrop, provided $1,500 to form the Winthrop Training School for white women teachers. That year, the school opened its doors to 21 students in Columbia, South Carolina. The school's name changed twice in quick succession, first to the South Carolina Industrial and Winthrop Normal College' in 1891 and then to the Winthrop Normal and Industrial College of South Carolina in 1893, before moving to Rock Hill, its current home, in 1895. The school's name had changed to reflect its mission to prepare some students for industrial jobs.

The college remained segregated until 1964, and became fully coeducational in 1974. With this change, the school's name changed to Winthrop College. Evolving from a training school to a college with a four-year full curriculum, it also developed a graduate division. In 1992, it changed its name to Winthrop University.

== Campus ==
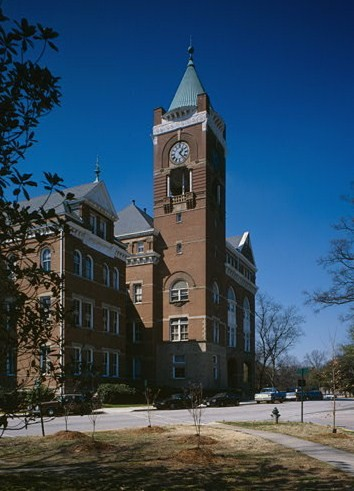
Tillman Hall, built 1894

The university's campus is in the city of Rock Hill, South Carolina. The Winthrop College Historic District is listed on the National Register of Historic Places, as are Tillman Hall and Withers Building. The Winthrop University campus has its own zip code of 29733. Rock Hill has a total of five historic districts listed on the NRHP.

Winthrop's campus is divided into two distinct areas: The main campus houses the academic buildings, residence halls, library, and campus center, and the more recently constructed 317-acre (128.3 ha) Recreational and Research Complex is located about one mile northeast of the main campus.

Winthrop's main campus has had extensive development since the late 20th century. The $12-million Dalton Hall opened in 1999. The Courtyard at Winthrop, which features apartment-style residences for students, opened in 2003. The Lois Rhame West Health, Physical Education and Wellness Center opened in 2007; it is the new home of the university's physical education department and intramural sports. The most recent addition, in 2010, is the DiGiorgio Campus Center, which added a 128,000-square-foot (11,900 m^{2}) multipurpose campus center. This features a 225-seat movie theater, food court, campus bookstore, post office, and casual dining. The DiGiorgio Center is connected to the West Center by an open-air plaza.

The Research Complex hosts the Piedmont Wetlands Research Project, a golf course (open to faculty, students, and alumni), and a world-class disc golf course. (This has been the site of the United States Disc Golf Championship since its opening in 1999.)

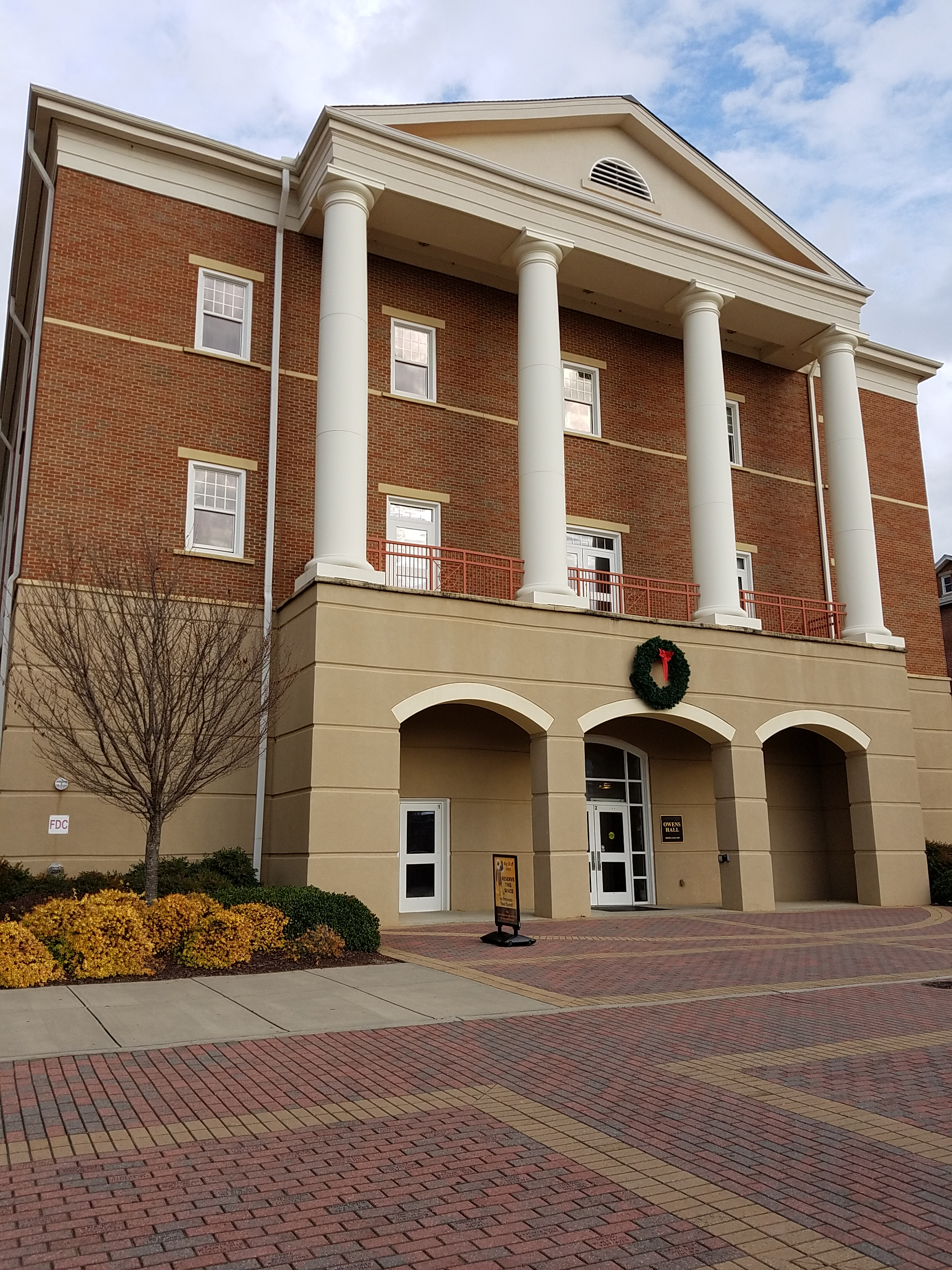
Owens Hall, built 2007

== Organization and administration ==
Appointed by the board of trustees, the university president is the chief administrative officer of Winthrop University. George W. Hynd was appointed interim president in January 2020 and succeeded Daniel F. Mahony, who had served since 2015. The university president is responsible for the administration of the university and oversees budgeting and financial planning, enrollment and admissions, academic planning, university facilities, and other matters.

The Winthrop University Board of Trustees consists of 15 members, including the governor of South Carolina and the state superintendent of education (or designee). In addition to the university president, the board confirms the appointments of the provost and executive vice president for academic affairs, deans, vice presidents, and other administrators.

== Academics ==
Winthrop is accredited by the Commission on Colleges of the Southern Association of Colleges and Schools to award baccalaureate, master's, and specialist degrees. In all the university offers 43 undergraduate and 40 graduate degrees and certificates.

=== Academic colleges ===
The university grants undergraduate degrees through four colleges:

==== College of Business and Technology ====
Founded in 1968, the College of Business Administration was renamed the College of Business and Technology in 2024. The college has bachelor of science and bachelor of arts degree programs. Two master of business administration degrees are offered at the graduate level. the College of Business and Technology has been accredited by AACSB-International since 1979.

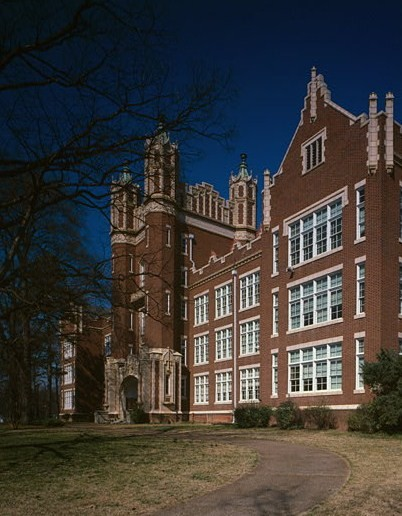
Withers Building College of Education (1912)

==== Richard W. Riley College of Education ====
Created in 1968, the College of Education was renamed the Richard W. Riley College of Education in 2000. At the undergraduate level, a bachelor of science degree is offered. The Richard W. Riley College of Education has master of arts in teaching, master of science, and master of education graduate degree programs and an educational specialist in education leadership (Ed.S.) program.

==== College of Visual and Performing Arts ====
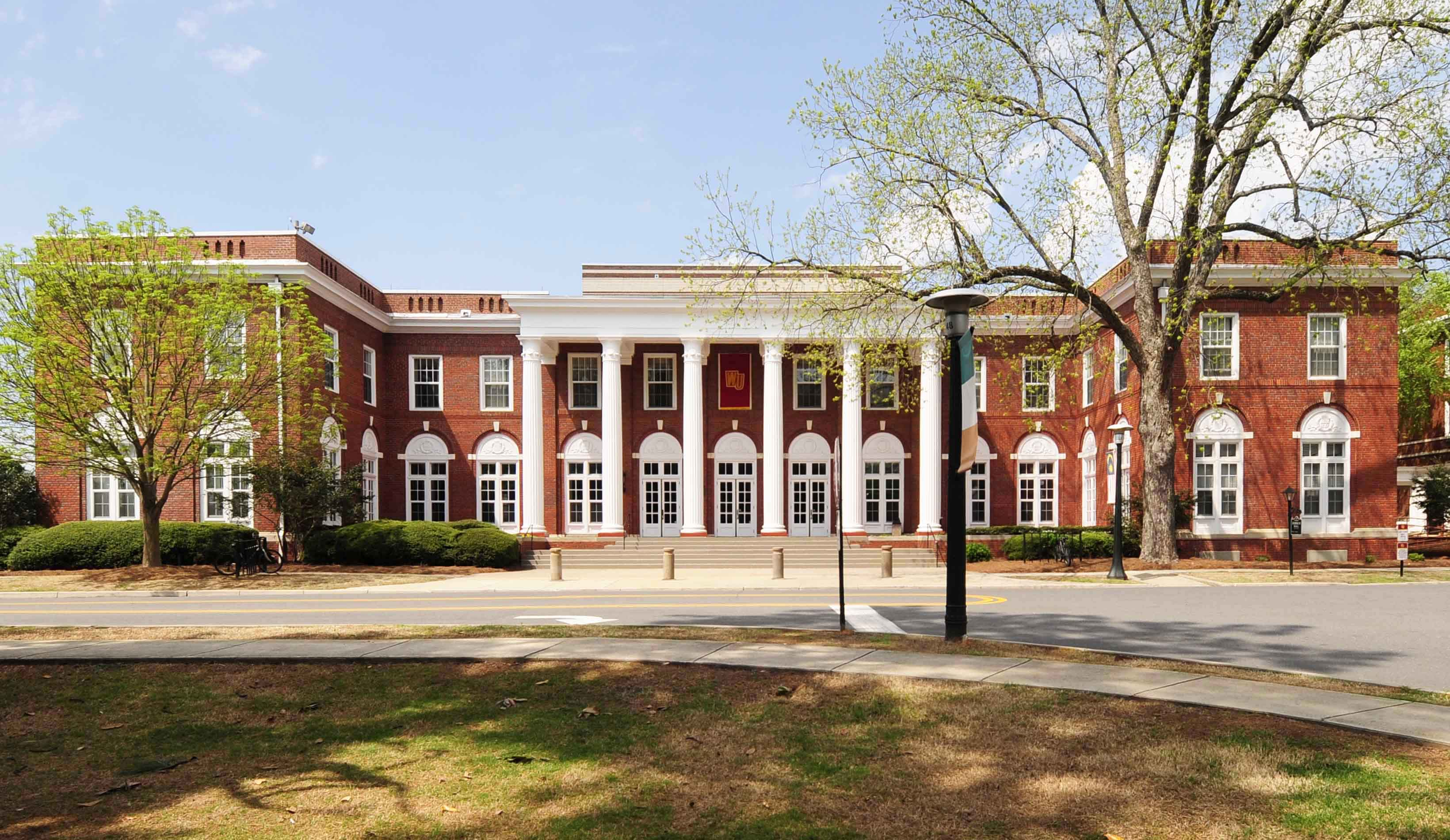
Johnson Hall theatre (1920)

The College of Visual and Performing Arts was established in 1988 and consists of the departments of Design, Fine Arts, Music, and Theatre and Dance. At the undergraduate level, the College of Visual and Performing Arts has bachelor of arts, bachelor of fine arts, bachelor of design, bachelor of music, and bachelor of music education degree programs. The master of arts, master of fine arts, master of music, and master of music education degrees are offered at the graduate level. Students and faculty annually produce more than 100 music performances, theatre and dance performances, and numerous curated exhibitions in two campus art galleries. Winthrop University is one of 37 universities nationally—and the only public or private institution in South Carolina—with all arts programs accredited.

==== College of Arts and Sciences ====
Established in 1967, the College of Arts and Sciences has bachelor of arts, bachelor of science, and bachelor of social work programs. At the graduate level, the College of Arts and Sciences offers the master of liberal arts, master of arts, master of social work, and master of science degrees, as well as a specialist degree in school psychology.

=== University College ===
Overseen by the dean of University College and vice provost for Student Success, Winthrop's University College was created in 2003 to coordinate and support "programs in both academic affairs and student affairs." Although University College does not confer academic degrees, all undergraduate students are served by its various offices, resources, and range of programs. University College houses the Academic Success Center, Office of Undergraduate Research, and International Center. The university honors program, McNair Scholars Program, Leadership Studies Program, TRiO Achievers Program, and General Education Program are also major components of University College. Winthrop's University College allows faculty and staff to work across disciplines to ensure all students have a common academic foundation.

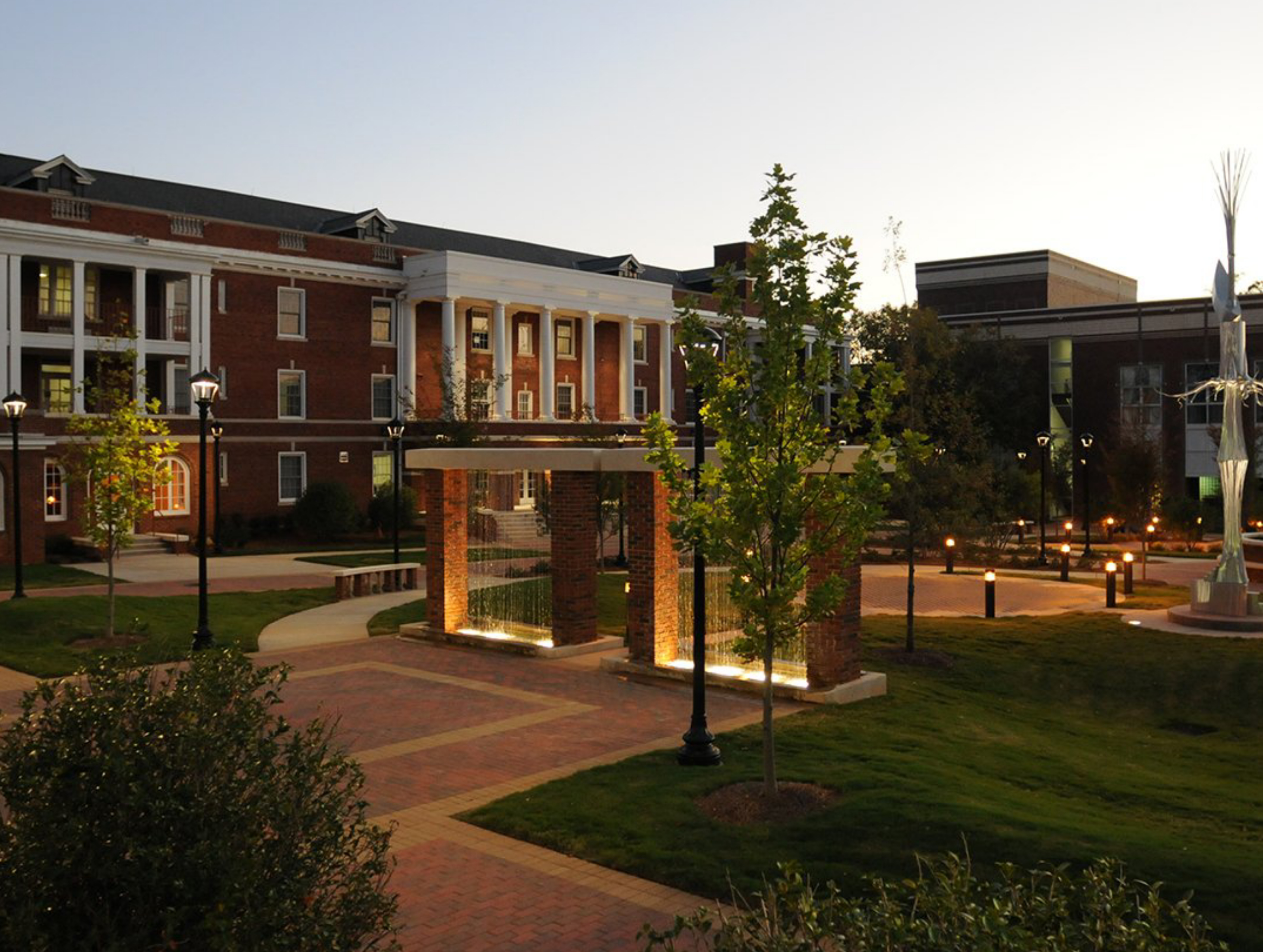
Hardin Family Garden

==== Honors Program ====
Founded in 1960, Winthrop University's Honors Program is among the oldest in the nation. Dr. John S. Eells served as the founding director of Winthrop's University Honors Program and was elected the fourth President of the National Collegiate Honors Council in 1970.

Today, more than 250 students from each of Winthrop's four degree-granting colleges participate in the University Honors Program. Honors program students have access to early registration for classes, may enroll in small honors seminars, and receive honors academic advising. Many honors courses are taught at the Honors Center at The Courtyard at Winthrop, which offers a dedicated residence life program for University Honors Program students. Students must complete 23 hours of honors coursework, an honors thesis or other culminating experience, and a service-learning project, and maintain a minimum 3.30 grade point average to graduate with a University Honors Program degree. Students who compete these requirements receive honors recognition and honors academic regalia at commencement.

=== Ida Jane Dacus Library and Louise Pettus Archives and Special Collections ===
Named after Winthrop University's first librarian, the current library building opened in 1969 in response to the university's growth. The Ida Jane Dacus Library contains 476,473 volumes, circulates 38,943 items per year, and participates in the interlibrary loan and PASCAL delivers programs. The Louise Pettus Archives & Special Collections, housed in a separate structure on Cherry Road, contains original documents, manuscripts, and rare books about Winthrop University's history as well as the state of South Carolina's history, including the Catawba region. The academic and administrative affairs of both the Ida Jane Dacus Library and Louise Pettus Archives & Special Collections are overseen by the dean, who reports directly to the provost and executive vice president for academic affairs.

=== Faculty ===
The university employs 286 full-time and 222 part-time faculty members, 59 of whom are classified as minorities and 290 of whom are women. Of the 286 full-time faculty members, 248 have earned their terminal degree, 34 have a nonterminal master's degree, and one has a nonterminal bachelor's degree. Currently, the student-faculty ratio is 12:1.

=== Rankings and admissions ===
In 2021, Winthrop was ranked as the number-13 Best Regional University in the South by U.S. News & World Report, as well as the number-seven Best College for Veterans and number-11 Best College for Undergraduate Teaching. Winthrop has been recognized as South Carolina's top-rated university according to evaluations conducted by the South Carolina Commission on Higher Education. Winthrop has been rated by the commission as "substantially exceeding standards" every year since that classification was created in 2003.

Admission to Winthrop is defined by U.S. News & Report as “selective”, with an acceptance rate of 69%. The average freshman had a 3.98 high school GPA and received an SAT (CR+M) score between 980 and 1200 and an ACT score between 19 and 25.

== Student life ==
Undergraduate demographics as of Fall 2023
Race and ethnicity	Total
White	51%
Black	32%
Hispanic	8%
Two or more races	6%
Asian	2%
International student	2%
Economic diversity
Low-income (Note: The percentage of students who received an income-based federal Pell grant intended for low-income students.)	43%
Affluent (Note: The percentage of students who are a part of the American middle class at the bare minimum.)	57%

The university has 6,073 students. Undergraduate students come from 42 U.S. states and 45 countries. There are 135 undergraduate international students enrolled. The majority of Winthrop's students are from South Carolina, with out-of-state and foreign students accounting for 13% of undergraduate enrollment.

Of the student population, 5,014 are undergraduate students and 1,059 are graduate students. In 2012, the student body was 29 percent male and 71 percent female, and 28 percent African-American and 60 percent white, non-Hispanic.

The university's average size of undergraduate lecture courses is 22 students. All freshman and second-year students are required to live on campus, unless they live at home with their parents or legal guardians. Ninety-one (91%) percent of freshman and forty-five (45%) percent of all undergraduate students live on-campus.

=== Student culture ===
Winthrop's DiGiorgio Student Union Program Board has been ranked the best Program Board in the nation three times for the quality and variety of programming, including both lecturers and entertainers. The trade publication Campus Activities Magazine has ranked the university as having the "Best Campus Program" in the nation in 1995, 2002, 2004, and 2013. Winthrop is the only university in the nation to be on the ballot every year since this award was inaugurated in 1995.

Scholars Walk

In addition to completing the academic requirements of their chosen degree, full-time Winthrop undergraduates, in order to graduate, are required to attend three cultural events for every 20 semester hours. The university maintains an extensive calendar of events that qualify as being "cultural events".

The university has more than 180 student organizations.

=== Greek life ===
The university recognizes 19 chapters of national fraternities and sororities with more than 700 students members.

=== Student media ===
The Johnsonian, Winthrop's independent weekly student newspaper, has been published since 1923. In 2016, it was voted as the top student newspaper in the state of South Carolina by the S.C. Press Association.

== Athletics ==
The university is a member of the National Collegiate Athletic Association (NCAA) and competes on the Division I level.

Winthrop is a charter member of the Big South Conference. Winthrop's teams are known as the Eagles and their colors are garnet and gold.

The university sponsors 18 intercollegiate teams (eight men's, 10 women's, one co-ed) in baseball, basketball, cross country running, golf, soccer, and track and field on the men's side, and basketball, cross country, golf, lacrosse, soccer, softball, track and volleyball on the women's side. The esports team is the only co-ed athletics program.

The university has labeled itself "The Campus of Champions" as its intercollegiate athletic teams have experienced success in recent years. Specifically, the university has won numerous Big South Conference championships in the following sports: baseball (three since 1995), men's basketball (eleven since 1988), men's cross country (two since 2000), men's soccer (six since 2002), men's tennis (four since 1997*), women's tennis (20 since 1994*), softball (three since 1989), women's lacrosse (two since 2015), and women's volleyball (four since 2002).

The tennis programs were discontinued in 2020 due to financial losses from the university caused by the COVID-19 pandemic.

In 2024, Winthrop made US national news when it became the first Division 1 college to offer scholarships to play cornhole.

=== Facilities ===
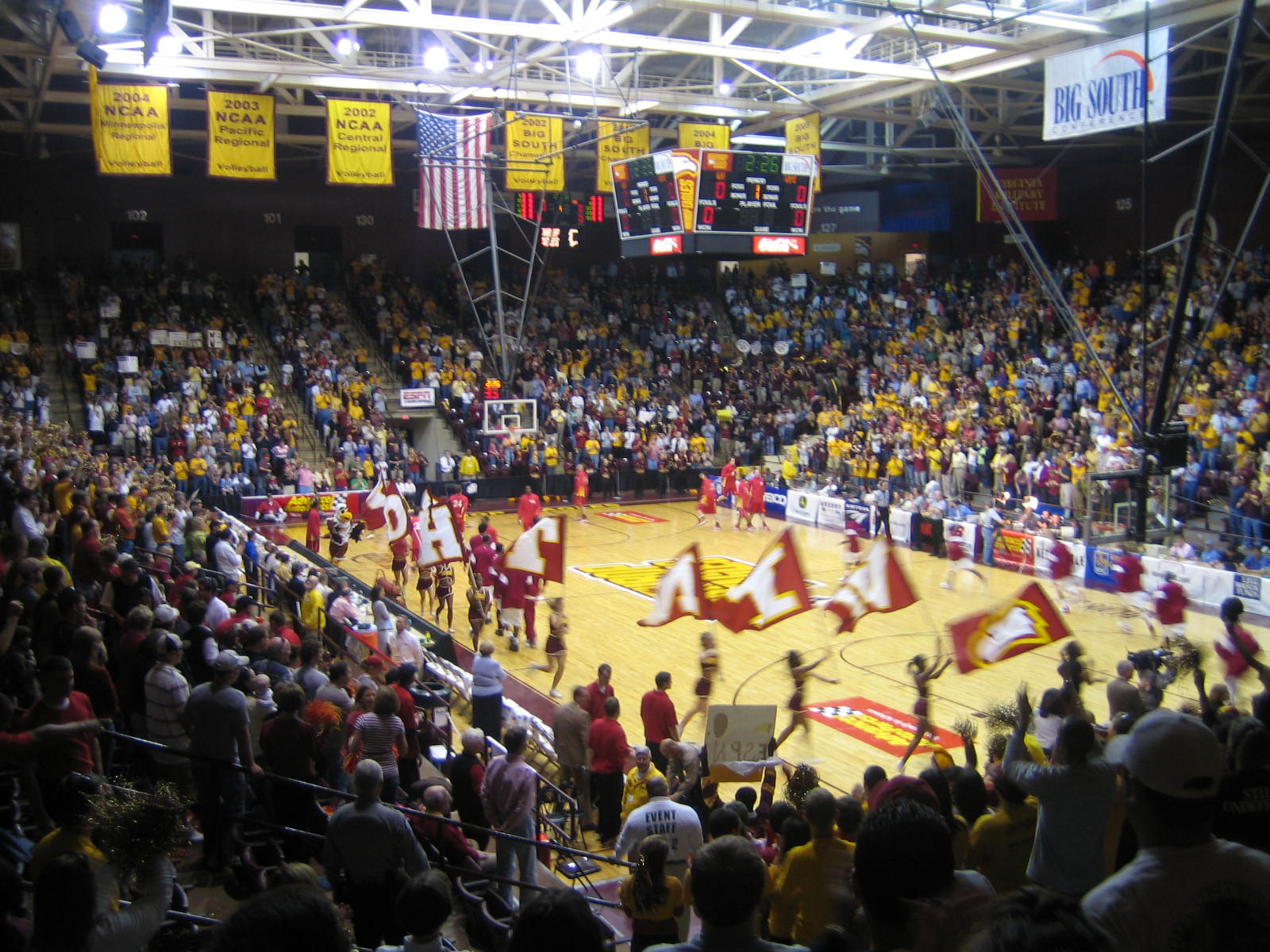
Winthrop Coliseum

At the heart of the university's athletic facilities is the Winthrop Coliseum. In addition to serving as the home venue of the men's and women's basketball and volleyball teams, the university's athletic department offices are located in the Coliseum. The arena features 6,100 permanent seats and hosts numerous non-university shows and events in addition to Winthrop athletic contests. The Coliseum also served as the temporary practice site of the NFL's Carolina Panthers until completion of the team's facilities in Charlotte.

The Winthrop baseball team plays at Winthrop Ballpark, a multimillion-dollar 1,989-seat baseball stadium that opened in 2003.

Opened in 2005, the university's track and field teams compete on the $2.8 million Irwin Belk Track Complex. The facility hosts numerous Division 1 meets.

The university's soccer teams compete at the recently completed Eagle Field. The facility features 1,800 permanent seats, a press box, field house, and a Daktronics LCD scoreboard. In addition, the playing field is a Tifway 419 hybrid Bermuda grass with Eagle Blend and Sun Star.

The softball team competes at the Winthrop Softball Complex, which opened in 2001. The facility includes four fields, locker rooms, and an indoor batting cage.

=== Men's basketball ===
Perhaps the university's most well-known athletic team is the men's basketball team, which has earned a berth in twelve NCAA Division I men's basketball tournaments since 1999. Additionally, it has won the Big South Conference Championship thirteen times (1988, 1999, 2000, 2001, 2002, 2005, 2006, 2007). Winthrop has won more Big South Conference Championships than any other school in the conference.

On March 5, 2007, the Winthrop Eagles men's basketball team was ranked in the Top 25 of both major college basketball polls for the first time in school history. The Eagles were ranked #22 in the USA TODAY/ESPN Top 25 poll and #24 on the Associated Press (AP) Top 25 poll. Later that spring on March 16, 2007, the Winthrop Eagles defeated Notre Dame for the first NCAA men's basketball tournament win in school history.

In March 2012, Winthrop named Pat Kelsey as the new head coach of the Eagles. Under Kelsey, the program had a record of 186–95. In 2017, the Eagles earned a #13 seed in the NCAA tournament but lost to #4 Butler in the opening round. The Eagles earned an automatic bid into the 2020 NCAA tournament, which was cancelled due to the COVID-19 pandemic. In 2021, the Eagles earned a #12 seed in the NCAA tournament and lost to #5 Villanova in the first round. Kelsey left Winthrop following the 2021 season to become head coach at the College of Charleston.

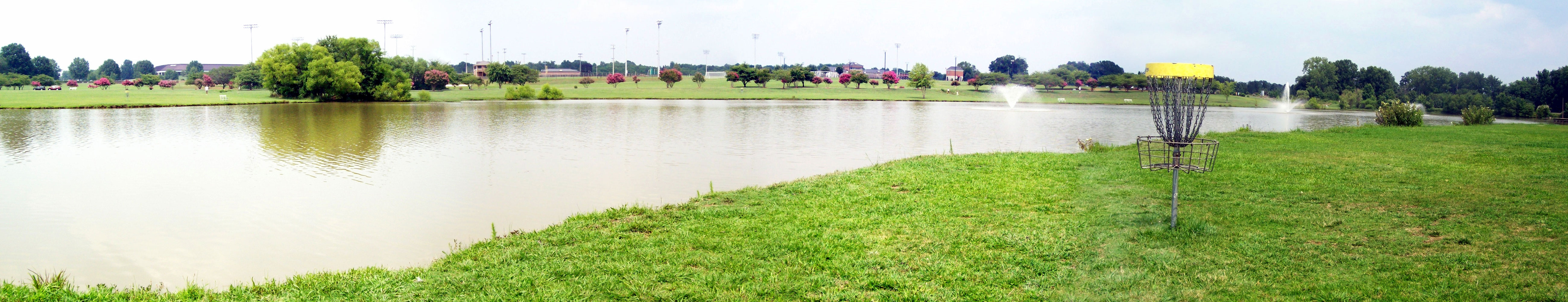
Hole #17 on both the Lakefront and Gold disc golf courses at Winthrop University

== Notable people ==
=== Faculty ===
- Elizabeth Friench Johnson, head of Modern Languages department from 1922 to 1955
- Louise Siddall, composer, music department chair
- Ruth Stokes, mathematician, cryptologist, and astronomer

=== Alumni ===
==== Academics ====
- Lakeyta Bonnette-Bailey, academic
- Mildred M. Jordan, medical librarian

==== Government ====
- DeAndrea Benjamin, Judge of the United States Court of Appeals for the Fourth Circuit
- Ruth Williams Cupp, South Carolina state legislator
- Steven Dillingham (1973), director of the United States Census Bureau
- Mary Gordon Ellis (1913), first woman elected to the South Carolina legislature
- Martha Thomas Fitzgerald (1916), first woman elected to the South Carolina House of Representatives in a general election
- Kambrell Garvin, member of the South Carolina House of Representatives
- Chip Huggins (1987), member of South Carolina House of Representatives
- Ann McCrory, First Lady of North Carolina
- Terence Roberts, mayor of Anderson, South Carolina
- Gary Simrill, former member of the South Carolina House of Representatives
- Linda H. Short (1984), former South Carolina State senator
- Lois Rhame West (1943), First Lady of South Carolina (1971–1975); first woman to chair the Muscular Dystrophy Association; co-chair of Winthrop's first capital campaign
- Kate Vixon Wofford (1916), first woman to hold elected office in South Carolina

==== Arts ====
- Pi'erre Bourne (Jordan Timothy Jenks), music producer and rapper
- Cathy Smith Bowers (BA, 1972; MA, 1976), poet and professor; North Carolina Poet Laureate (2010–2012)
- Leigh Chapman, screenwriter, television writer and actress
- Matthew Cordell, Caldecott-award-winning children's book illustrator
- Bob Crawford, jazz guitarist; bass player for Grammy-nominated The Avett Brothers
- Anne King Gregorie (A.B., 1906), historian and author; first woman to be granted a doctorate in history by the University of South Carolina
- Shanola Hampton, actress best known for her role in the television show Shameless
- Mary Gaulden Jagger (1942), one of the founding members of the National Organization for Women
- Chris Leroux, professional baseball player and star of The Bachelor Canada (2017)
- Andie MacDowell, Golden Globe nominated actress, attended Winthrop from 1976 to 1978
- Mabel Montgomery (1879–1968), writer, photographer, and clubwoman
- Jan Millsapps, filmmaker
- Desmond Pringle, gospel musician
- Thomas James Reddy, artist, poet, activist

==== Athletics ====
- Craig Bradshaw (2007), basketball player
- D.J. Burns (2022), basketball player in the Israeli Basketball Premier League
- Xavier Cooks (2017), basketball player
- Lucille Godbold, gold medalist for shot put in the 1922 Women's World Games
- John Gilkerson (2007), soccer player
- Henry Kalungi (2009), soccer player
- Megan Kauffman (2019), tennis & Australian rules football
- David Kenga (2006), soccer player
- Otto Loewy (2009), soccer player
- Michael Luk (2009), soccer player
- Stephen Nsereko (2010), soccer player
- Marco Reda (2000), soccer player
- Kevin Slowey (2003), Major League Baseball player
- Matt Stinson, soccer player
