= Rock Hill Cotton Factory =

- U.S. National Register of Historic Places
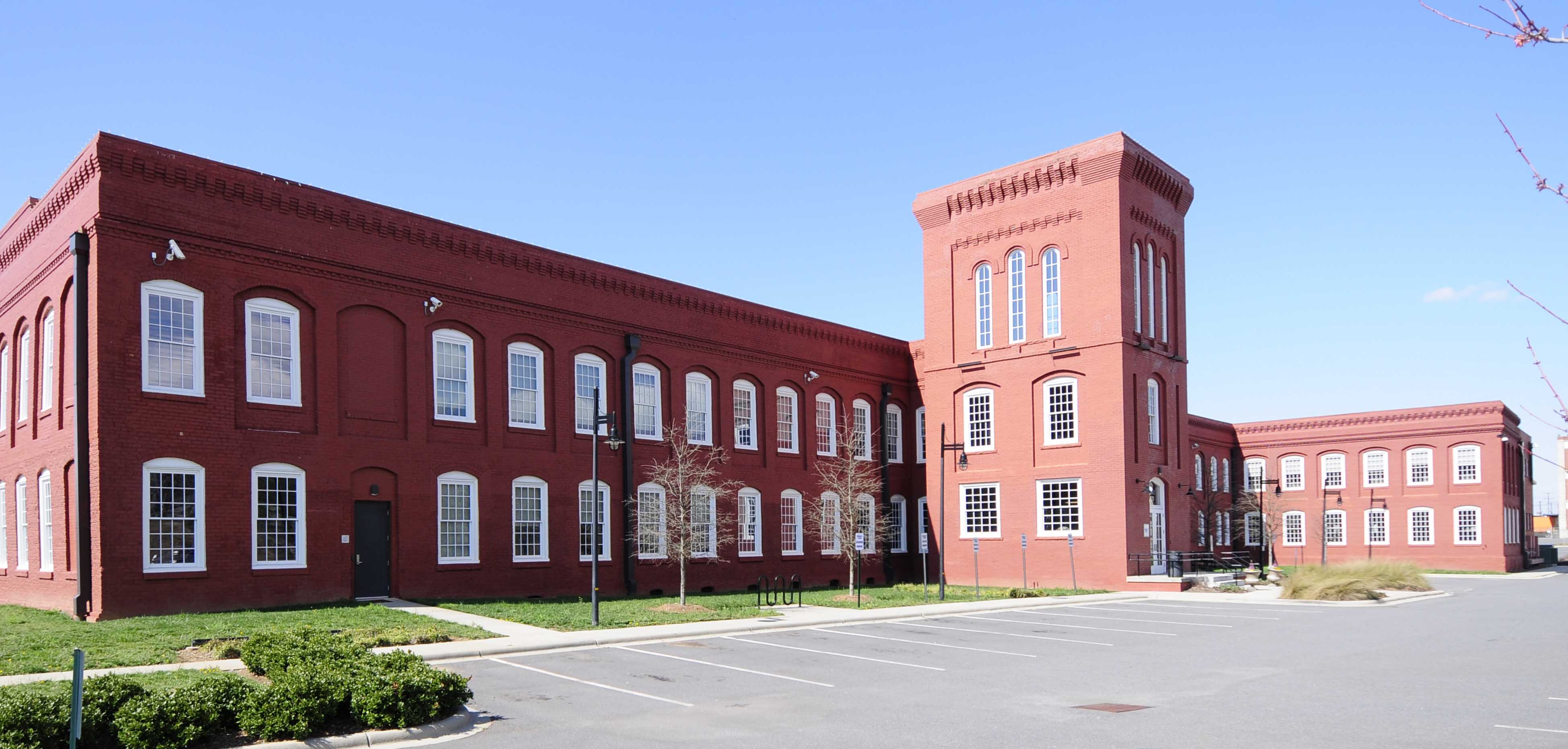
- Rock Hill Cotton Factory, March 2012

- Location within South Carolina Location within the United States
- Location: 215 Chatham St. and 130 W. White St., Rock Hill, South Carolina
- Coordinates: 34°55′42″N 81°1′39″W
- Area: 4 acres (1.6 ha)
- Built: 1881, 1909
- Built by: Holler, Capt. A.D.
- Architectural style: Late Victorian
- MPS: Rock Hill MPS
- NRHP reference No.: 92000658, 08000156 (Boundary Increase)
- Added to NRHP: June 10, 1992, March 6, 2008 (Boundary Increase)

Rock Hill Cotton Factory, also known as Plej's Textile Mill Outlets, Ostrow Textile Mill, and Fewell Cotton Warehouse, is a historic textile mill complex located at Rock Hill, South Carolina. The mill was built in 1881, and is a two-story, 12 bay by 16 bay, brick factory. It features a three-story tower at the main entrance. A number of additions have been made to the building. The Fewell Cotton Warehouse is a one-story, brick and wood frame warehouse built before 1894.

It was listed on the National Register of Historic Places in 1992, with a boundary increase in 2008. The building is now used as a retail and office place known as the Cotton Factory Plaza.
