= McCorkle-Fewell-Long House =

Historic house in South Carolina, United States

- U.S. National Register of Historic Places
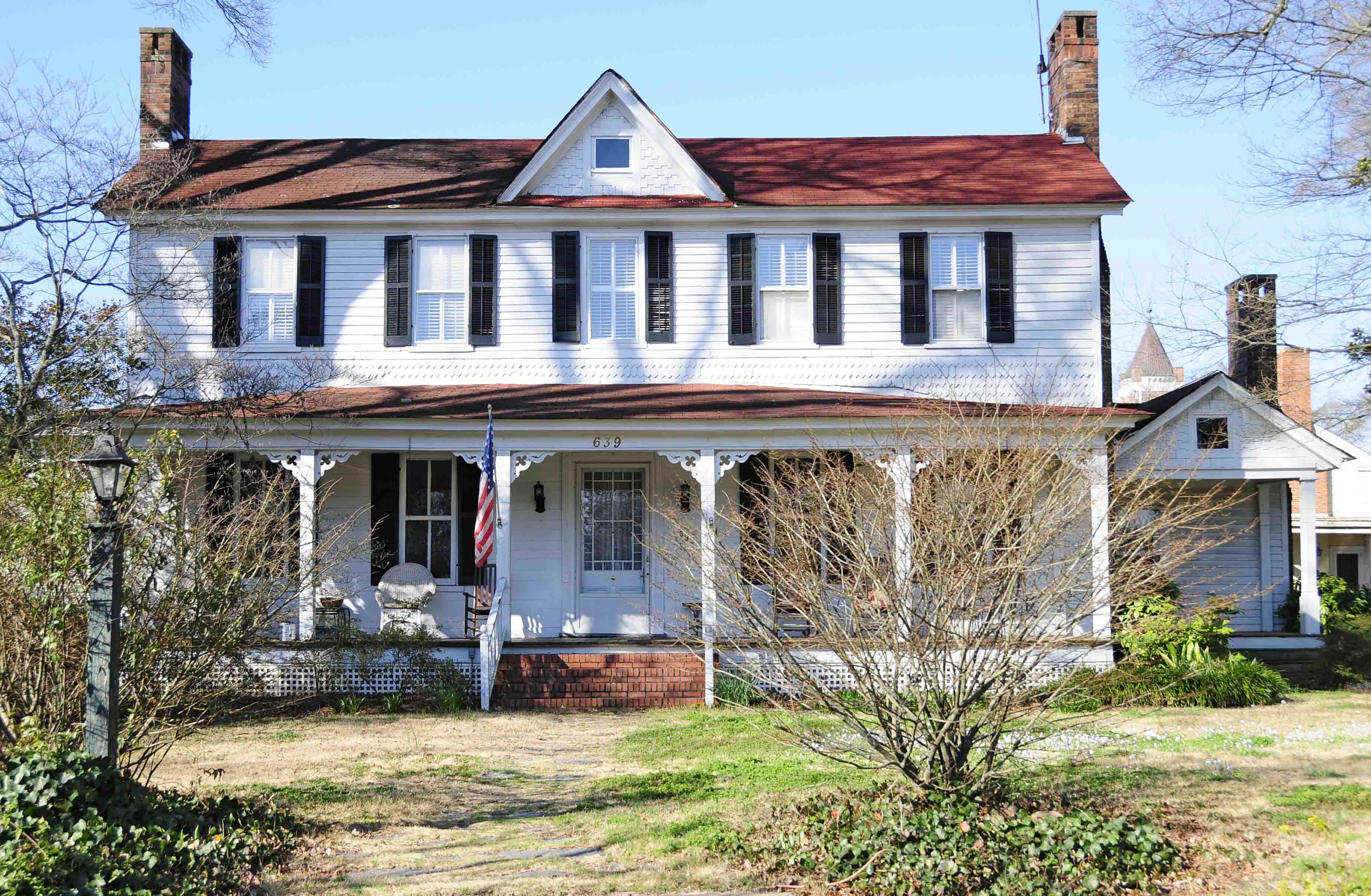
- McCorkle-Fewell-Long House, March 2012

- Location within South Carolina Location within the United States
- Location: 639 College Ave., Rock Hill, South Carolina
- Coordinates: 34°56′30″N 81°1′36″W
- Area: 1 acre (0.40 ha)
- Built: c. 1821, c. 1880
- Built by: McCorkle, Stephen
- Architectural style: Queen Anne
- NRHP reference No.: 80003715
- Added to NRHP: August 21, 1980

McCorkle-Fewell-Long House is a historic home located at Rock Hill, South Carolina. It was built prior to 1821, and extensively rebuilt about 1880, incorporating Queen Anne style elements. It is a two-story, five bay dwelling of heavy timber-frame construction sheathed with weatherboard and flushboard siding. It features a full-width front porch with square columns and decorative scrollwork. Located to the rear of the house is the former carriage house (c. 1900).

It was listed on the National Register of Historic Places in 1980.
