= Bleachery Water Treatment Plant =

- U.S. National Register of Historic Places
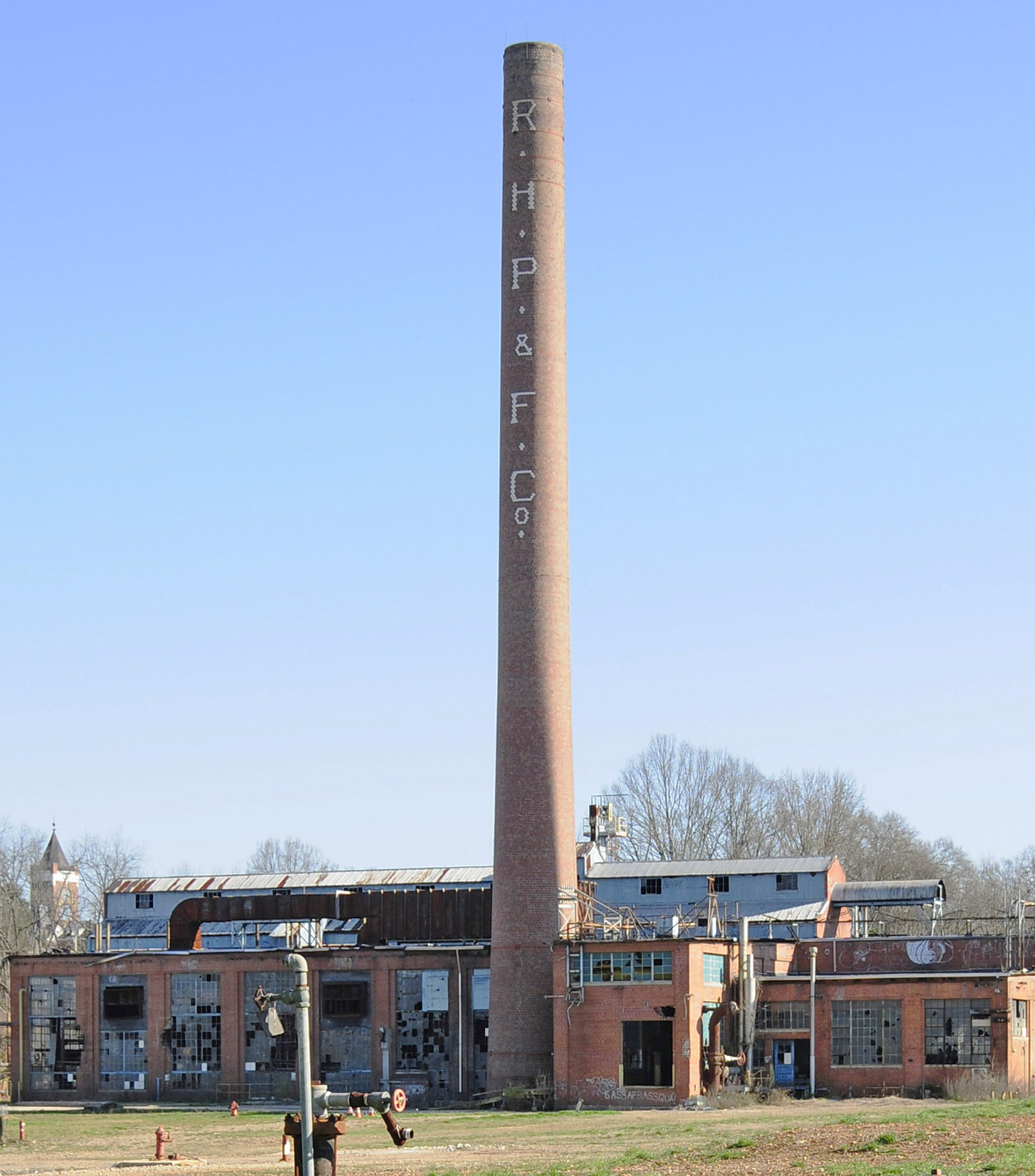

- Location within South Carolina Location within the United States
- Location: Stewart Ave., Rock Hill, South Carolina
- Coordinates: 34°56′06″N 81°1′53″W
- Area: 1 acre (0.40 ha)
- Built: 1930
- Built by: A.H. Guion Company
- Architectural style: Colonial Revival
- MPS: Rock Hill MPS
- NRHP reference No.: 08000154
- Added to NRHP: March 6, 2008

Bleachery Water Treatment Plant is a historic water treatment plant located at Rock Hill, South Carolina. It was built in 1930, and is a one-story brick building and filtration/purification facility in the Colonial Revival style. The city of Rock Hill passed a bond issue to build Bleachery Water Treatment Plant, to support the Rock Hill Printing and Finishing Company investment by M. Lowenstein Company of New York.

It was listed on the National Register of Historic Places in 2008.
