= People's National Bank Building (Rock Hill, South Carolina) =

- U.S. National Register of Historic Places
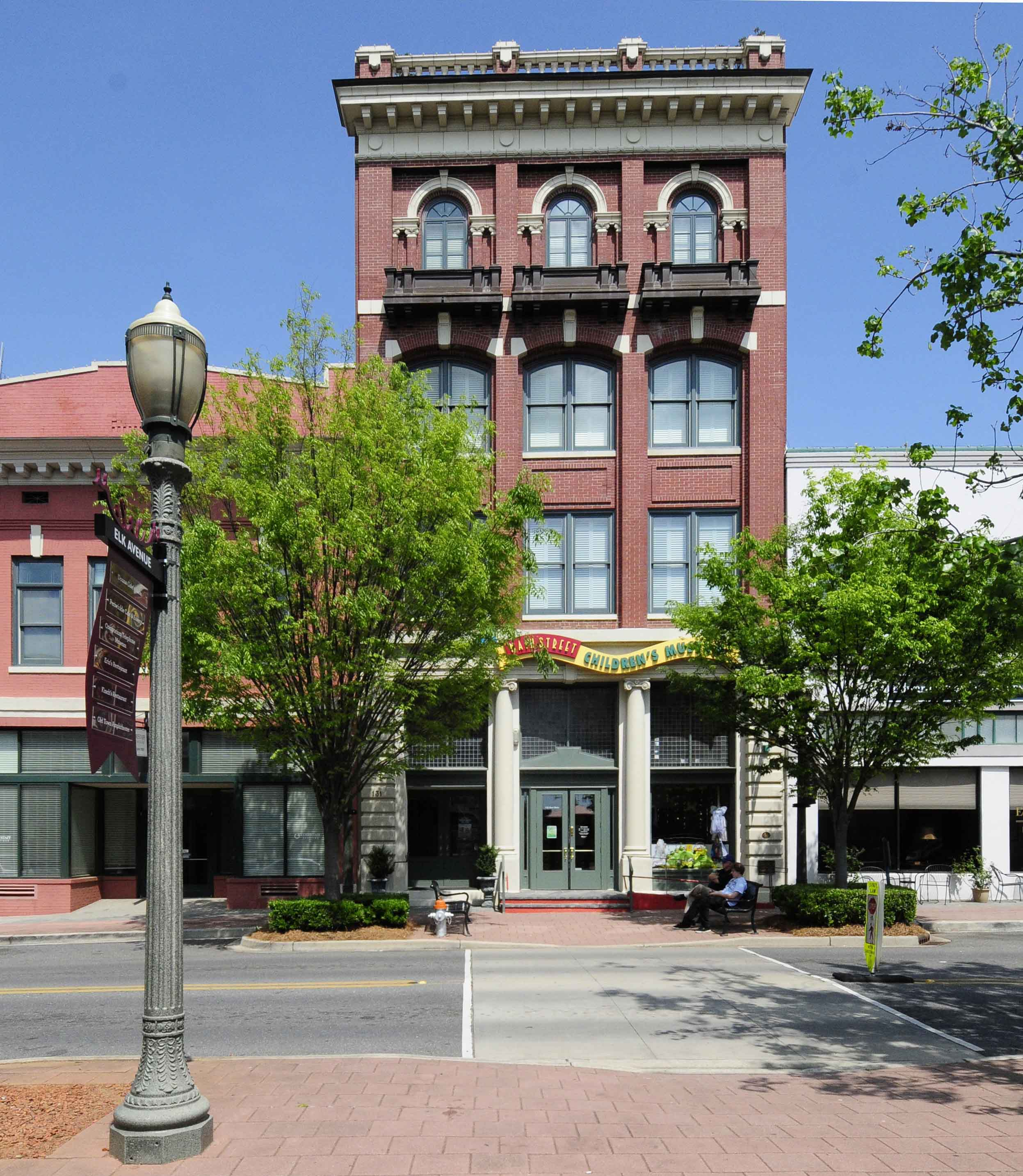
- People's National Bank Building, April 2012

- Location within South Carolina Location within the United States
- Location: 131-133 E. Main St., Rock Hill, South Carolina
- Coordinates: 34°55′32″N 81°1′37″W
- Area: less than one acre
- Built: c. 1909-1910
- Built by: Hartmann, C.C.
- Architect: Shand and Lafaye
- Architectural style: Late 19th And 20th Century Revivals
- NRHP reference No.: 99000396
- Added to NRHP: March 25, 1999

People's National Bank Building, also known as Franklin's Clothing Store, is a historic bank building located at Rock Hill, South Carolina. It was built about 1909–1910, and is a four-story brick building, plus basement. It was the first building in the city constructed as a speculative office building, the first with a passenger elevator, and the tallest commercial building in Rock Hill. The People's National Bank merged with Citizens and Southern National Bank of South Carolina in 1964 and moved out of the building in 1972.

It was listed on the National Register of Historic Places in 1999.
