= Rock Hill Body Company =

- U.S. National Register of Historic Places
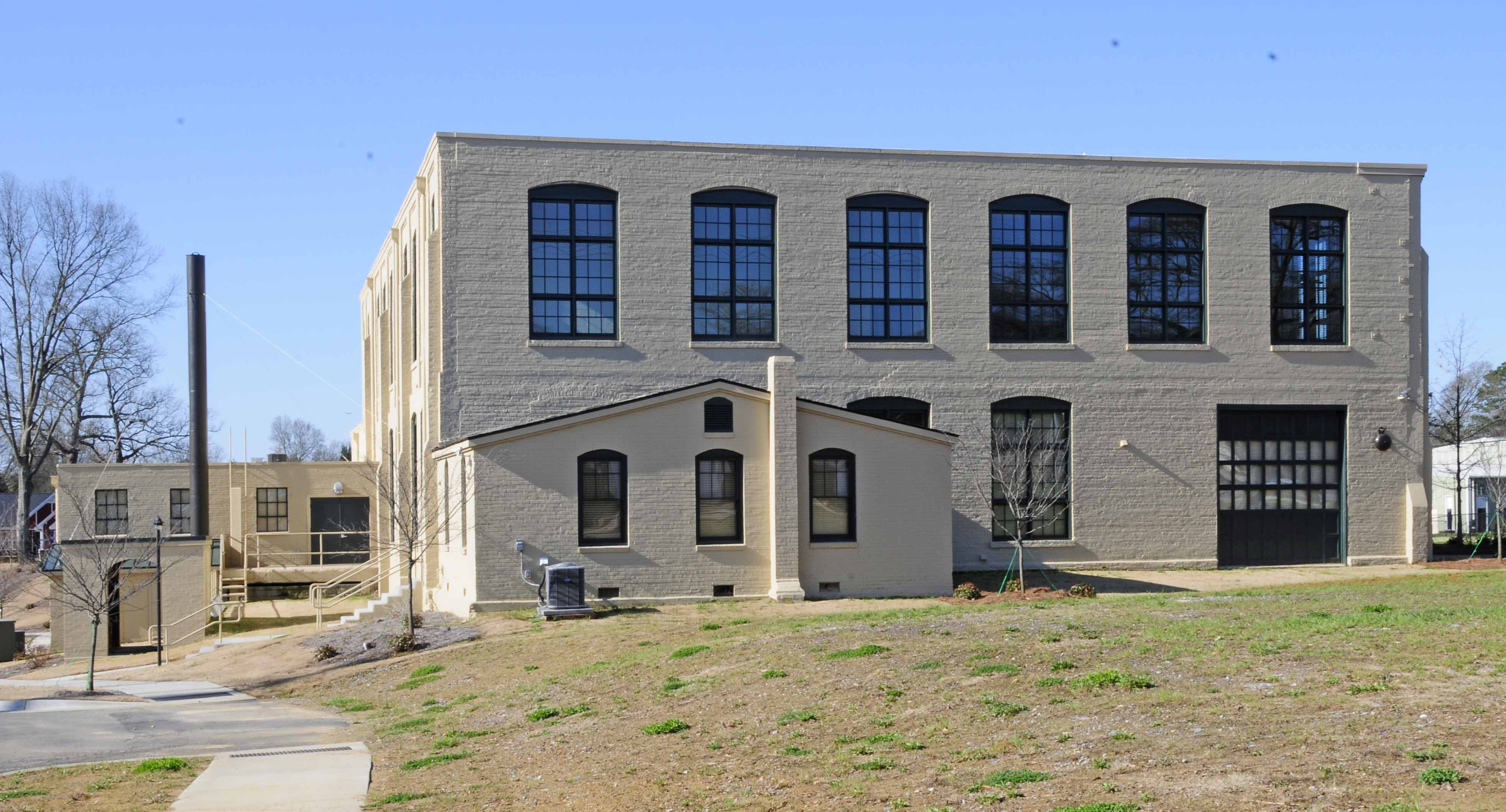
- Rock Hill Body Company, March 2012

- Location within South Carolina Location within the United States
- Location: 601 W. Main St., Rock Hill, South Carolina
- Coordinates: 34°55′55″N 81°2′11″W
- Area: 1 acre (0.40 ha)
- Built: c. 1915
- MPS: Rock Hill MPS
- NRHP reference No.: 08000155
- Added to NRHP: March 6, 2008

Rock Hill Body Company, originally known as Victoria Yarn Mill # 2, is a historic industrial building located at Rock Hill, South Carolina. It was built about 1915, and is a two-story brick industrial building built as a textile mill. Later modifications include a one-story office addition and an elevator tower addition on the rear. It was the home of the Rock Hill Body Company, one of the earliest makers of truck bodies and school bus bodies in South Carolina, from 1938 to 1986.

It was listed on the National Register of Historic Places in 2008.
