= Charlotte Avenue–Aiken Avenue Historic District =

Historic district in South Carolina, US

- U.S. National Register of Historic Places
- U.S. Historic district
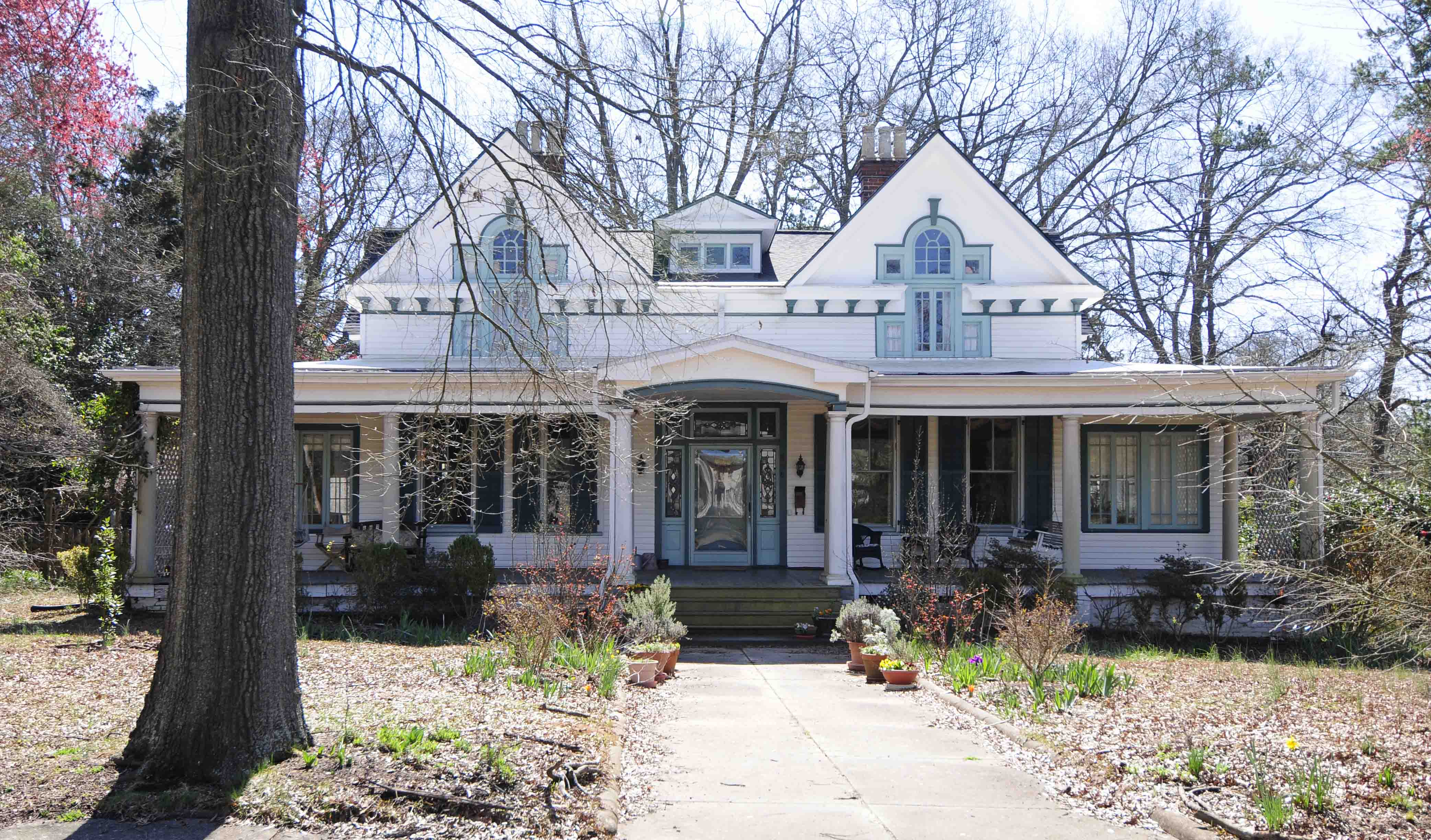
- Bays-Blackman House, Charlotte Avenue-Aiken Avenue Historic District, March 2012

- Location within South Carolina Location within the United States
- Location: Roughly, Aiken Ave. from College Ave. to Charlotte Ave. and Charlotte from Aiken to Union Ave., Rock Hill, South Carolina
- Coordinates: 34°56′09″N 81°1′28″W
- Area: 4.5 acres (1.8 ha)
- Architectural style: Classical Revival, Bungalow/craftsman, Queen Anne
- MPS: Rock Hill MPS
- NRHP reference No.: 92000659
- Added to NRHP: June 10, 1992

Charlotte Avenue–Aiken Avenue Historic District is a national historic district located at Rock Hill, South Carolina. It encompasses seven contributing dwellings in the Oakland section of Rock Hill. The district developed between about 1891 and 1935. Architectural styles represented include Classical Revival, Queen Anne, and Bungalow. Contributing buildings are the Hughes Walker House, Paul D. Farris House, Roy Z. Thomas House, Wilson House (Ark of the Covenant), Armstrong-Mauldin House, and Bays-Blackman House.

It was listed on the National Register of Historic Places in 1992.
