= Highland Park Manufacturing Plant and Cotton Oil Complex =

Historic district in South Carolina, United States

- U.S. National Register of Historic Places
- U.S. Historic district
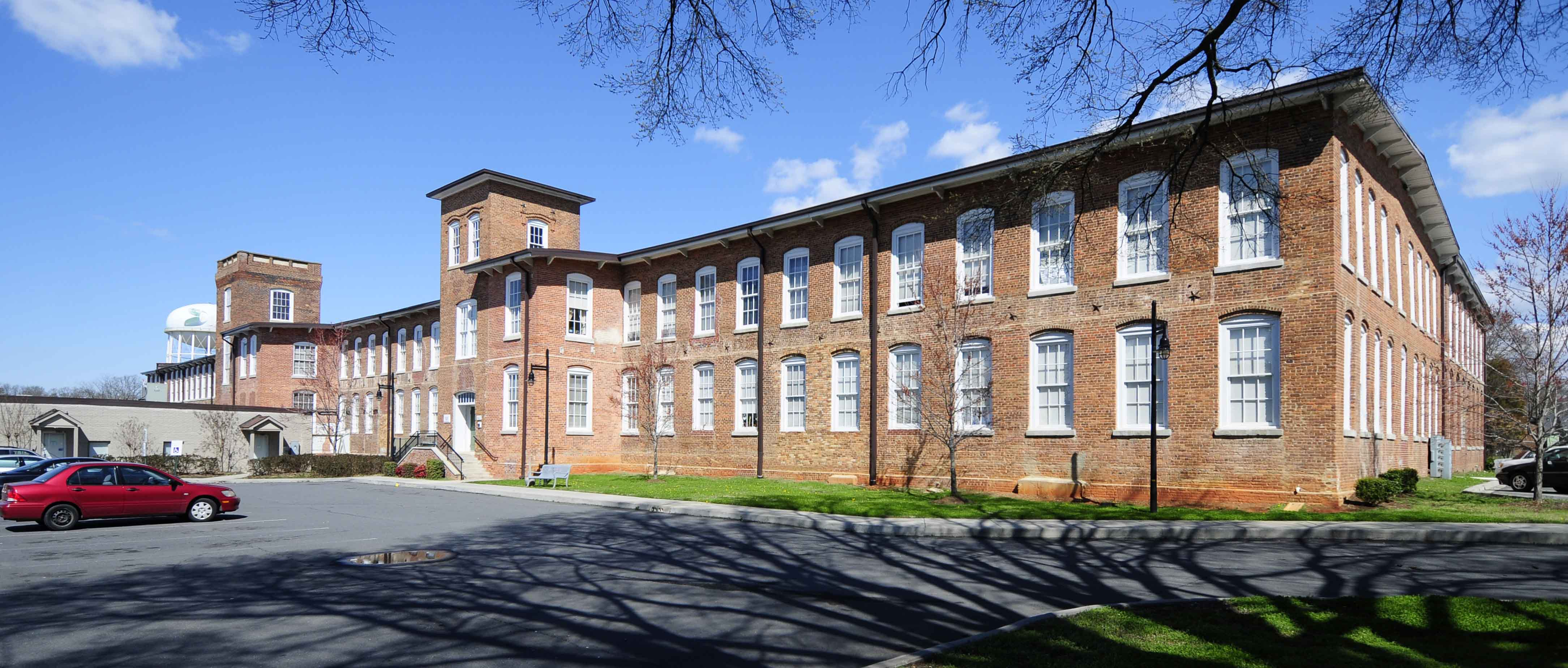
- Highland Park Manufacturing Plant, March 2012

- Location within South Carolina Location within the United States
- Location: 869 Standard St., 732 and 737 E. White St., Rock Hill, South Carolina
- Coordinates: 34°55′15″N 81°0′42″W
- Area: 10 acres (4.0 ha)
- Built: 1902
- Built by: Holler, Capt. A.D.
- Architectural style: Late Victorian
- MPS: Rock Hill MPS
- NRHP reference No.: 92000655
- Added to NRHP: June 10, 1992

Highland Park Manufacturing Plant and Cotton Oil Complex is a historic industrial complex and national historic district located at Rock Hill, South Carolina. It encompasses three contributing building and two contributing structures in Rock Hill. The complex includes the Highland Park Manufacturing Plant (1888–89, 1907), the Highland Park Cotton Oil Mill (1902), and the Highland Park Cotton Oil Mill Office (1902). They are the surviving buildings of a larger complex, including a gin and seed house, the rest of which have been demolished. Surrounding the original mill are portions of the mill village. The mill operated until 1968.

It was listed on the National Register of Historic Places in 1992.
