= Tillman Hall =

- Tillman Hall at Winthrop University
- U.S. National Register of Historic Places
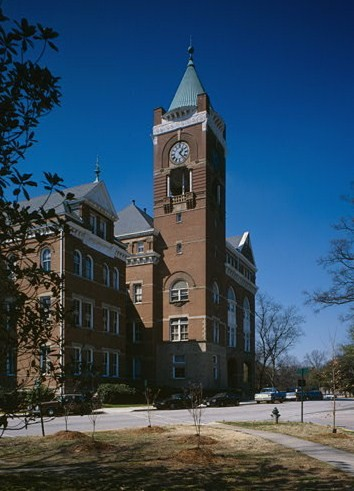
- Tillman Hall, HABS Photo, November 1986

- Location within South Carolina Location within the United States
- Location: Winthrop University campus, Rock Hill, South Carolina
- Area: <1 acre (0.40 ha)
- Built: 1894
- Architectural style: Richardsonian Romanesque
- NRHP reference No.: 77001235
- Added to NRHP: December 2, 1977

Tillman Hall, originally known as Main Building, is a historic academic building located on the campus of Winthrop University at Rock Hill, South Carolina, United States. It was built in 1894, and is a three-story, red brick building in the Richardsonian Romanesque style. The building includes a basement and attic, has a combination gabled and hipped roof configuration, projecting bay windows, and features a conical-roofed clock tower with open belfry. In 1962, Main Building was renamed Tillman Hall for governor, Democratic U.S. Senator, and avowed white supremacist Benjamin Tillman. Tillman Hall's Auditorium has hosted concerts by Frankie Valli and the Four Seasons in 1970, Jars of Clay in 1997, Florida's metal band Trivium in 2005, Celtic rock band Seven Nations in 2005, Recycled Percussion in 2007 and 2003, and pop folk pianist Vienna Teng in 2008. The 2008 direct-to-video horror film Asylum was filmed outside of and inside Tillman Hall. The ending of the 1999 horror film Carrie 2 was filmed at Tillman Hall.

It was listed on the National Register of Historic Places in 1977.

On June 19, 2020, Winthrop University's board of trustees passed unanimously a resolution requesting South Carolina state legislators to consider amending the Heritage Act of 2000 to "allow Winthrop to restore Tillman Hall to its original name of Main Building."
