= Withers Building =

- U.S. National Register of Historic Places
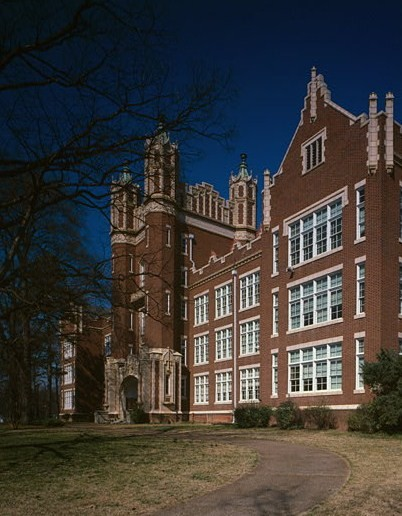
- Withers Building in 1986

- Location within South Carolina Location within the United States
- Location: Rock Hill, South Carolina
- Coordinates: 34°56′28″N 81°1′42″W
- Built: 1891, 1912–1913
- Architect: 1891, unknown; 1912–1916, William Augustus Edwards of Edwards & Sayward
- Architectural style: Gothic Revival
- NRHP reference No.: 81000571
- Added to NRHP: August 20, 1981

The Withers Building, also known as the Winthrop Training School or W.T.S., is an historic building complex located at 611 Myrtle Drive on the campus of Winthrop University in Rock Hill, South Carolina. The complex consists of three parts: the old Presbyterian High School, the Main Classroom - Office Building and the new Gymnasium.

The old two-story Presbyterian High School was built in 1891 and bought in 1910 by the state for what was then Winthrop College: The South Carolina College for Women to be used as its teacher training school.

The three-story E-shaped plan Main Classroom - Office Building with a central four-story tower was built in 1912–1913 and designed in the redbrick Gothic Revival style by the noted Atlanta-based architect William Augustus Edwards of the firm of Edwards and Sayward. This is the most architecturally significant part of the complex.

The new gymnasium building was built in 1952 and designed by G. Thomas Harmon of Columbia to replace the old gymnasium which had been on the fourth floor of the tower.

In 1960 the Winthrop Training School was named the Withers Building to honor Sarah Withers a graduate of the college and a former principal of the school.

On August 20, 1981, the Withers Building was added to the National Register of Historic Places.

Winthrop Theatre Productions:

2008-2009 Season: Remnants of Desire, Step on a Crack, Love Moves, Anything Goes (Cole Porter musical), Deer and the Antelope Play, On the Verge

2007-2008 Season: Stop Kiss, Antigone (Sophocles play) (tragedy), Dead Man Walking (by actor Tim Robbins), The Shape of Things, Shiloh Rules, Baby With the Bathwater, Edward II (play)

2006-2007 Season: The Complete Works of Shakespeare (Abridged), Summer and Smoke (Tennessee Williams), Rashōmon (short story), The Effect of Gamma Rays on Man-in-the-Moon Marigolds, Oklahoma!, Messiah on the Frigidaire, To Gillian on Her 37th Birthday

2005-2006 Season: The Book of Liz, The Jungle Book, Twilight: Los Angeles, 1992 (by black playwright Anna Deavere Smith) Travels with My Aunt (play) (Graham Greene), Cyrano de Bergerac (play), Boston Marriage (play), Much Ado About Nothing (Shakespeare comedy)

https://www.winthrop.edu/cvpa/THEATREDANCE/default.aspx?id=15100

== See also ==
- List of Registered Historic Places in South Carolina
- 820 Oakland Avenue - Winthrop Training School
