= Marion =

Marion or MARION may refer to:

== Arts and entertainment ==
- Marion (band), a British alternative rock group
- Marion (miniseries), a 1974 miniseries
- Marion (1920 film), an Italian silent film
- Marion (2024 film), a UK short

== People and fictional characters ==
- Marion (given name), a list of people and fictional characters with the given name
- Marion (surname), a list of people with the surname

== Places ==
=== Australia ===
- City of Marion, a local government area in South Australia
- Marion, South Australia, a suburb of Adelaide
  - Marion railway station

=== United States ===
- Marion, Alabama, a city
- Marion, Arkansas, a city
- Marion, Connecticut, a neighborhood of the town of Southington
- Marion, Georgia, an unincorporated community
- Marion, Illinois, a city
- Marion, Indiana, a city
  - Marion station (Amtrak), a former train station
  - Marion station (Pittsburgh, Cincinnati, Chicago and St. Louis Railroad), a former train station of the Pennsylvania Railroad
- Marion, Shelby County, Indiana, an unincorporated community
- Marion, Iowa, a city
  - Marion station (Iowa), a former train station
- Marion, Kansas, a city
- Marion, Kentucky, a home rule-class city
- Marion, Louisiana, a town
- Marion, Massachusetts, a town
- Marion Station, Maryland, an unincorporated community often referred to as just "Marion"
- Marion, Michigan, a village
- Marion, Minnesota, an unincorporated community
- Marion, Mississippi, a town
- Marion, Missouri, an unincorporated community
- Marion, Montana, a census-designated place and unincorporated community
- Marion, Nebraska, an unincorporated community
- Marion Section, a section of Jersey City, New Jersey
- Marion, New York, a town
- Marion (CDP), New York, a hamlet and census-designated place
- Marion, North Carolina, a city
- Marion, North Dakota, a city
- Marion, Ohio, the largest American city named Marion
  - Marion Union Station, a former passenger railway station
- Marion, Oregon, an unincorporated community
- Marion, Pennsylvania, an unincorporated community and census-designated place
- Marion, South Carolina, a city
- Marion, South Dakota, a city
- Marion, Texas, a city
- Marion, Utah, a census-designated place
- Marion, Virginia, a town
- Marion, Wetzel County, West Virginia
- Marion, Wisconsin, a city
- Marion, Grant County, Wisconsin, a town
- Marion, Juneau County, Wisconsin, a town
- Marion, Waushara County, Wisconsin, a town
- Marion County (disambiguation)
- Marion Township (disambiguation)
- Lake Marion (disambiguation), including Marion Lake and Marion Reservoir

=== Antarctica ===
- Marion Nunataks, Charcot Island, Antarctica

=== Cyprus ===
- Marion, Cyprus, an ancient city-state

=== South Africa ===
- Marion Island, one of the Prince Edward Islands, South Africa

== Schools ==
- Indiana Wesleyan University, once called Marion College
- Marion College (Missouri), a historical manual work college
- Marion College (Virginia), a defunct junior college
- Marion Military Institute, Marion, Alabama, the oldest military junior college in the United States
- Marion High School (disambiguation), various American high schools and one defunct Australian one

== Other uses ==
- United States Penitentiary, Marion, a federal prison for male inmates
- USS Marion, a Union Navy sloop-of-war during the American Civil War
- Marion Power Shovel Company, best known for building the crawler-transporters used to move launch vehicles at the Kennedy Space Center
- Westfield Marion, colloquially called simply "Marion", the largest shopping centre in Adelaide, South Australia
- MARION, formerly ACT Writers Centre, Australian organisation that awards the MARION Book Awards

== See also ==
- Marion Bay (disambiguation)
- Marion Historic District (disambiguation)
- Marian (disambiguation)
- Marijonas
