= List of places named for Francis Marion =

This is a list of places named after Francis Marion, a brigadier general from South Carolina in the American Revolutionary War. He had more places named after him than any other Revolutionary War soldier, with the exception of George Washington.

- Francis Marion National Forest, South Carolina
- Fort Marion (Modern Day Castillo de San Marcos Castillo de San Marcos in St. Augustine, FL)
- Francis Marion University, Florence, South Carolina
- Francis Marion Intermediate School, Marion, Iowa
- Francis Marion High School, Marion, Alabama
- Francis Marion Park, Georgetown, South Carolina
- Marion, Alabama
- Marion, Connecticut
- Marion, Georgia
- Marion, Idaho
- Marion, Illinois
- Marion, Indiana
- Marion, Iowa
- Marion, Louisiana
- Marion, Kansas
- Marion, Kentucky
- Marion, Maine
- Marion Station, Maryland
- Marion, Massachusetts
- Marion, Michigan
- Marion Military Institute, Marion, Al.
- Marion, Minnesota
- Marion, Mississippi
- Marionville, Missouri
- Marion, Montana
- Marion, Nebraska
- Marion, New Jersey
- East Marion, New York
- Marion, New York
- Mount Marion, New York
- Marion, North Carolina
- Marion, North Dakota
- Marion, Ohio
- Marion, Oregon
- Marion, Pennsylvania
- Marion Center, Pennsylvania
- Marion Heights, Pennsylvania
- Point Marion, Pennsylvania
- Marion, South Carolina
- Marion, South Dakota
- Marion, Virginia
- Marion, Wisconsin
- Marion County, Alabama
- Marion County, Arkansas
- Marion County, Florida
- Marion County, Georgia
- Marion County, Illinois

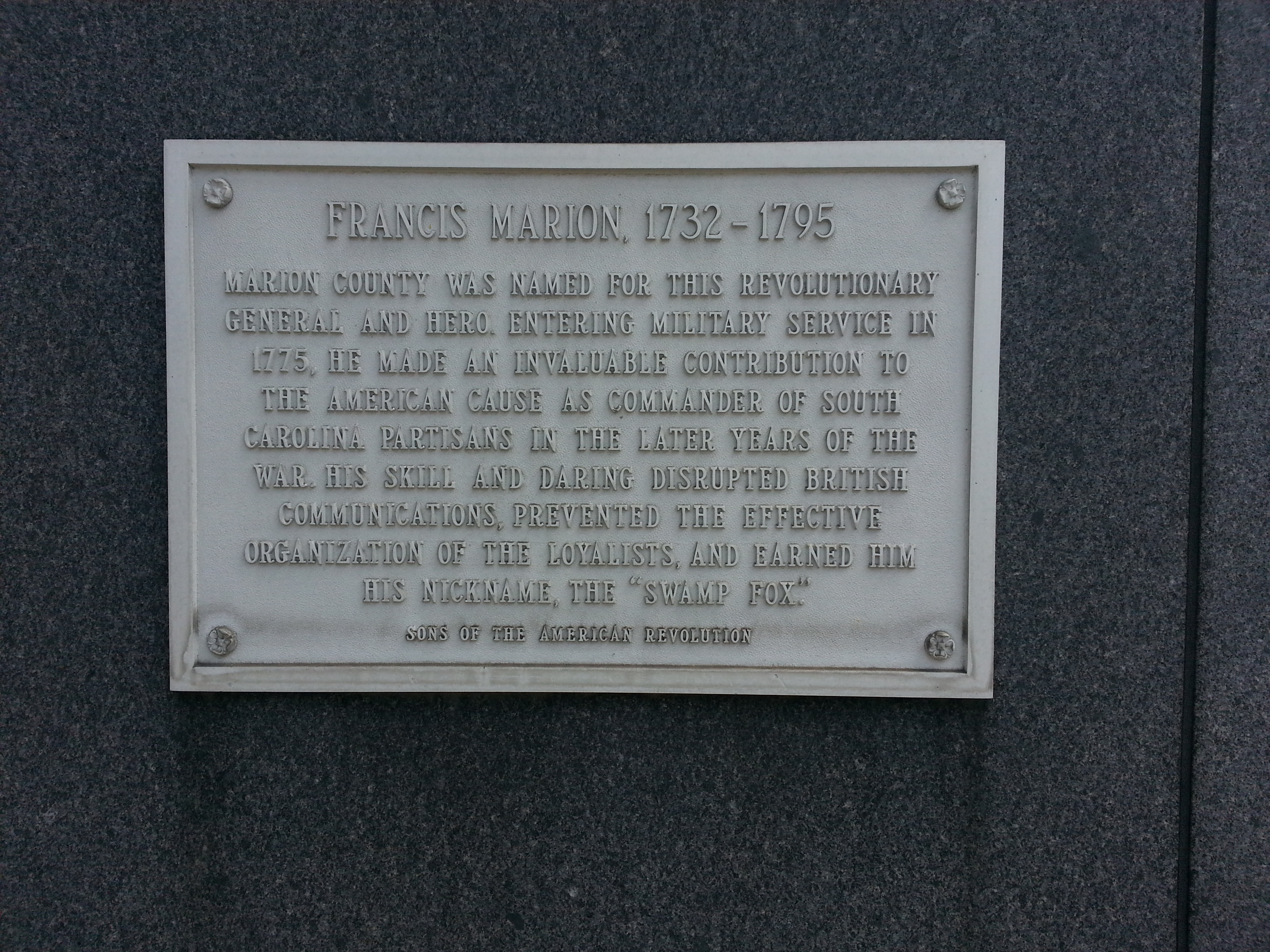
Sign on the county government building commemorating Francis Marion, who Marion County, Indiana was named for.

- Marion County, Indiana
- Marion County, Iowa
- Marion County, Kansas
- Marion County, Kentucky
- Marion County, Mississippi
- Marion County, Missouri
- Marion County, Ohio
- Marion County, Oregon
- Marion County, South Carolina
- Marion County, Tennessee
- Marion County, Texas
- Marion County, West Virginia
- Marion Park, Washington, DC
- Marion Square, Charleston, South Carolina
- Marion Township, Arkansas (disambiguation) (7 different counties have a Marion Township)
- Marion Township, Michigan (disambiguation) (5 different counties have a Marion Township)
- Marion Township, Pennsylvania (disambiguation) (4 different counties have a Marion Township)
- Francis Marion Hotel, Charleston, South Carolina
- Swamp Fox Roller Coaster, Myrtle Beach, South Carolina
- Swamp Fox Hotel, now called Compass Cove, Myrtle Beach, South Carolina
- Swamp Fox HWY, running from Tabor City, North Carolina, to Pireway, North Carolina
- Lake Marion, South Carolina
- Marion Lake, Minnesota
- Marion Lake, Oregon
- Marion & Hopkinson Playground, on Marion Street, in Brooklyn, New York
