= Maryon =

Maryon may refer to:

- Maryon Wilson Park in Charlton, London, UK
- Maryon Park in Charlton, London, UK
- Maryon-Wilson baronets in Sussex, UK
- Maryon (given name)
- Maryon Gargiulo, French singer who represented Monaco in the Eurovision Song Contest 2004
- Maryon (surname)

== See also ==
- Marion (disambiguation)
