= Marion Township, Indiana =

Marion Township is the name of twelve townships in the U.S. state of Indiana:

- Marion Township, Allen County, Indiana
- Marion Township, Boone County, Indiana
- Marion Township, Decatur County, Indiana
- Marion Township, Dubois County, Indiana
- Marion Township, Hendricks County, Indiana
- Marion Township, Jasper County, Indiana
- Marion Township, Jennings County, Indiana
- Marion Township, Lawrence County, Indiana
- Marion Township, Owen County, Indiana
- Marion Township, Pike County, Indiana
- Marion Township, Putnam County, Indiana
- Marion Township, Shelby County, Indiana

== See also ==
- Marion Township (disambiguation)
