= Marion micropolitan area =

The Marion micropolitan area may refer to:

- The Marion, Indiana micropolitan area, United States
- The Marion, North Carolina micropolitan area, United States
- The Marion, Ohio micropolitan area, United States

== See also ==
- Marion (disambiguation)
