= Maryon (given name) =

Maryon is a given name. Notable people with the given name include:

- Maryon Eilertsen (1950–2015), Norwegian actress and theatre director
- Maryon Kantaroff (1933–2019), Canadian sculptor
- Maryon Lane (1933–2008), South African ballet dancer
- Maryon Pearson (1901–1989), Canadian wife of Prime Minister
- Maryon Pittman Allen (1925–2018), American journalist
- Maryon Stewart, English women health writer
- Maryon Vadie (1895–1975), American dancer

== See also ==
- Maryon (surname)
