= Marion Township, Illinois =

Marion Township may refer to the following places in the U.S. state of Illinois:

- Marion Township, Lee County, Illinois
- Marion Township, Ogle County, Illinois

== See also ==
- Marion Township (disambiguation)
