= Marion Historic District =

Marion Historic District may refer to:

- Marion Courthouse Square Historic District, Marion, Alabama
- Marion Historic District (Cheshire and Southington, Connecticut)
- Marion Downtown Commercial Historic District, Marion, Indiana
- Marion Historic District (Marion, South Carolina)
- Marion Street Area Historic District, Rock Hill, South Carolina
- Marion Historic District (Marion, Virginia)

== See also ==
- West Marion Historic District, Marion, Alabama
