= Jean-Baptiste Donatien de Vimeur, comte de Rochambeau =

French Royal Army officer (1725–1807)

Jean-Baptiste Donatien de Vimeur de Rochambeau
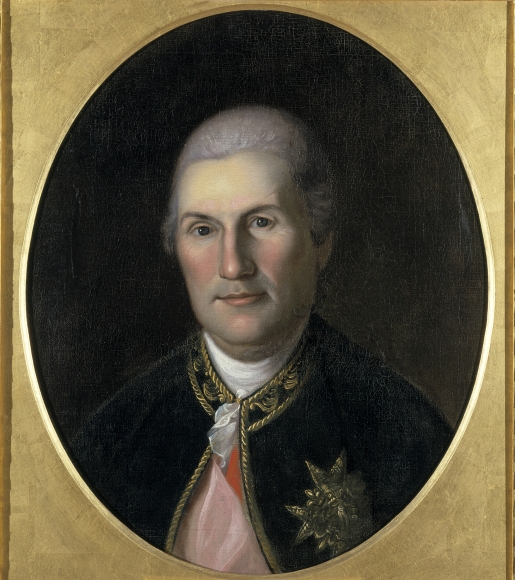
- Portrait by Charles Willson Peale, 1782
- Born: 1 July 1725; Vendôme, Orléanais, France
- Died: 30 May 1807 (aged 81); Thoré, Loir-et-Cher, France
- Relatives: Donatien de Rochambeau (son)
- Military career
- Allegiance: France
- Branch: French Royal Army
- Service years: 1742–1792
- Conflicts: War of the Austrian Succession; Siege of Maastricht; Seven Years' War; Battle of Minorca; Battle of Krefeld; Battle of Corbach; Battle of Kloster Kampen; American Revolutionary War; Yorktown campaign; Washington–Rochambeau Revolutionary Route; Battle of the Chesapeake; Siege of Yorktown; French Revolutionary Wars; War of the First Coalition
- Awards: Order of the Holy Spirit; Order of Saint Louis; Society of the Cincinnati

Jean-Baptiste Donatien de Vimeur, comte de Rochambeau (French: [ʒɑ̃ batist dɔnɑsjɛ̃ də vimœʁ, kɔ̃t də ʁɔʃɑ̃bo]; 1 July 1725 – 10 May 1807) was a French Royal Army officer who played a critical role in the American victory at the siege of Yorktown in 1781 during the American Revolutionary War. He was commander-in-chief of the Expédition Particulière, the French expeditionary force sent to North America during the conflict. He worked closely and well with George Washington, commander-in-chief of the Continental Army.

== Military life ==
Jean-Baptiste Donatien de Vimeur, or Rochambeau, was born in Vendôme, in the province of Orléanais, and he was educated at the Jesuit college in Blois. After the death of his elder brother, he entered a cavalry regiment and served in Bohemia, Bavaria, and on the Rhine during the War of the Austrian Succession. By 1747, he had attained the rank of colonel. He took part in the Siege of Maastricht and became governor of Vendôme in 1749. He distinguished himself in the Battle of Minorca on the outbreak of the Seven Years' War and was promoted to brigadier general of infantry. In 1758, he fought in Germany, notably in the Battle of Krefeld and the Battle of Clostercamp, receiving several wounds at Clostercamp.

== American Revolution ==
In 1780, Rochambeau was appointed commander of land forces as part of the project code-named Expédition Particulière. He was given the rank of lieutenant general in command of 7,000 French troops and sent to join the Continental Army under George Washington during the American Revolutionary War. Axel von Fersen the Younger served as his aide-de-camp and interpreter. The small size of the force at his disposal made him initially reluctant to lead the expedition.

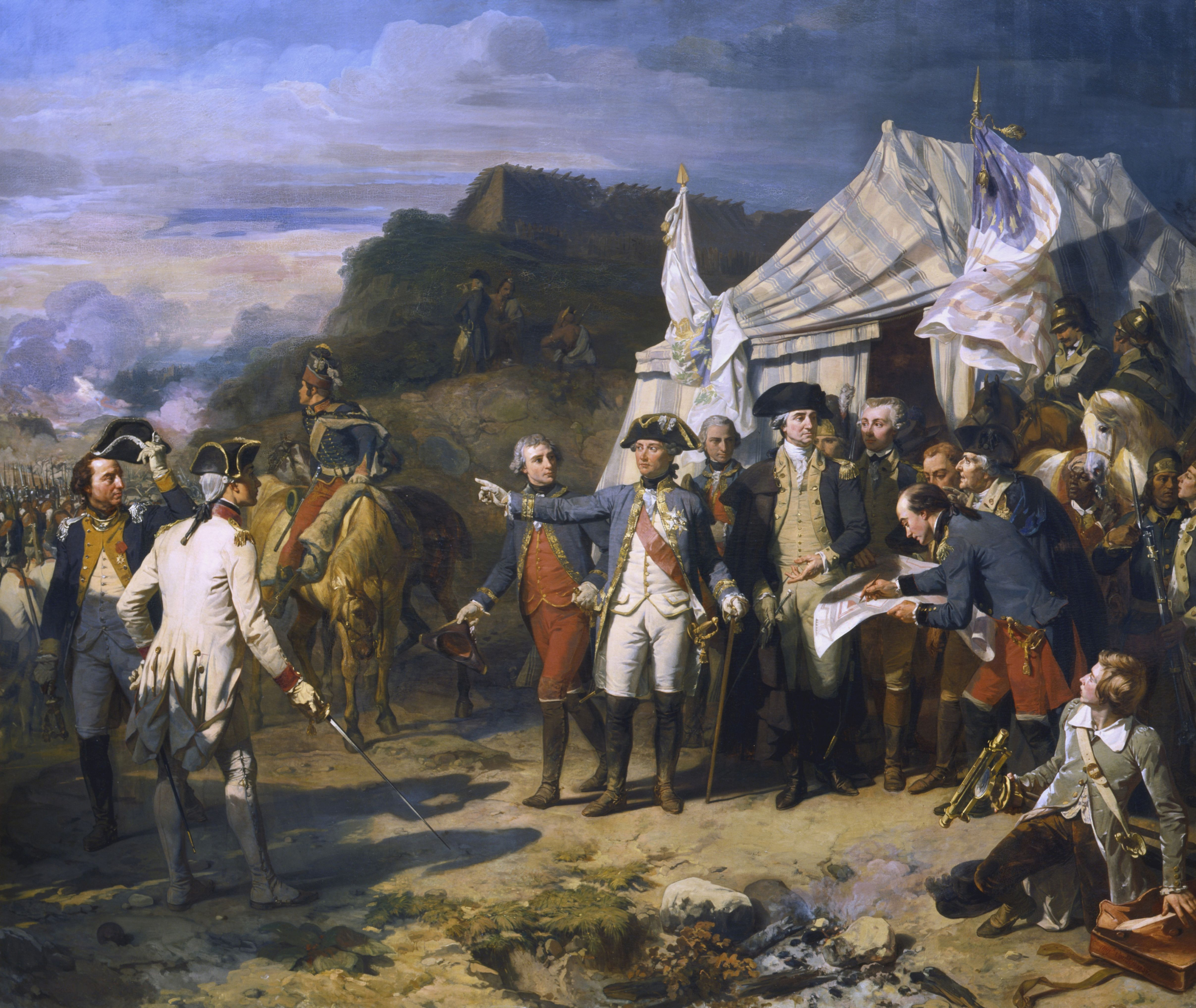
Bataille de Yorktown by Auguste Couder; Rochambeau stands at the center of the painting, with Washington beside him

He landed at Newport, Rhode Island, on 10 July but was held there inactive for a year because he did not want to abandon the French fleet blockaded by the British in Narragansett Bay. The college in the Colony of Rhode Island and Providence Plantations (now Brown University) served as an encampment site for some of Rochambeau's troops. The college edifice was converted into a military hospital, now known as University Hall. In July 1781, the force left Rhode Island and marched across Connecticut to join Washington on the Hudson River in Mount Kisco, New York. The Odell farm served as Rochambeau's headquarters from 6 July to 18 August 1781.

Washington and Rochambeau then marched their combined forces to the Siege of Yorktown and the Battle of the Chesapeake. On 22 September they combined with the Marquis de Lafayette's troops and forced Lord Cornwallis to surrender on 19 October. The Congress of the Confederation presented Rochambeau with two cannons taken from the British in recognition of his service. He returned them to Vendôme, and they were requisitioned in 1792.

== Return to France ==
Upon his return to France, Rochambeau was honored by King Louis XVI and was made governor of the province of Picardy. He supported the French Revolution of 1789, and on 28 December 1791 he and Nicolas Luckner became the last two generals created Marshal of France by Louis XVI.

When the French Revolutionary Wars broke out, he commanded the Armée du Nord for a time in 1792 but resigned after several reversals to the Austrians. He was arrested during the Reign of Terror in 1793–94 and imprisoned in the Conciergerie. He narrowly avoided the guillotine, with his execution being scheduled mere days away when the Thermidorian Reaction occurred, ending the Reign of Terror.

== Later life and death ==
After his imprisonment and subsequent release, Rochambeau met with Napoleon in 1801 and was given a pension. He later received the Légion d'honneur in 1804 after Napoleon's accession as emperor. Rochambeau died in 1807 at Thoré-la-Rochette during the First French Empire. His son Donatien was also a French general.

== Legacy ==
=== Commemoration ===
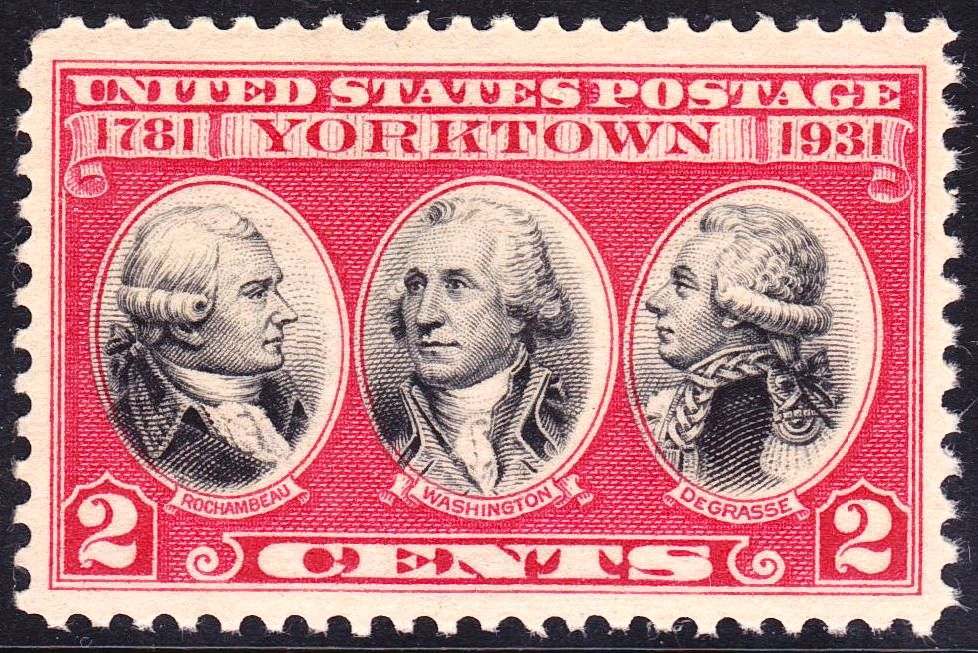
US postage stamp, 1931 issue, honoring Rochambeau, George Washington, and François Joseph Paul de Grasse, commemorating 150th anniversary of the victory at Yorktown, 1781

President Theodore Roosevelt unveiled a statue of Rochambeau by Ferdinand Hamar as a gift from France to the United States on 24 May 1902, standing in Lafayette Square, Washington, D.C. The ceremony was a great demonstration of friendship between the two nations. France was represented by ambassador Jules Cambon, Admiral Fournier, General Henri Brugère, and a detachment of sailors and marines from the battleship Gaulois. Representatives of the Lafayette and Rochambeau families also attended. A Rochambeau fête was held simultaneously in Paris. In 1934, A. Kingsley Macomber donated a statue of Rochambeau to Newport, Rhode Island. The sculpture is a replica of a statue in Paris. There is a Rochambeau monument at French Hill in Marion, Connecticut, close to the Asa Barnes Tavern, the eighth campsite of his troops through Connecticut in 1781.

In 1867, the French Navy named a casemate ironclad frigate Rochambeau. In 1911, CGT named a transatlantic liner Rochambeau. In 1942, the US Navy named a troopship USS Rochambeau. In 2009, President Barack Obama signed the Omnibus Public Land Management Act with a provision to designate the Washington–Rochambeau Revolutionary Route as a national historic trail. A bridge was named for Rochambeau in the complex of bridges known as the 14th Street Bridge (Potomac River) connecting Washington, D.C., with Virginia. A mansion on the campus of Brown University is named Rochambeau House and houses the French Department.

=== Memoirs ===
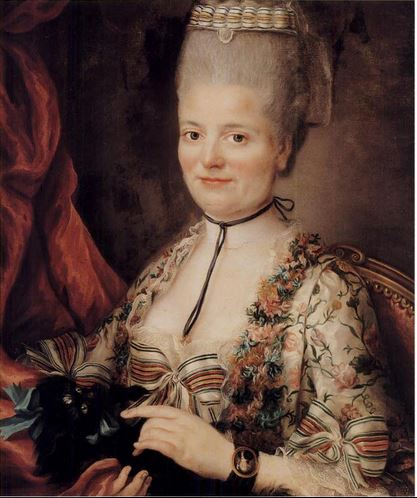
Jeanne Therese Tilles D'Acosta, Madame la Marquise de Rochambeau

Rochambeau's Mémoires militaires, historiques et politiques, de Rochambeau was published by Jean-Charles-Julien Luce de Lancival in 1809. Part of the first volume was translated into English and published in 1838 under the title Memoirs of the Marshal Count de R. relative to the War of Independence in the United States. His correspondence during the American campaign was published in 1892 in H. Doniol's History of French Participation in the Establishment of the United States.

== Motto and coat of arms ==
Coat of arms	Motto
	VIVRE EN PREUX, Y MOURIR (To live and die valiantly)
