= Lake Marion =

Lake Marion or Marion Lake may refer to:

Canada

- Marion Lake (Alberta), a street in Botha, Alberta

United States

- Marion Lake (Arkansas), a lake in Crittenden County
- Marion County Lake, a lake in Marion County, Kansas
- Marion Reservoir, a reservoir in Marion County, Kansas
- Marion Lake (Dakota County, Minnesota)
- Lake Marion (McLeod County, Minnesota)
- Marion Lake (Montana), a lake in Flathead County
- Marion Lake (Oregon), a lake in Linn County
- Lake Marion (South Carolina), a reservoir formed by an impoundment on the Santee River
- Marion Lake (Teton County, Wyoming), a lake
