= Barnes-Frost House =

Historic house in Connecticut, United States

- Barnes--Frost House
- U.S. National Register of Historic Places
- U.S. Historic district – Contributing property
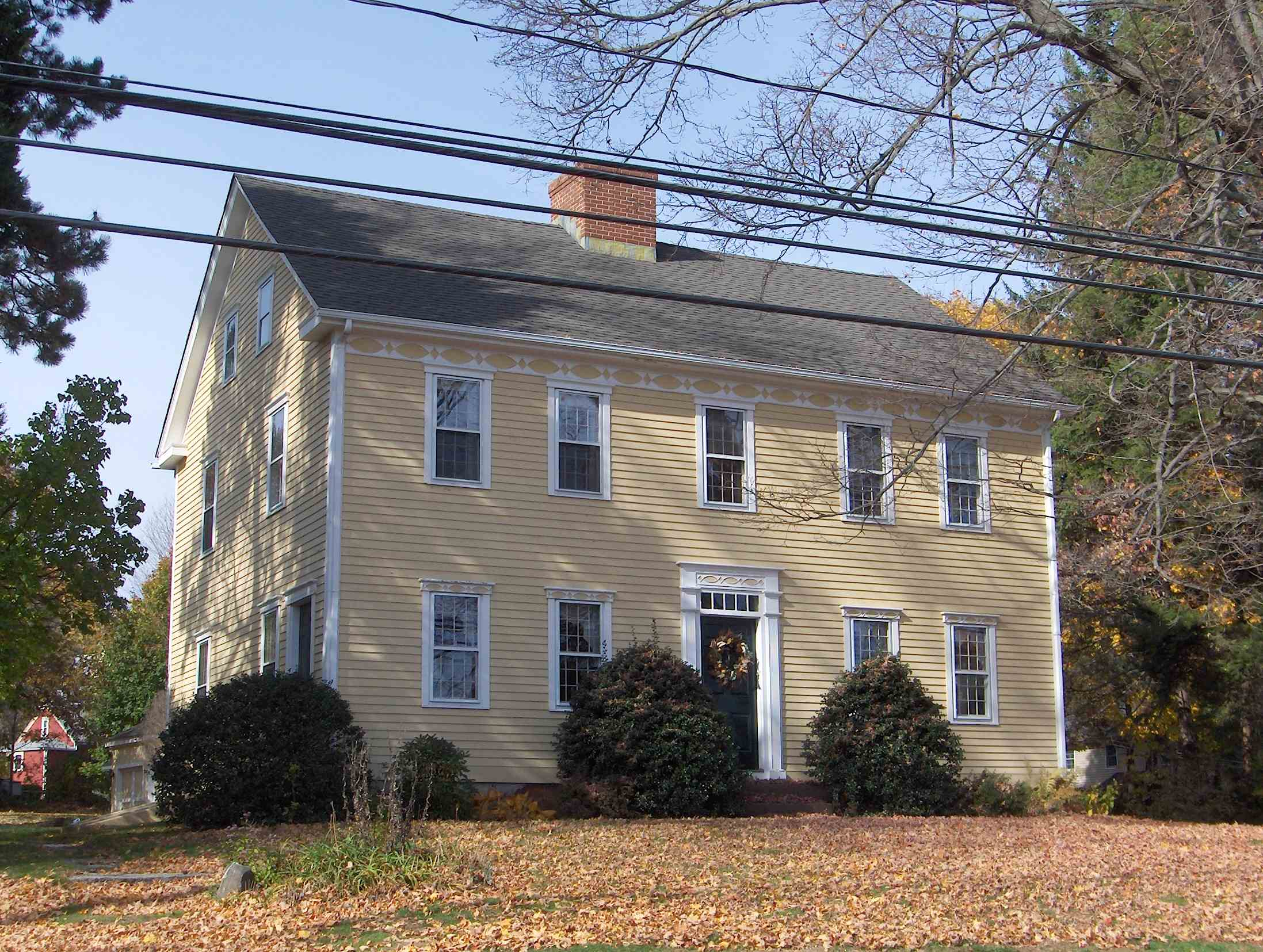

- Location within Connecticut Location within the United States
- Location: 1177 Marion Avenue, Southington, Connecticut
- Coordinates: 41°33′56″N 72°55′31″W
- Area: 1.2 acres (0.49 ha)
- Built: 1795
- Architectural style: Colonial, New England Colonial
- Part of: Marion Historic District (ID88001423)
- MPS: Colonial Houses of Southington TR
- NRHP reference No.: 88003109

Significant dates
- Added to NRHP: January 19, 1989
- Designated CP: December 21, 1988

The Barnes-Frost House is a historic house at 1177 Marion Avenue in the Marion section of Southington, Connecticut. Built about 1795, it is a high quality local example of late Colonial architecture, with a history of ownership by members of prominent local families. It was listed on the National Register of Historic Places in 1989.

== Description and history ==
The Barnes-Frost House is located on the west side of Marion Avenue, north of its junction with Old Mountain Road (Connecticut Route 322). It is a 2 1/2-story wood-frame structure, five bays wide, with a clapboarded exterior, side gable roof, large central chimney, and a centered entrance. The entrance is flanked by pilasters and topped by a frieze with a band of molded ellipses. This detail is repeated on the window lintels and in a frieze band below the roof line. The chimney is not original to the house, but is an 18th-century structure recovered from a house in Cheshire. The interior retains some original features, notably wide pine floors.

Built c. 1796, the house is significant in part because it is a well-preserved example of Colonial architecture, and also because it was home of the locally prominent Barnes and Frost families. Philo Barnes, son of the locally prominent tavernkeeper Asa Barnes and a major local landowner in his own right, purchased the house in 1810, and it was occupied by three generations of Barneses. In 1881 it was purchased by Levi Frost, also from a prominent local family that owned a local factory. The house remained in the Frost family until 1916.

== See also ==
- National Register of Historic Places listings in Southington, Connecticut
