= Marion High School =

Marion High School may refer to:

== United States ==
- Marion High School (Alabama), Marion, Alabama
- Marion High School (Arkansas), Marion, Arkansas
- Marion High School (Illinois), Marion, Illinois
- Marion High School (Indiana), Marion, Indiana
- Marion High School (Iowa), Marion, Iowa
- Marion High School (Kansas), Marion, Kansas
- Marion High School (Louisiana), Marion, Louisiana
- Marian High School (Bloomfield Hills, Michigan)
- Marion High School (Marion, Michigan)
- Marion Local High School, Maria Stein, Ohio
- Marion High School (South Carolina), Marion, South Carolina
- Marion High School (South Dakota), Marion, South Dakota
- Marion High School (Texas), Marion, Texas
- Marion Senior High School (Virginia), Marion, Virginia
- Marion High School (Wisconsin), Marion, Wisconsin
- Marion County High School (disambiguation)

== Australia ==
- Marion High School (South Australia), Clovelly Park, South Australia (closed in 1996)

== See also ==
- East Marion High School, Columbia, Mississippi
- North Marion High School (Florida), Citra, Florida
- North Marion High School (Aurora, Oregon)
- North Marion High School (West Virginia), Rachel, West Virginia
- West Marion High School, Foxworth, Mississippi
- Marion Center Area High School, Marion Center, Pennsylvania
- Marion L. Steele High School, Amherst, Ohio
- Marion-Franklin High School, Columbus, Ohio
- Litchville-Marion High School, Marion, North Dakota
