= Marion County High School =

Marion County High School may refer to the following American schools:

- Marion County High School (Alabama), Guin, Alabama
- Marion County High School (Kentucky), Lebanon, Kentucky
- Marion County High School (Missouri), Philadelphia, Missouri
- Marion County High School (Tennessee), Jasper, Tennessee

== See also ==
- Marion High School (disambiguation)
