= Marion Bay =

Marion Bay may refer to:

- Marion Bay, South Australia, a locality
- Marion Bay, Tasmania
  - Marion Bay Important Bird Area

== See also ==
- Marion (disambiguation)
