= Charles Hoag =

American school administrator, Minnesota

- Born: June 29, 1808; Sandwich, New Hampshire
- Died: 1888 (aged 79–80); Diamond Lake Farm
- Education: Wolfboro Academy; Moses Brown School

Charles Hoag (June 29, 1808 – 1888) was a New England classical scholar, the first schoolmaster of the city of Minneapolis, and second Treasurer of Hennepin County. He is also known to have played a part in the naming of Minneapolis. After starting farming, he served as President of the Agricultural and Horticultural Societies of Minnesota.

== Early life, education and career ==
Hoag was born in Sandwich, New Hampshire, and was educated in the public schools of the time. He also attended Wolfboro Academy and Moses Brown School at Providence, Rhode Island. By the time he was 16, Hoag had started work as a teacher, which he would continue to practice for the next 27 years.

He also served as the principal of a Philadelphia grammar school for 13 years. He married and had a family, including two daughters.

== Move to Minnesota ==
Attracted by the promise of land, Hoag moved to Minnesota in 1852, where he taught in Saint Anthony for two terms. Upon his arrival in the state, he claimed 160 acres (0.65 km^{2}) of land at the future site of Minneapolis. As time went by, he became more involved in public affairs, and was appointed as the second treasurer of Hennepin County. He joined the fraternal society of the Odd Fellows, serving one term as Grand Master of the Minnesota Grand Lodge.

Based on his long experience in education, Hoag served as Hennepin County Superintendent of Schools from 1870 to 1874.

Hoag also served as President of the Agricultural and Horticultural Societies of Minnesota. He had purchased a farm in 1857, which he called Diamond Lake Farm.

Charles Hoag is said to have played a central role in the naming of the city of Minneapolis. In 1852 the Hennepin County commissioners selected Albion as the name for the city. Not liking it, Hoag, along with George Bowman, editor of the St. Anthony Express, decided to come up with an alternative name. That night, Hoag was thinking about Indianapolis. Having been trying to form a word from Indian suffixes, he decided to combine the Greek "polis", meaning city, with part of Minnehaha. This was and is mistakenly thought to be Dakota for "laughing water," but it translates more accurately as "curling water" or "waterfall" (see Minnehaha Falls).

The next morning Hoag published an article with Bowman's help proposing the name Minnehapolis, explaining that the “h” was silent. Writing in the Express, he said: "I am aware that other names have been proposed such as Lowell, Brooklyn and Addiesville, but until some one [sic] is decided upon, we intend to call ourselves Minnehapolis." In a town meeting in December 1852 John Stevens accepted the name without the "h".

Charles Hoag moved to Diamond Lake Farm and lived there until his death in 1888.

Lake Addie and Lake Marion, both in McLeod County, Minnesota were named for Hoag's daughters.
