= Levi B. Frost House =

Historic house in Connecticut, United States

- Levi B Frost House/Asa Barns’ Tavern
- U.S. National Register of Historic Places
- U.S. Historic district – Contributing property
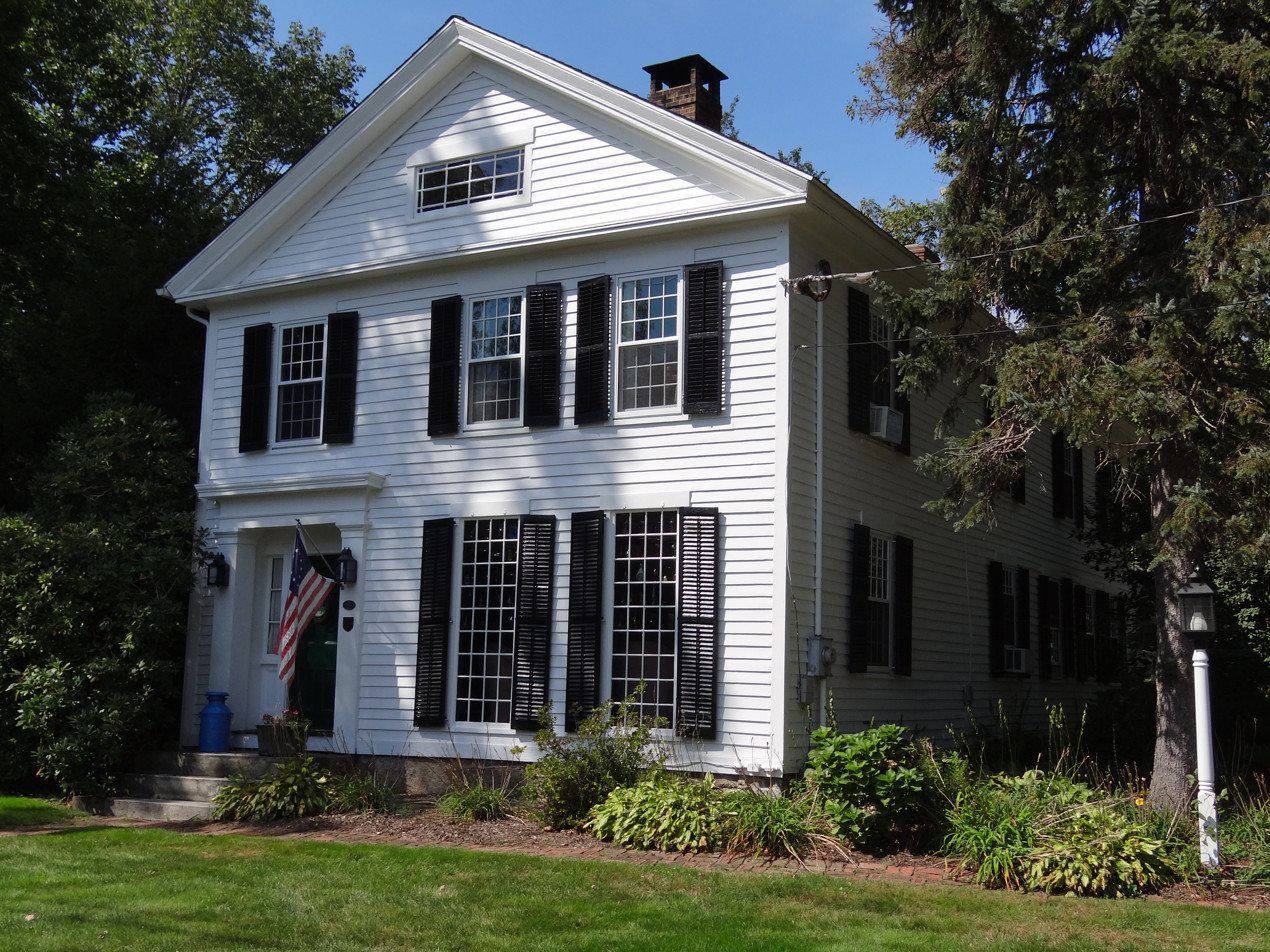

- Location within Connecticut Location within the United States
- Location: 1089 Marion Avenue, Southington, Connecticut
- Coordinates: 41°34′5″N 72°55′29″W
- Area: 1.8 acres (0.73 ha)
- Built: 1765/1836
- Architectural style: Colonial/Greek Revival
- Part of: Marion Historic District (ID88001423)
- NRHP reference No.: 87002037

Significant dates
- Added to NRHP: November 20, 1987
- Designated CP: December 21, 1988

The Levi B Frost House, also known as the Asa Barns’ Tavern, is a historic building in the Marion village of Southington, Connecticut. The home represents over two centuries of Southington history. It appears twice on the National Register of Historic Places, as an individual structure and as a part of the Marion Historic District. It is significant both architecturally and historically for its connection to United States and New England history.

Asa Barns established a tavern here around 1765, when Marion Avenue was part of a north–south road connecting Bristol and New Haven. French general Jean-Baptiste Donatien de Vimeur, comte de Rochambeau established a campsite for the French army on June 26, 1781 during the American Revolutionary War. Barns entertained Rocchambeau and his officers in his tavern for the four nights of the encampment. He gave a ball at the tavern in their honor, at which a large number of the young women of the vicinity were present and esteemed it an honor to have a cotillon with the polite foreigners. Rochambeau and his officers visited Barns' Tavern again on the return march on October 27, 1782.

Barns lived in the house until his death in 1819, after which his son leased the building to Micah Rugg and Levi B. Frost, two pioneers in the manufacture of carriage bolts that started in Marion in the 1840s. The Frost-Rugg partnership did not last long, however, and the men parted ways. Frost was a blacksmith who specialized in shoeing oxen and making hand-forged bolts and other products, and he bought the house from Barns in 1820. The house served as his blacksmith shop, his home, and his country store.

The house burned in 1836, and the extent of damage is unknown, although a record indicates the front part of the building burned. Frost rebuilt it in 1836 in the newer Greek Revival style that was popular in the early part of the 19th century. He incorporated a full pedimented gable, three-bay facade, recessed front doorway that is flanked by plain pilasters that support an entablature with projecting cyma cornice characteristic of Greek Revival buildings. What is uncharacteristic of the Greek Revival style is the building's length of 50 feet, which may be the result of the original 18th-century structure. Investigators believe that the large rear room appears older than the rest of the house and, according to local lore, may be the pre-1836 taproom of the former tavern. The supporting beams under the rear portion of the house are tree trunks with bark intact, indicating that this part of the building is older.

The house has remained a private residence and came under the protection of the National Park Service in 1987 when listed to the National Register of Historic Places for its architectural and historical significance. It is also part of the Marion Historic District.

== See also ==
- Washington–Rochambeau Revolutionary Route
- List of historic sites preserved along Rochambeau's route
- National Register of Historic Places listings in Southington, Connecticut
