= Marion Township, Arkansas =

Marion Township, Arkansas may refer to:

- Marion Township, Bradley County, Arkansas
- Marion Township, Drew County, Arkansas
- Marion Township, Lawrence County, Arkansas
- Marion Township, Ouachita County, Arkansas
- Marion Township, Phillips County, Arkansas
- Marion Township, Sebastian County, Arkansas
- Marion Township, White County, Arkansas

== See also ==
- List of townships in Arkansas
- Marion Township (disambiguation)
