= Marijonas =

- Gender: Male
- Language: Lithuanian
- Name day: 30 April 2 July

Origin
- Region of origin: Lithuania

Other names
- Related names: Marion

Marijonas is a Lithuanian masculine given name. Individuals with the name Marijonas include:

- Marijonas Mikutavičius (born 1971), television presenter, singer, songwriter, and journalist
- Marijonas Petravičius (born 1979), basketball player
