= Marion, Wetzel County, West Virginia =

Marion
- Unincorporated community
- Location within the state of West Virginia Marion (the United States)
- Coordinates: 39°40′32″N 80°46′17″W
- Country: United States
- State: West Virginia
- County: Wetzel
- Elevation: 889 ft (271 m)
- Time zone: UTC-5 (Eastern (EST))
  - Summer (DST): UTC-4 (EDT)
- GNIS ID: 1555048

Marion is an unincorporated community in Wetzel County, West Virginia, United States.
