= Maryon (surname) =

Maryon is a surname. Notable people with the surname include:

- Edith Maryon (1872–1924), English sculptor
- Edward D. Maryon (1931–2005), American painter and educator
- Herbert Maryon (1874–1965), English sculptor, goldsmith, and authority on ancient metalwork

== See also ==
- Maryon (given name)
- Maryon-Wilson baronets
