= Marion Township =

Marion Township may refer to:

== Arkansas ==
- Marion Township, Bradley County, Arkansas
- Marion Township, Drew County, Arkansas
- Marion Township, Lawrence County, Arkansas
- Marion Township, Ouachita County, Arkansas
- Marion Township, Phillips County, Arkansas
- Marion Township, Sebastian County, Arkansas
- Marion Township, White County, Arkansas

== Illinois ==
- Marion Township, Lee County, Illinois
- Marion Township, Ogle County, Illinois

== Indiana ==
- Marion Township, Allen County, Indiana
- Marion Township, Boone County, Indiana
- Marion Township, Decatur County, Indiana
- Marion Township, Dubois County, Indiana
- Marion Township, Hendricks County, Indiana
- Marion Township, Jasper County, Indiana
- Marion Township, Jennings County, Indiana
- Marion Township, Lawrence County, Indiana
- Marion Township, Owen County, Indiana
- Marion Township, Pike County, Indiana
- Marion Township, Putnam County, Indiana
- Marion Township, Shelby County, Indiana

== Iowa ==
- Marion Township, Clayton County, Iowa
- Marion Township, Davis County, Iowa
- Marion Township, Franklin County, Iowa
- Marion Township, Hamilton County, Iowa
- Marion Township, Henry County, Iowa
- Marion Township, Lee County, Iowa
- Marion Township, Linn County, Iowa
- Marion Township, Marshall County, Iowa
- Marion Township, Plymouth County, Iowa
- Marion Township, Washington County, Iowa

== Kansas ==
- Marion Township, Bourbon County, Kansas
- Marion Township, Doniphan County, Kansas
- Marion Township, Douglas County, Kansas
- Marion Township, Lincoln County, Kansas
- Marion Township, Nemaha County, Kansas

== Michigan ==
- Marion Township, Charlevoix County, Michigan
- Marion Township, Livingston County, Michigan
- Marion Township, Osceola County, Michigan
- Marion Township, Saginaw County, Michigan
- Marion Township, Sanilac County, Michigan

== Minnesota ==
- Marion Township, Olmsted County, Minnesota

== Missouri ==
- Marion Township, Buchanan County, Missouri
- Marion Township, Cole County, Missouri
- Marion Township, Dade County, Missouri
- Marion Township, Daviess County, Missouri
- Marion Township, Grundy County, Missouri
- Marion Township, Jasper County, Missouri
- Marion Township, Harrison County, Missouri
- Marion Township, Mercer County, Missouri
- Marion Township, Monroe County, Missouri
- Marion Township, Newton County, Missouri
- Marion Township, St. Francois County, Missouri

== Nebraska ==
- Marion Township, Franklin County, Nebraska

== New Jersey ==
- Marion Township, New Jersey

== North Carolina ==
- Marion Township, McDowell County, North Carolina

== North Dakota ==
- Marion Township, Bowman County, North Dakota

== Ohio ==
- Marion Township, Allen County, Ohio
- Marion Township, Clinton County, Ohio
- Marion Township, Fayette County, Ohio
- Marion Township, Franklin County, Ohio, defunct
- Marion Township, Hancock County, Ohio
- Marion Township, Hardin County, Ohio
- Marion Township, Henry County, Ohio
- Marion Township, Hocking County, Ohio
- Marion Township, Marion County, Ohio
- Marion Township, Mercer County, Ohio
- Marion Township, Morgan County, Ohio
- Marion Township, Noble County, Ohio
- Marion Township, Pike County, Ohio

== Pennsylvania ==
- Marion Township, Beaver County, Pennsylvania
- Marion Township, Berks County, Pennsylvania
- Marion Township, Butler County, Pennsylvania
- Marion Township, Centre County, Pennsylvania

== South Dakota ==
- Marion Township, Turner County, South Dakota
