= Lake Marion (McLeod County, Minnesota) =

Lake in the state of Minnesota, United States

- Location within Minnesota
- Location: McLeod County, Minnesota
- Coordinates: 44°47′0″N 94°23′5″W
- Type: lake

Lake Marion is a lake in McLeod County, in the U.S. state of Minnesota.

Lake Marion was named for Marion Hoag, the daughter of settler Charles Hoag.

== See also ==
- List of lakes in Minnesota
