= Maryon Vadie =

American dancer

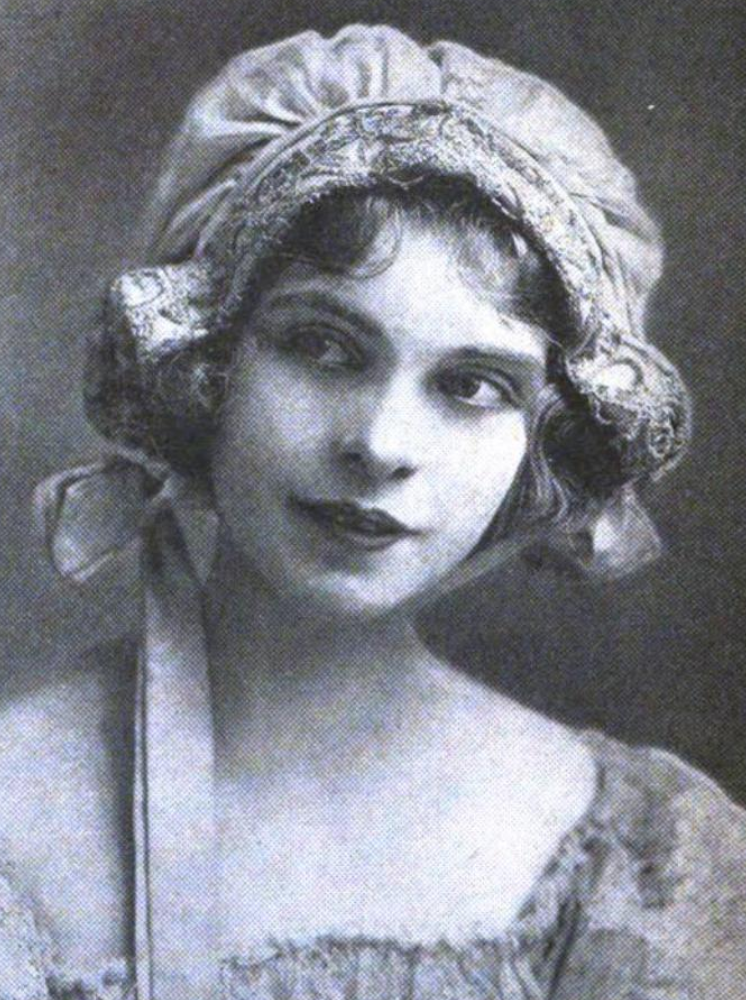
- Maryon Vadie, from a 1920 publication
- Born: Maryon Elizabeth Dunbar; December 25, 1895; Springfield, Massachusetts, U.S.
- Died: February 1975 (age 79); Tucson, Arizona, U.S.
- Occupations: Dancer, vaudeville performer
- Spouse(s): Ota Gygi, Harry Green

Maryon Vadie (December 25, 1895 – February 1975), born Maryon Elizabeth Dunbar, was an American dancer and vaudeville performer in the 1910s and 1920s. She was often accompanied by her first husband, violinist Ota Gygi.

== Early life and education ==
Vadie was born in Springfield, Massachusetts, the daughter of Loren Franklin Dunbar and Grace Adella Newton Dunbar. She was raised in Los Angeles, where she attended Westlake School. She trained as a dancer with Katherine West Nathan in Pasadena, and with dancer and choreographer Luigi Albertieri in New York. In 1914, she was featured dancer in a large cast of children in spring pageant in Los Angeles.

== Career ==
Maryon Vadie

Vadie toured the United States and Canada in the 1910s, sometimes billed as "America's Peerless Danseuse". Her photograph was on the cover of Variety in 1916. She appeared in Cinderella on Broadway in 1920. She headlined vaudeville programs, dancing to her husband's violin accompaniment. Vanity Fair called her "the American Genée" in 1922. In 1924 she and Gygi planned to open a summer dancing school in New Jersey. She promoted the Maryon Vadie Dancers, a troop of six young women she considered protegees. Vadie and Gygi assembled a revue of twenty performers for a "high-class stage entertainment" in 1928.

== Personal life ==
In 1917, Vadie married Austrian violinist Ludwig Feinland, known professionally as Ota Gygi. Her second husband was Harry Green; they wed in 1936, and moved to Arizona in 1950. She died in 1975, at the age of 79, in Tucson, Arizona.
