= Thoré-la-Rochette =

- Commune
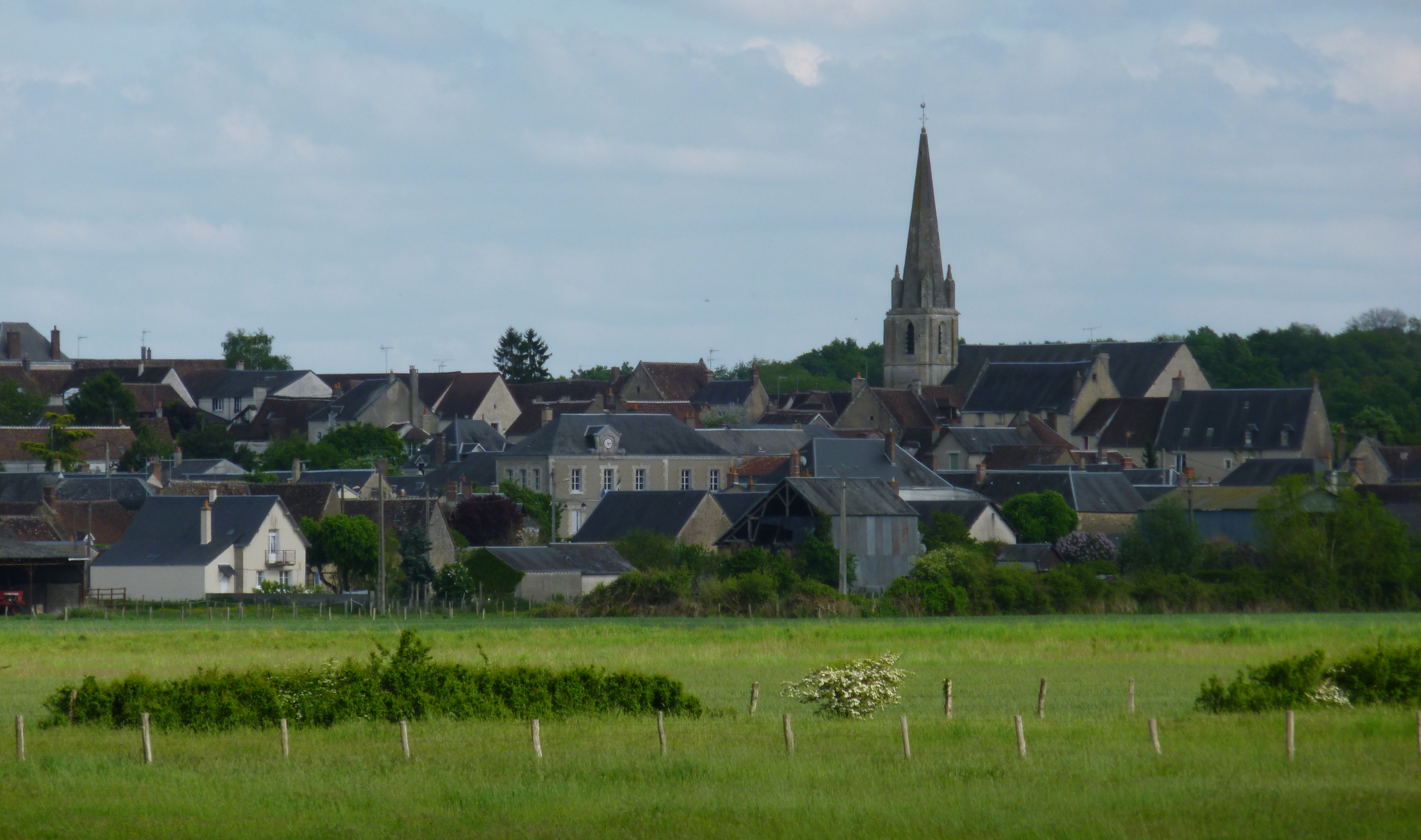

- Coat of arms
- Location of Thoré-la-Rochette
- Location within France Location within Centre-Val de Loire
- Coordinates: 47°47′22″N 0°57′56″E
- Country: France
- Region: Centre-Val de Loire
- Department: Loir-et-Cher
- Arrondissement: Vendôme
- Canton: Montoire-sur-le-Loir
- Intercommunality: CA Territoires Vendômois

Government
  - Mayor (2020–2026): Thierry Benoist
- Area^{1}: 10.78 km^{2} (4.16 sq mi)
- Elevation: 76 m (249 ft)
- Highest elevation: 137 m (449 ft)
- Lowest elevation: 69 m (226 ft)
- Population (2023): 810
  - Density: 75/km^{2} (190/sq mi)
- Time zone: UTC+01:00 (CET)
  - Summer (DST): UTC+02:00 (CEST)
- INSEE/Postal code: 41259 /41100
- ^{1} French Land Register data, which excludes lakes, ponds, glaciers > 1 km^{2} (0.386 sq mi or 247 acres) and river estuaries.

Thoré-la-Rochette (French pronunciation: [tɔʁe la ʁɔʃɛt]) is a commune of the Loir-et-Cher department in central France.

== Population ==
Historical population
Year	Pop.	±% p.a.
1968	683	—
1975	797	+2.23%
1982	823	+0.46%
1990	863	+0.59%
1999	883	+0.25%
2007	927	+0.61%
2012	870	−1.26%
2017	885	+0.34%
2023	810	−1.47%
Source: INSEE

== See also ==
- Communes of the Loir-et-Cher department
