= Marion railway station =

Railway station in Adelaide, South Australia

Marion
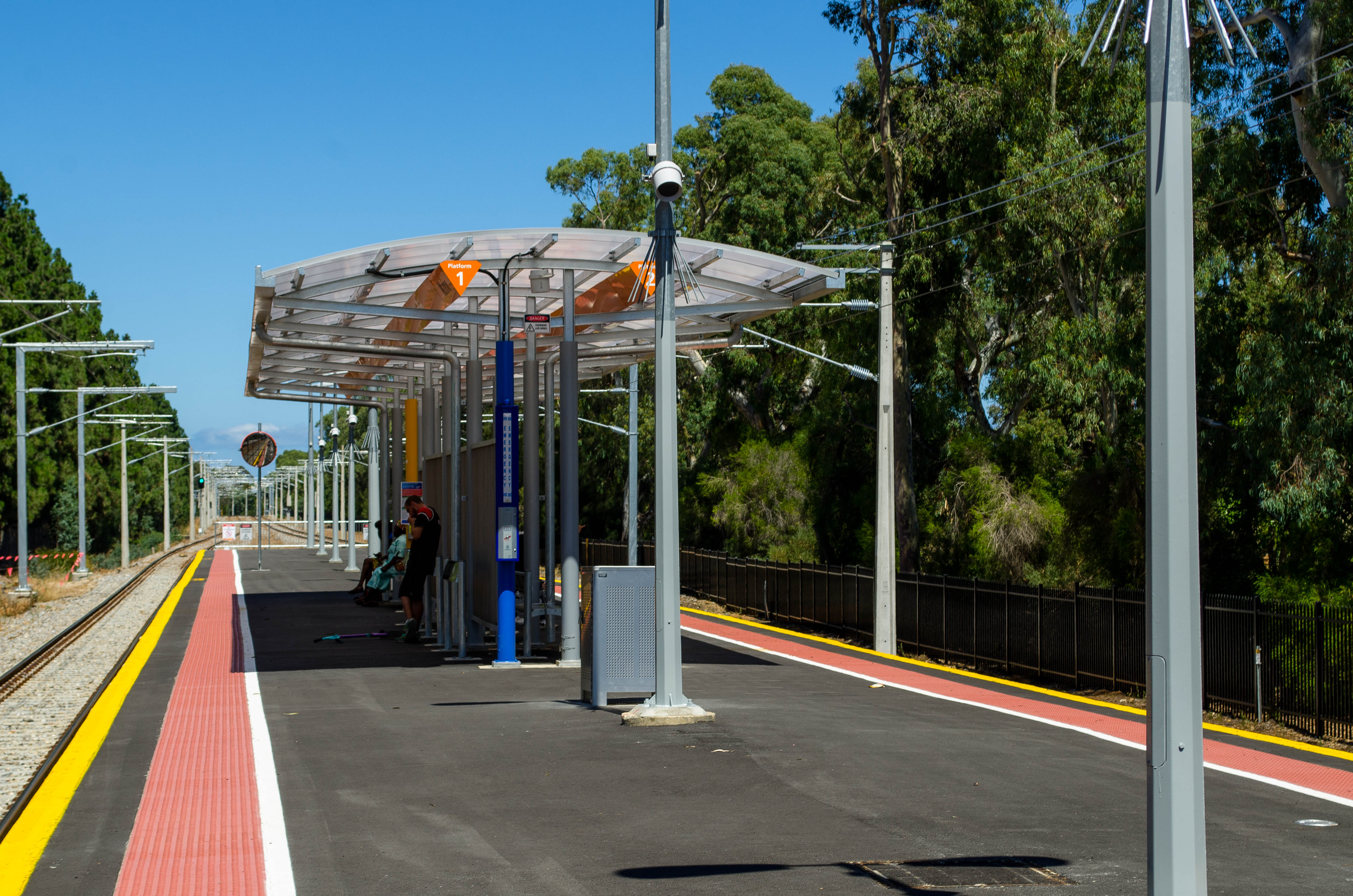
- North-east bound view from Platform 1, February 2014

General information
- Location: Farne Terrace, Marion
- Coordinates: 34°59′56″S 138°33′10″E
- Owner: Department for Infrastructure & Transport
- Operator: Adelaide Metro
- Line: Seaford
- Distance: 11.4 km from Adelaide
- Platforms: 2
- Tracks: 2

Construction
- Structure type: Ground
- Parking: Yes
- Cycle facilities: Yes
- Accessible: Yes

History
- Opened: 26 May 1954
- Rebuilt: 30 November 2013

Services
Preceding station	Adelaide Metro	Following station
Ascot Park towards Adelaide	Seaford line	Oaklands towards Seaford
Location

Marion railway station is located on the Seaford line. Situated in the south-western Adelaide suburb of Marion, it is 11.4 kilometres from Adelaide station.

== History ==
Until the early 1950s, the Ascot Park and Oaklands stations serviced Marion with a single rail track. In 1953, the line was duplicated as far as Oaklands, and as part of that work a new station was constructed at Marion. It was opened on 26 May 1954. Marion received a station building similar to that still remaining at Woodlands Park station.

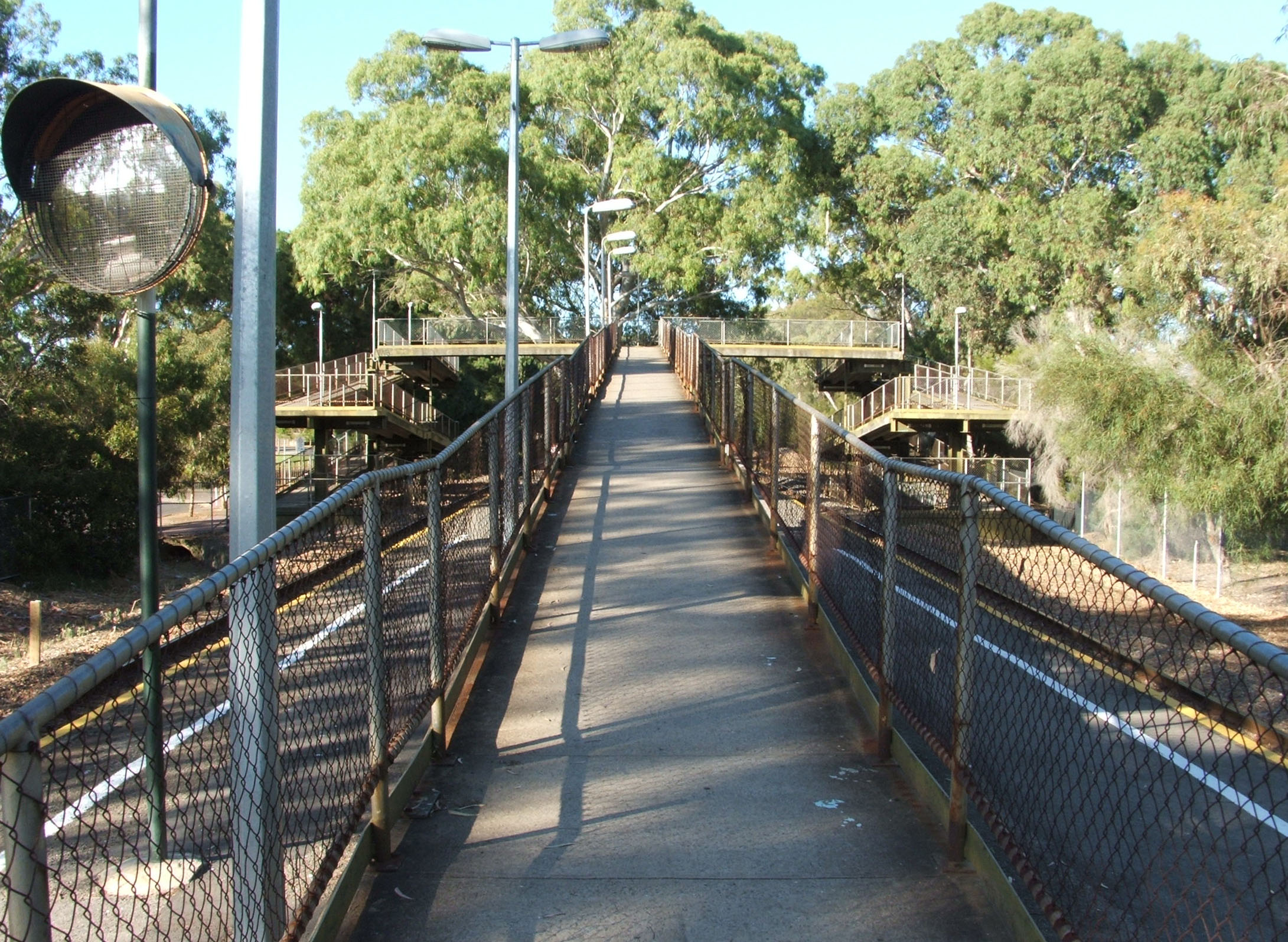
Footbridge over the station, since removed.

In the 1960s, concerns were raised regarding the safety of pedestrians crossing at the southern end of the station, where no pedestrian barriers had been installed. This lack was seen as contributing to a fatality in 1967. In response, a pedestrian footbridge was constructed in 1970, and the then existing pedestrian maze barrier-equipped crossing at the northern end was removed. This ensured that the footbridge provided the sole personal access to both the platform and to the other side of the line. At the northern end, a more convenient low-level track crossing and station access was re-installed in the 1990s.

== Rebuild ==
As part of the electrification of the line, Marion station was rebuilt in 2013, with a new waiting shelter installed, an underpass built and the bridge demolished. The underpass was built at the northern end to replace the overpass and pedestrian crossing. The project was completed on 30 November 2013. Local residents had expressed their preference that the overpass be replaced instead, based largely on undesirable behaviour that occurs in an underpass because of the lack of visibility. Although it was meant to address flooding issues that had plagued the area, the underpass flooded twice in 2014.

=== Platform length ===
In 2017, it was addressed that the station cannot facilitate trains longer than five cars in length. This is a problem on AFL game days when trains of six carriages must overhang the platform. DPTI have not acted further on the issue and the platform is unlikely to be extended in the near future however it would be preferable for the better function of this station. As of the upgrades to the station in 2014, the platform was slightly shortened due to the new underpass being constructed at the North end of the station where a ground level pedestrian crossing formerly sat.

== Services by platform ==
Platform	Destination/s
1	Seaford
2	Adelaide

== See also ==
- Railways in Adelaide
- Rail transport in South Australia
