= Marion Township, Osceola County, Michigan =

Marion Township, Michigan
- Civil township
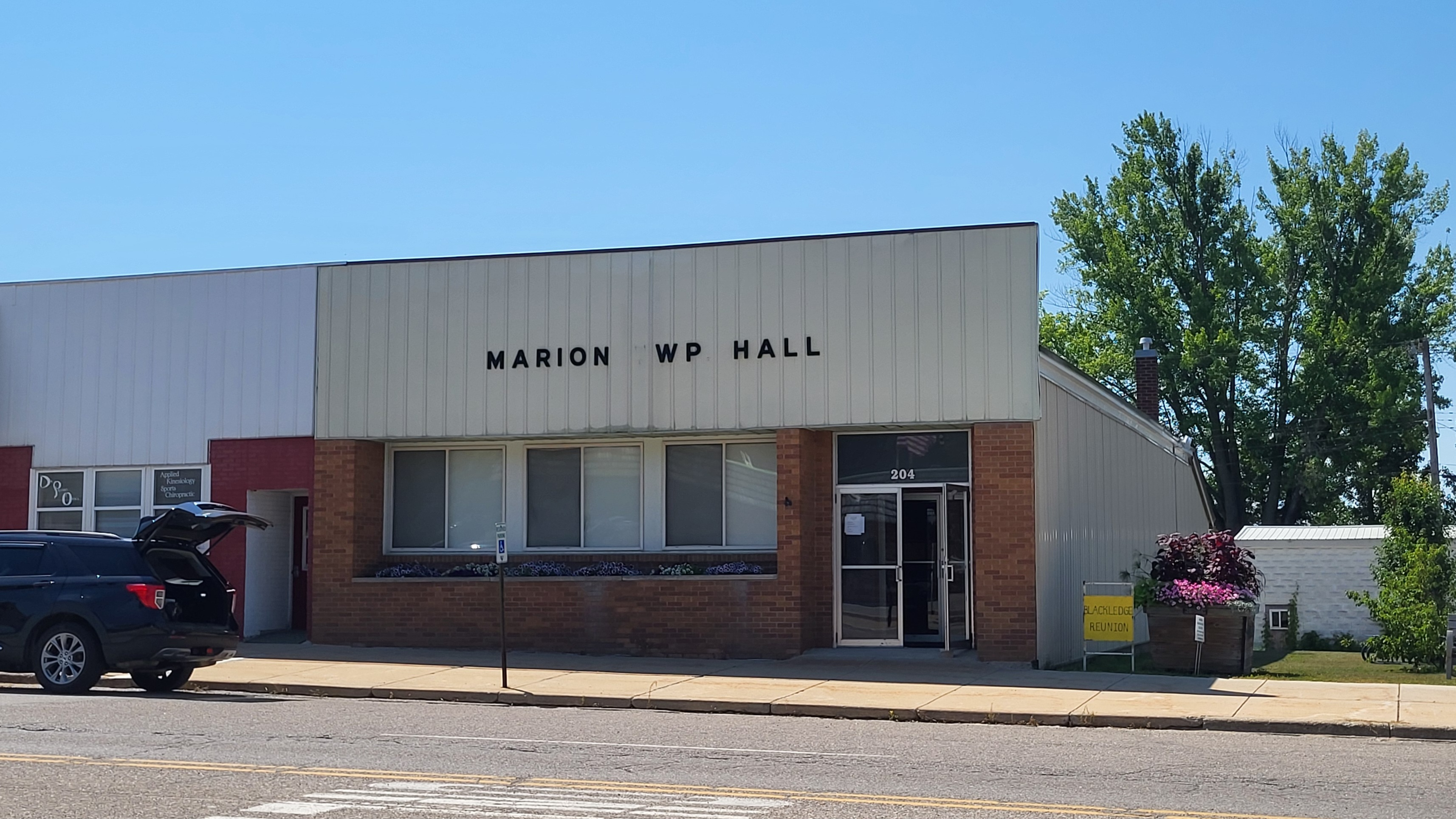
- Marion Township Hall in Marion

- Location within Osceola County (red) and the administered village of Marion (pink)

- Location within the state of Michigan Location within the United States
- Coordinates: 44°06′32″N 85°08′52″W
- Country: United States
- State: Michigan
- County: Osceola
- Established: 1877

Government
  - Supervisor: Doug Bontekoe
  - Clerk: Connie Zuiderveen

Area
  - Total: 37.05 sq mi (95.96 km^{2})
  - Land: 37.01 sq mi (95.86 km^{2})
  - Water: 0.039 sq mi (0.10 km^{2})
- Elevation: 1,122 ft (342 m)

Population (2020)
  - Total: 1,565
  - Density: 42.3/sq mi (16.3/km^{2})
- Time zone: UTC-5 (Eastern (EST))
  - Summer (DST): UTC-4 (EDT)
- ZIP codes(s): 49665 (Marion)
- Area code: 231
- FIPS code: 26-51680
- GNIS feature ID: 1626690
- Website: Official website

Marion Township is a civil township of Osceola County in the U.S. state of Michigan. The population was 1,565 at the 2020 census. The Village of Marion is located within the township.

== Communities ==
- Clark's Mill was formed around a lumber mill starting in 1880.
- Marion is a village in the township.

== Geography ==
According to the United States Census Bureau, the township has a total area of 37.1 square miles (96.0 km^{2}), of which 37.0 square miles (95.9 km^{2}) is land and 0.04 square mile (0.1 km^{2}) (0.11%) is water.

== Demographics ==
As of the census of 2000, there were 1,580 people, 638 households, and 435 families residing in the township. The population density was 42.7 inhabitants per square mile (16.5/km^{2}). There were 732 housing units at an average density of 19.8 per square mile (7.6/km^{2}). The racial makeup of the township was 98.23% White, 0.06% African American, 0.57% Native American, 0.13% Asian, 0.13% from other races, and 0.89% from two or more races. Hispanic or Latino of any race were 0.95% of the population.

There were 638 households, out of which 34.0% had children under the age of 18 living with them, 52.4% were married couples living together, 10.3% had a female householder with no husband present, and 31.8% were non-families. 27.0% of all households were made up of individuals, and 11.8% had someone living alone who was 65 years of age or older. The average household size was 2.46 and the average family size was 2.96.

In the township the population was spread out, with 27.0% under the age of 18, 8.5% from 18 to 24, 27.5% from 25 to 44, 22.5% from 45 to 64, and 14.4% who were 65 years of age or older. The median age was 36 years. For every 100 females, there were 100.5 males. For every 100 females age 18 and over, there were 92.2 males.

The median income for a household in the township was $31,615, and the median income for a family was $38,500. Males had a median income of $27,821 versus $19,412 for females. The per capita income for the township was $16,218. About 13.3% of families and 17.4% of the population were below the poverty line, including 22.8% of those under age 18 and 15.1% of those age 65 or over.
