= Marion Street Area Historic District =

Historic district in South Carolina, United States

- U.S. National Register of Historic Places
- U.S. Historic district
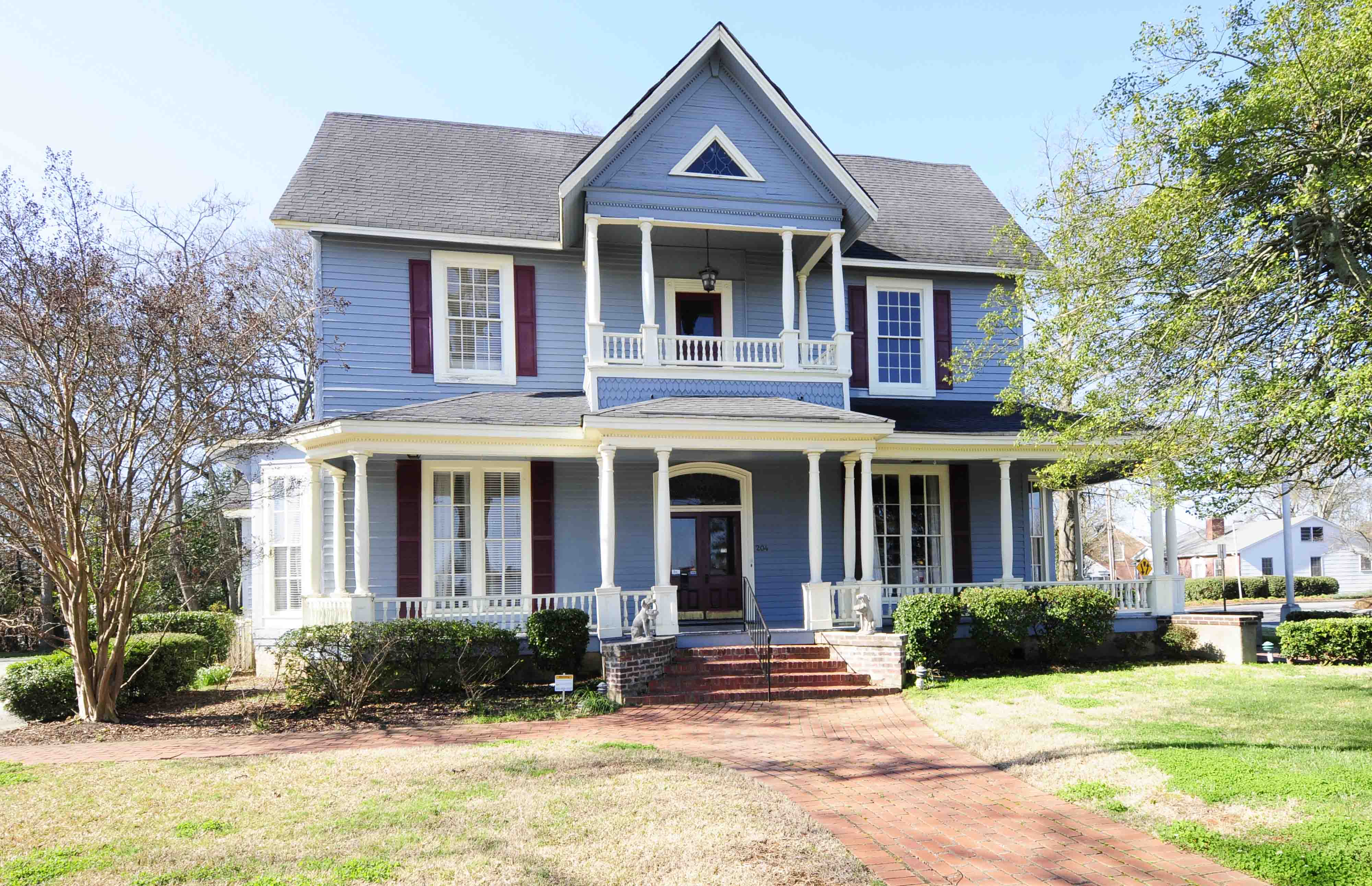
- Rawlinson House, Marion Street Area Historic District, March 2012

- Location within South Carolina Location within the United States
- Location: Roughly, Marion St. from Hampton St. to Center St. and Center from State St. to Marion, Rock Hill, South Carolina
- Coordinates: 34°55′13″N 81°1′43″W
- Area: 10 acres (4.0 ha)
- Architectural style: Classical Revival, Bungalow/craftsman, Late Victorian
- MPS: Rock Hill MPS
- NRHP reference No.: 92000654
- Added to NRHP: June 10, 1992

Marion Street Area Historic District is a national historic district in Rock Hill, South Carolina. It encompasses 28 contributing buildings and 1 contributing site in a middle-class residential section of Rock Hill. The bulk of the district developed between 1906 and 1925. Architectural styles represented include Victorian, Classical Revival, Colonial Revival, and Bungalow. Notable buildings include the Rawlinson House (c. 1874–1875), McCall-Jones-Byrant House (c. 1900), Davis House, and W. B. Jenkins House (c. 1920).

It was listed on the National Register of Historic Places in 1992.
