= Marion, Shelby County, Indiana =

- Unincorporated community and CDP
- Location within Indiana Location within the United States
- Coordinates: 39°35′18″N 85°45′31″W
- Country: United States
- State: Indiana
- County: Shelby
- Township: Marion
- Founder: James Wilson; John Sleeth
- Named for: General Francis Marion
- Elevation: 784 ft (239 m)
- Time zone: UTC-5 (Eastern (EST))
  - Summer (DST): UTC-4 (EDT)
- ZIP code: 46176
- GNIS feature ID: 2830534

Marion is an unincorporated community in Marion Township, Shelby County, in the U.S. state of Indiana.

== History ==
James Wilson was the first settler in the future Shelby County, raising a cabin there in 1819. In 1820 the New Purchase areas were formally surrendered to the government, and the land was made available for purchase. In 1820 Wilson and a few other settlers traveled to the Government Land Office at Brookville to make good their existing settlement claims. Returning from Brookville, Wilson brought a surveyor. In partnership with John Sleeth, a townsite with streets, alleys and a public square was laid out and platted. This was the first such effort in the future county, which was authorized by the state legislature on 31 December 1821. The community was named for Francis Marion, an army officer during the American Revolutionary War, A post office opened at Marion in 1823. The post office was renamed Noah Post Office in September 1836, and was discontinued in 1902.

Marion once contained a high school which closed in about 1908.

== Demographics ==
The United States Census Bureau defined Marion as a census designated place in the 2022 American Community Survey.
