= Marion Junior-Senior High School =

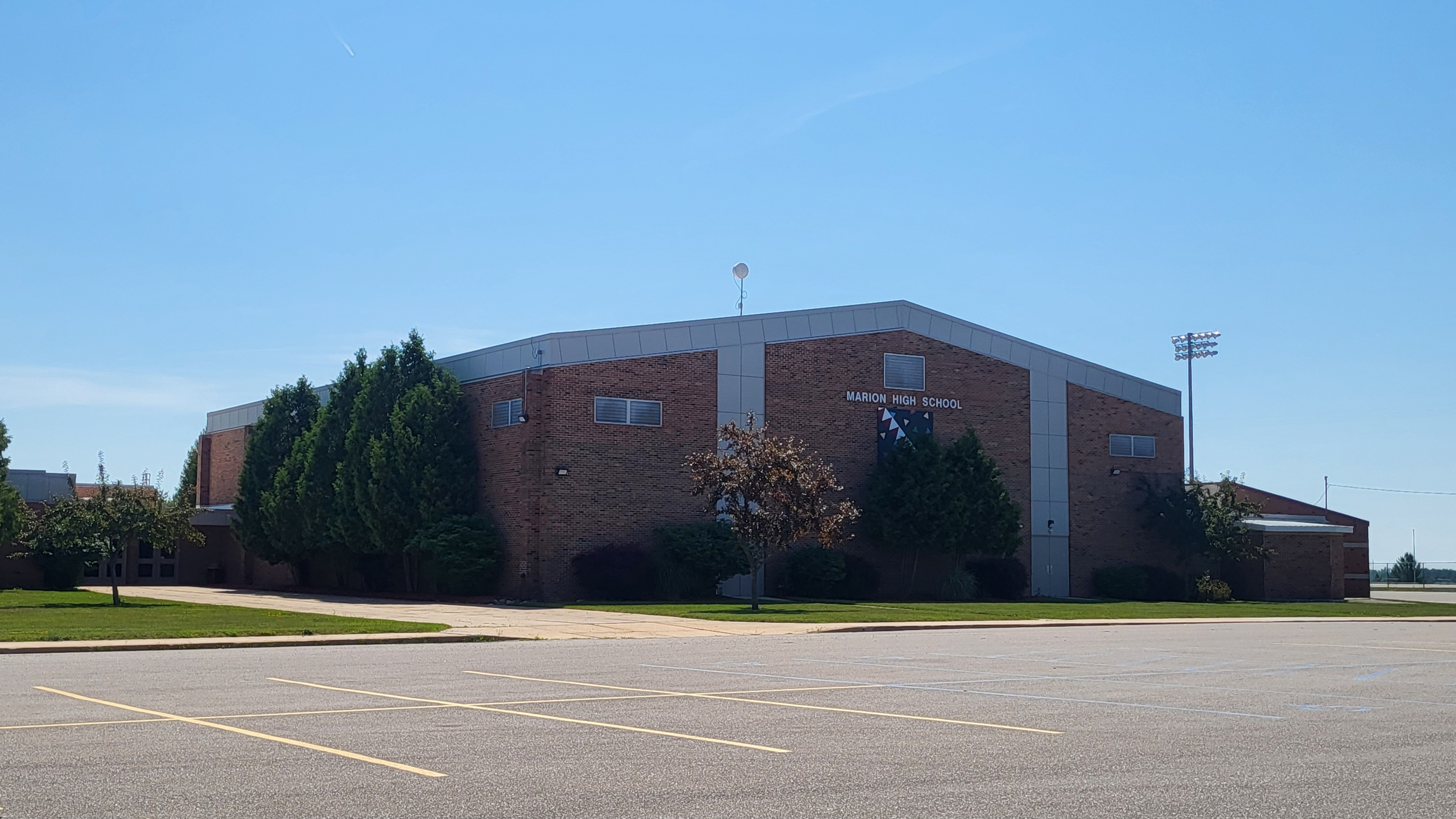
- Marion High School

Location
- 2213 20 Mile Road; Marion, Michigan 49665; United States
- 44°06′06″N 85°07′54″W

Information
- Type: Public
- School district: Marion Public Schools; Wexford-Missaukee Intermediate School District
- Superintendent: vacant
- Principal: Danyel Prielipp
- Teaching staff: 12.69 (on a FTE basis)
- Grades: 6-12
- Enrollment: 216 (2023–2024)
- Student to teacher ratio: 17.02
- Colors: Maroon; White
- Athletics conference: West Michigan D League
- Mascot: Eagles
- Website: www.marion.k12.mi.us/page/jr-sr-high-school

Marion Junior-Senior High School is a public school located outside Marion, Michigan, in Osceola County. It serves grades 7–12 in the Marion Public Schools.

Students who meet the prerequisites may attend classes at Mid-Michigan Community College in Harrison or Baker College in Cadillac for credit in place of usual high school courses. Students may also attend the Wexford-Missaukee Area Career Technical Center, administered by the Wexford-Missaukee Intermediate School District.

Marion Junior-Senior High School offers a variety of classes and activities such as wood-working, band, choir, robotics, eSports, and volunteering in the community with their MPACT, SLS (Students leading students) and National Honor Society teams.

Marion recognizes students for many outstanding achievements

== Demographics ==
The demographic breakdown of the 261 students enrolled in 2018-19 was:

- Male - 47.1%
- Female - 52.9%
- Native American - 0.4%
- Black - 1.9%
- Hispanic - 1.1%
- White - 95.4%
- Multiracial - 1.1%

In addition, 62.5% of students were eligible for free or reduced lunch.

== Athletics ==
The Marion Eagles are members of the West Michigan D League. The school colors are maroon and white. MHSAA sanctioned sports offered are:

- Baseball (boys)
- Basketball (boys and girls)
- Competitive cheer (girls)
- Cross country (boys and girls)
- Football (8-player) (boys)
- Soccer (girls)
- Softball (girls)
- Track and field (boys and girls)
- Volleyball (girls)
