= Marion Township, Pennsylvania =

Marion Township is the name of some places in the U.S. state of Pennsylvania:

- Marion Township, Beaver County, Pennsylvania
- Marion Township, Berks County, Pennsylvania
- Marion Township, Butler County, Pennsylvania
- Marion Township, Centre County, Pennsylvania
