= Marion, Missouri =

Unincorporated community in Missouri, U.S.

Coordinates: 38°41′27″N 92°21′59″W

Marion is an unincorporated community in Cole County, Missouri, United States. Marion is in the northwest corner of the county, in historic Marion Township, and very near the post-1845 county boundary line with Moniteau County. The community is located on Missouri Route 179 and overlooks the Missouri River to the east.

(Note: This community should not be confused, as it has sometimes been, with Marion County, Missouri, about 90 miles to its NNE).

== History ==
Marion was laid out in 1820, and was the Cole County government seat until 1829, prior to its move to Jefferson City (and during which time Cole county included what became the eastern half of a new Moniteau County in 1845). The community was named for Francis Marion, an officer in the Revolutionary War. A post office was established at Marion in 1823, and remained in operation until 1953.
