= Marion (surname) =

Marion is a surname. Notable people with the surname include:

- Anne Windfohr Marion (1938–2020), American rancher and business executive
- Brock Marion (born 1970), American retired National Football League player
- Don Marion Davis (1917–2020), American child actor
- Francis Marion (c. 1732 – 1795), army officer during the American Revolutionary War, known as the Swamp Fox
- Jean-Luc Marion (born 1946), French historian of philosophy, phenomenologist and Roman Catholic theologian
- Jerry Marion (born 1944), American National Football League player
- John L. Marion (1933–2026), American auctioneer, philanthropist and Chairman of Sotheby's from 1975 to 1994
- J. Paul Marion (1927–2023), Canadian politician
- Marty Marion (1917–2011), American Major League Baseball player and manager
- Paul Marion (actor) (1915–2011), American actor
- Paul Marion (politician) (1899–1954), French journalist and Vichy French Minister of Information
- Pierre Marion (1921–2010), French secret service chief
- Shawn Marion (born 1978), American former National Basketball Association player
- William Jackson Marion (1849–1887) American man wrongfully executed for murder
