= Marion Township, Cole County, Missouri =

Inactive township in the US state of Missouri

Coordinates: 38.6336°N 92.3714°W

Marion Township is an inactive township in Cole County, in the U.S. state of Missouri.

Marion Township most likely took its name from Marion, Missouri.
