= Marion Lake (Montana) =

- Location within Montana
- Location: Flathead County, Montana
- Coordinates: 48.2658°N 113.6751°W
- Type: lake

Marion Lake is a lake in the U.S. state of Montana.

Marion Lake is named after the daughter of Thomas Shields (who himself is the namesake to Shields Creek).

== See also ==
- List of lakes in Flathead County, Montana (M-Z)
