= Marion Township, Shelby County, Indiana =

Marion Township
- Township
- Coordinates: 39°35′29″N 85°45′18″W
- Country: United States
- State: Indiana
- County: Shelby

Government
  - Type: Indiana township

Area
  - Total: 24.95 sq mi (64.6 km^{2})
  - Land: 24.82 sq mi (64.3 km^{2})
  - Water: 0.12 sq mi (0.31 km^{2})
- Elevation: 791 ft (241 m)

Population (2020)
  - Total: 1,935
  - Density: 77.5/sq mi (29.9/km^{2})
- FIPS code: 18-47052
- GNIS feature ID: 453613

Marion Township is one of fourteen townships in Shelby County, Indiana. As of the 2010 census, its population was 1,923 and it contained 867 housing units.

Marion Township was named for Francis Marion, an army officer during the American Revolutionary War, known as the Swamp Fox.

== Geography ==
According to the 2010 census, the township has a total area of 24.95 square miles (64.6 km^{2}), of which 24.82 square miles (64.3 km^{2}) (or 99.48%) is land and 0.12 square miles (0.31 km^{2}) (or 0.48%) is water.

=== Unincorporated communities ===
- Marion
