= Marion, Michigan =

- Village
- Village of Marion
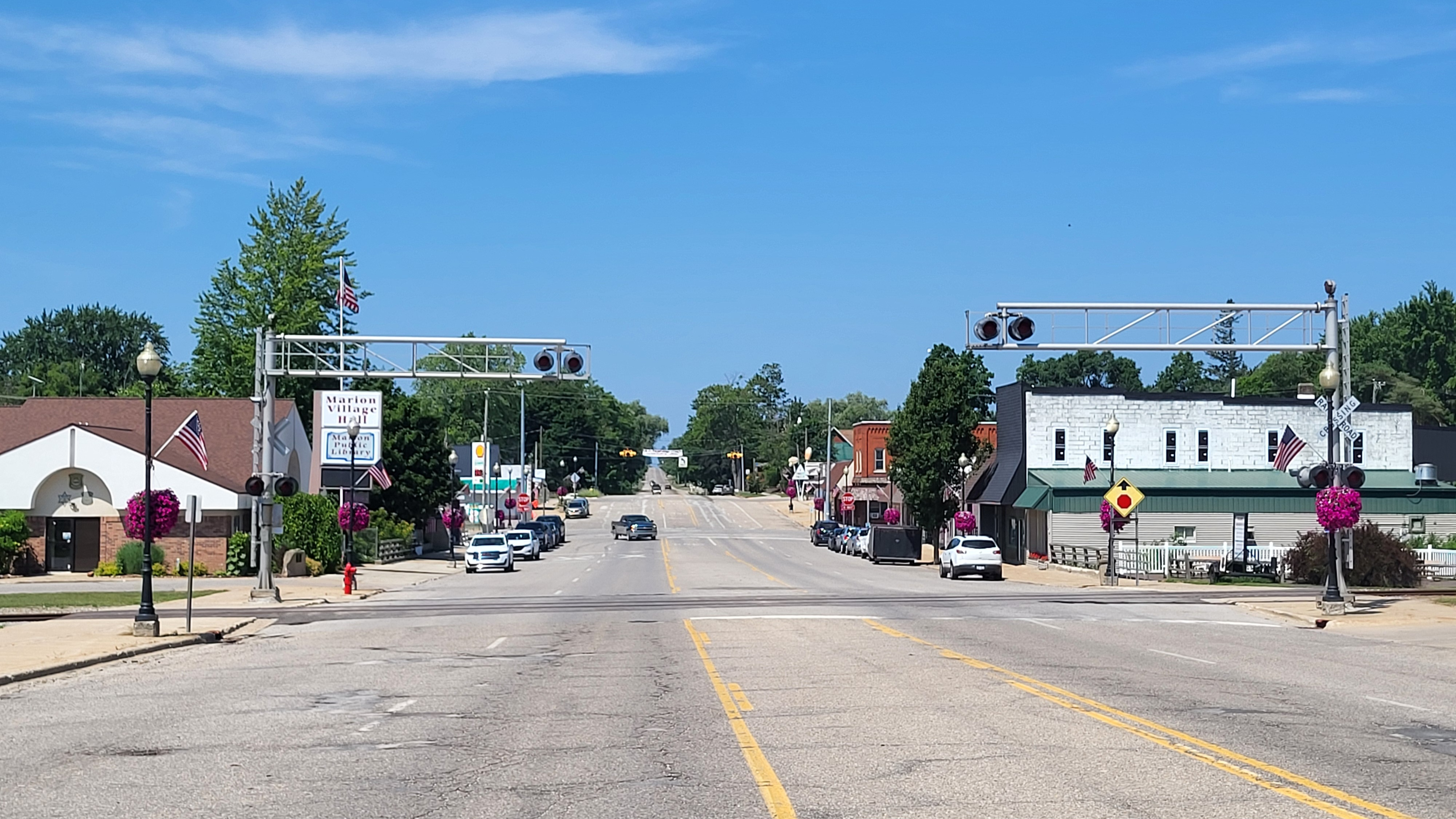
- Looking west along Main Street

- Location within Osceola County

- Location within the state of Michigan Location within the United States
- Coordinates: 44°06′10″N 85°08′49″W
- Country: United States
- State: Michigan
- County: Osceola
- Township: Marion
- Settled: 1880
- Incorporated: 1889

Government
  - Type: Village council
  - President: Flora Grundy
  - Clerk: Connie Zuiderveen

Area
  - Total: 1.33 sq mi (3.44 km^{2})
  - Land: 1.29 sq mi (3.33 km^{2})
  - Water: 0.042 sq mi (0.11 km^{2})
- Elevation: 1,099 ft (335 m)

Population (2020)
  - Total: 789
  - Density: 611.63/sq mi (236.15/km^{2})
- Time zone: UTC-5 (Eastern (EST))
  - Summer (DST): UTC-4 (EDT)
- ZIP code(s): 49665
- Area code: 231
- FIPS code: 26-51660
- GNIS feature ID: 0631557
- Website: Official website

Marion is a village in Osceola County in the U.S. state of Michigan. The population was 789 at the 2020 census. The village is located within Marion Township.

== Geography ==
According to the United States Census Bureau, the village has a total area of 1.39 square miles (3.60 km^{2}), of which 1.35 square miles (3.50 km^{2}) is land and 0.04 square miles (0.10 km^{2}) is water.

== History ==
Marion was named after Marion Clark. She and her husband Christopher settled in the area and began a logging camp with a saw mill. The Clarks also started a general store, delivered mail, and taught school.

== Demographics ==
Historical population
Census	Pop.	Note	%±
1900	741		—
1910	767		3.5%
1920	708		−7.7%
1930	607		−14.3%
1940	710		17.0%
1950	879		23.8%
1960	898		2.2%
1970	891		−0.8%
1980	816		−8.4%
1990	807		−1.1%
2000	836		3.6%
2010	872		4.3%
2020	789		−9.5%
U.S. Decennial Census

=== 2010 census ===
As of the census of 2010, there were 872 people, 351 households, and 234 families living in the village. The population density was 645.9 inhabitants per square mile (249.4/km^{2}). There were 389 housing units at an average density of 288.1 per square mile (111.2/km^{2}). The racial makeup of the village was 98.3% White, 0.1% African American, 0.5% Native American, 0.1% from other races, and 1.0% from two or more races. Hispanic or Latino of any race were 1.3% of the population.

There were 351 households, of which 36.5% had children under the age of 18 living with them, 45.6% were married couples living together, 14.2% had a female householder with no husband present, 6.8% had a male householder with no wife present, and 33.3% were non-families. 28.2% of all households were made up of individuals, and 15.3% had someone living alone who was 65 years of age or older. The average household size was 2.48 and the average family size was 2.97.

The median age in the village was 37.4 years. 27.4% of residents were under the age of 18; 8.3% were between the ages of 18 and 24; 22.9% were from 25 to 44; 24.5% were from 45 to 64; and 16.7% were 65 years of age or older. The gender makeup of the village was 47.1% male and 52.9% female.

=== 2000 census ===
As of the census of 2000, there were 836 people, 352 households, and 229 families living in the village. The population density was 617.5 inhabitants per square mile (238.4/km^{2}). There were 388 housing units at an average density of 286.6 per square mile (110.7/km^{2}). The ethnic makeup of the village was 97.97% White, 0.12% African American, 0.48% Native American, 0.12% Asian, 0.12% from other races, and 1.20% from two or more races. Hispanic or Latino of any race were 0.96% of the population.

There were 352 households, out of which 33.8% had children under the age of 18 living with them, 48.3% were married couples living together, 11.9% had a female householder with no husband present, and 34.7% were non-families. 31.0% of all households were made up of individuals, and 13.9% had someone living alone who was 65 years of age or older. The average household size was 2.38 and the average family size was 2.93.

In the village, the population was spread out, with 27.3% under the age of 18, 9.3% from 18 to 24, 26.9% from 25 to 44, 21.2% from 45 to 64, and 15.3% who were 65 years of age or older. The median age was 36 years. For every 100 females, there were 94.9 males. For every 100 females age 18 and over, there were 85.4 males.

The median income for a household in the village was $26,467, and the median income for a family was $33,750. Males had a median income of $26,900 versus $16,635 for females. The per capita income for the village was $15,010. About 14.7% of families and 19.3% of the population were below the poverty line, including 22.7% of those under age 18 and 10.9% of those age 65 or over.

== See also ==
- Marion Junior-Senior High School

== Images ==
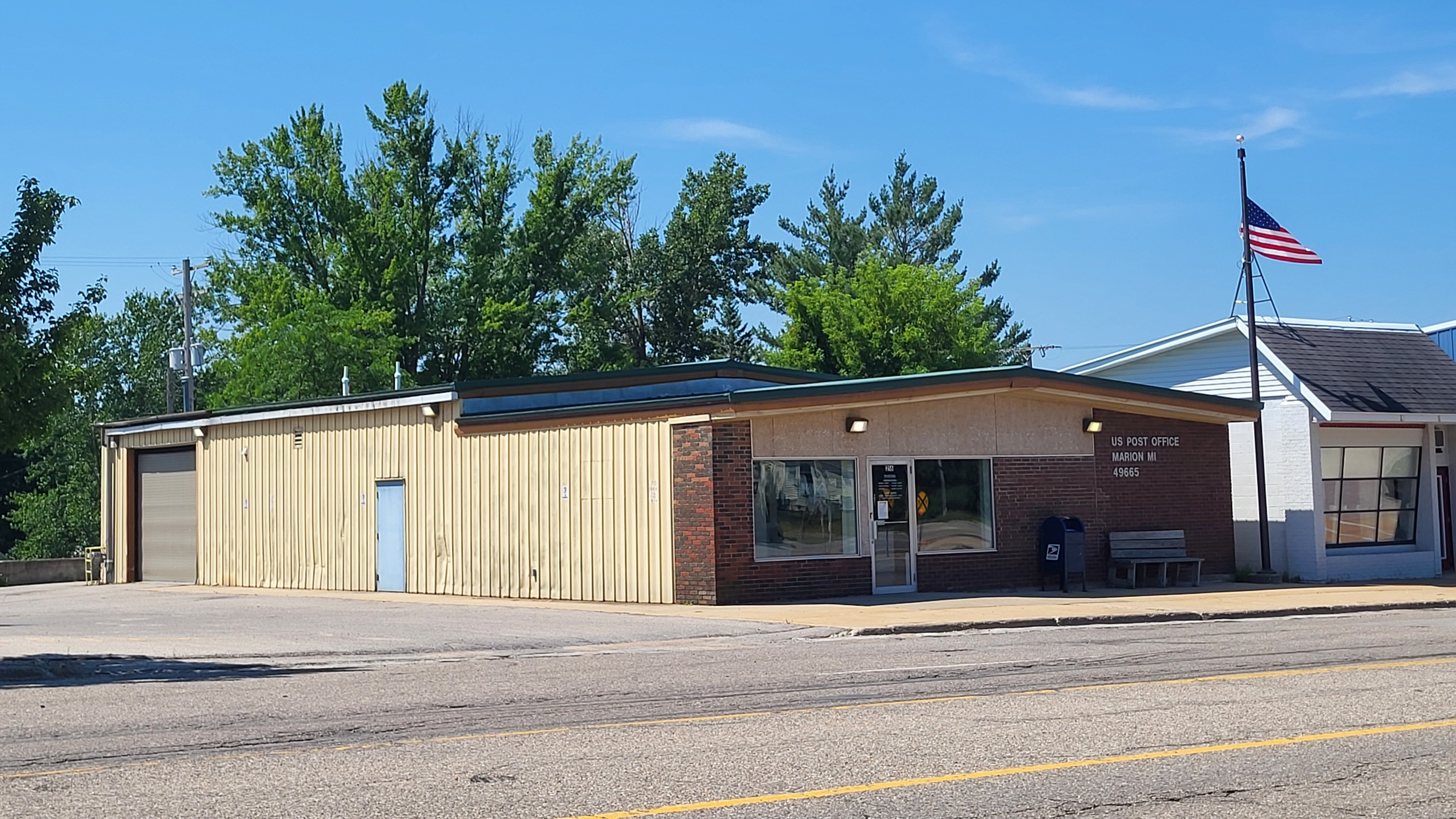
U.S. Post Office in Marion

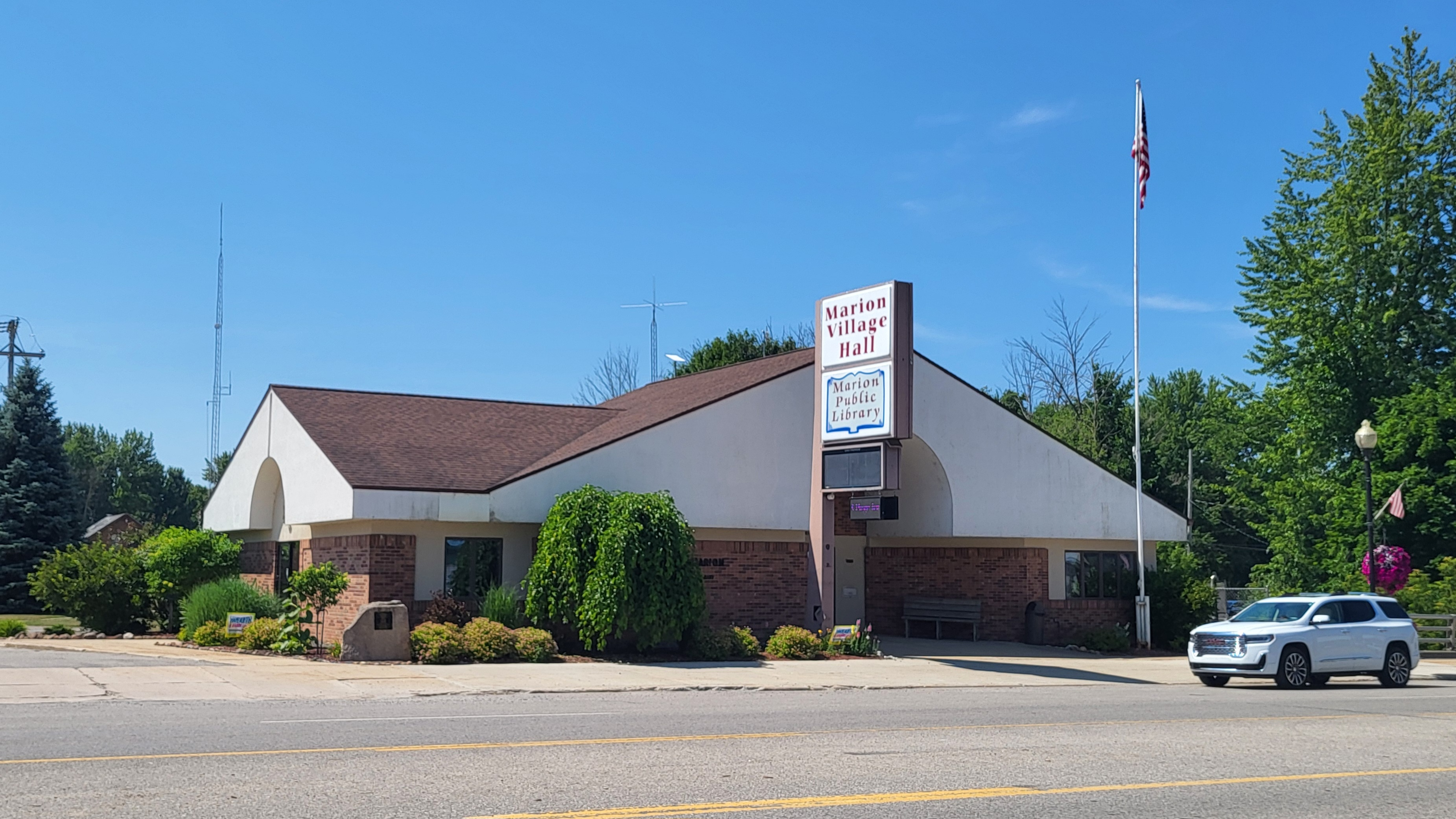
Marion village hall and library

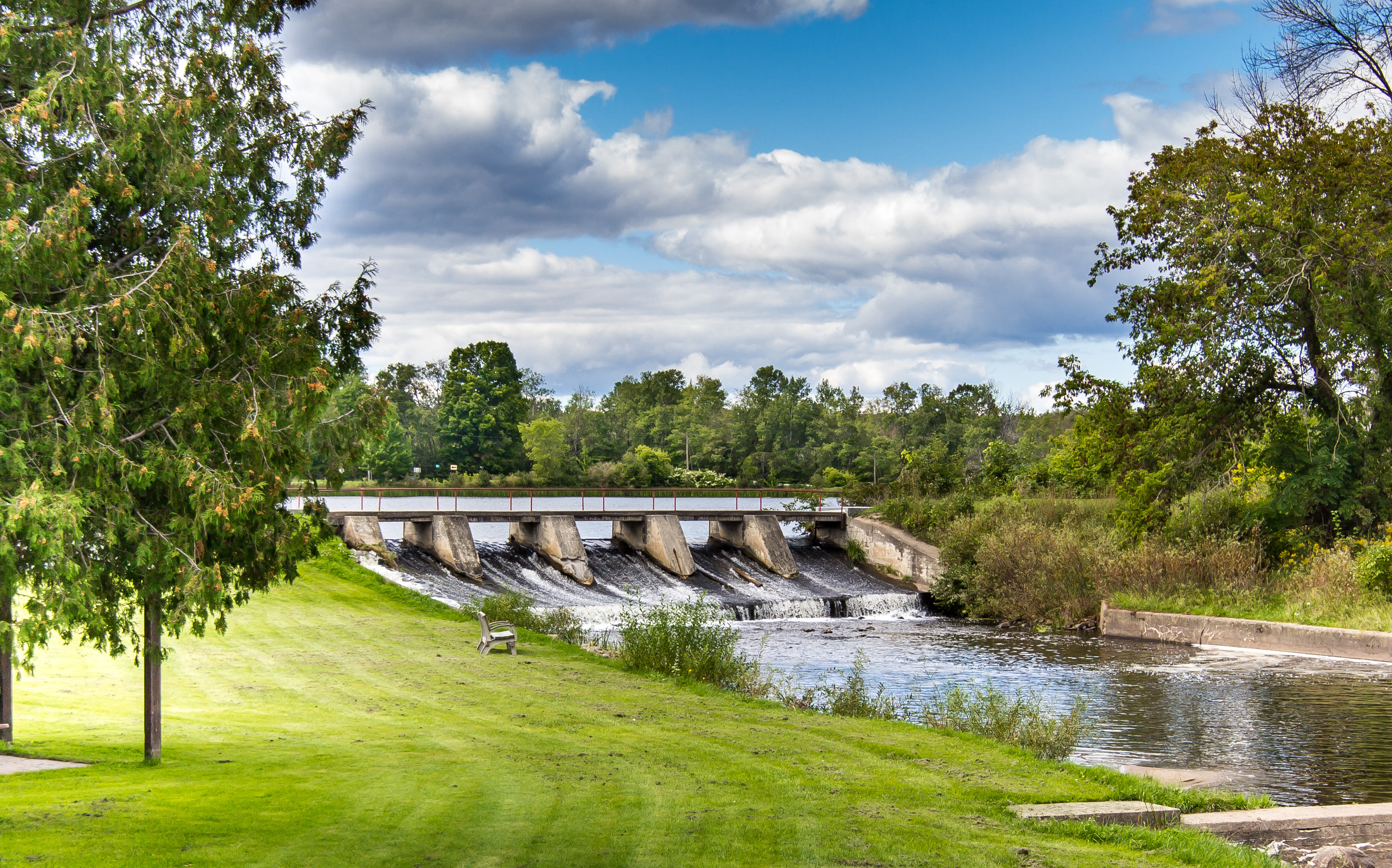
Historic Marion Dam
