= Marion, Connecticut =

- Marion Historic District
- U.S. National Register of Historic Places
- U.S. Historic district
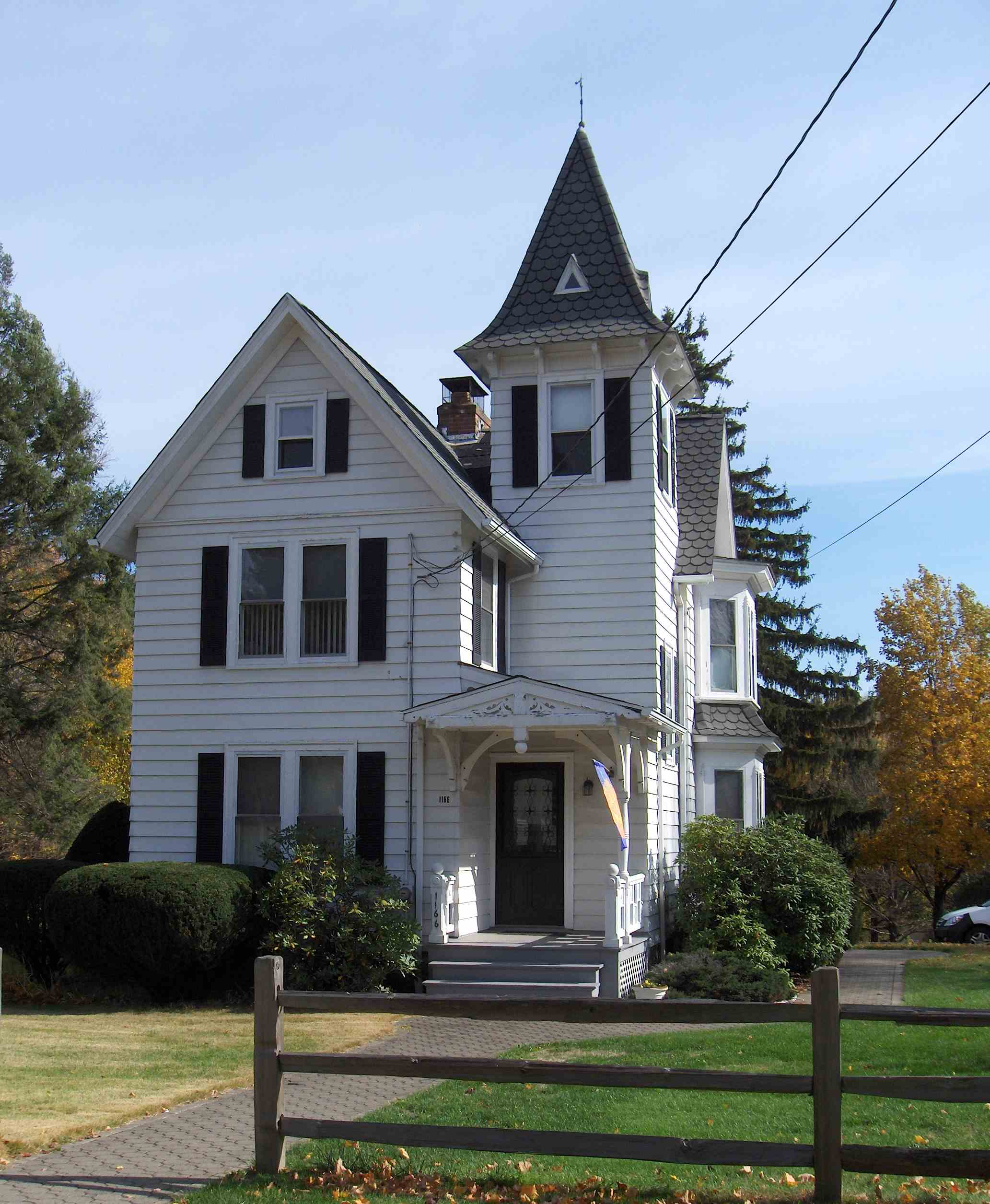
- Lester Beecher House (1166 Marion)

- Location within Connecticut Location within the United States
- Location: Along Marion Avenue and the Meriden-Waterbury Turnpike Route 322 Cheshire (New Haven County) and Southington (Hartford County), Connecticut
- Coordinates: 41°33′50″N 72°55′29″W
- Architect: Multiple
- Architectural style: Greek Revival, Italianate, Federal
- NRHP reference No.: 88001423
- Added to NRHP: December 21, 1988

Marion is a neighborhood in the town of Southington, Connecticut, United States. It is generally the area in the vicinity of the intersection of Route 322 and Marion Avenue, just North of the Cheshire Town line.

The neighborhood includes the Marion Historic District, which is listed on the National Register of Historic Places.

== Post office ==
There is a post office in Marion that was established in the 19th century. It was given the name "Marion" in reference to Marion, Alabama, where some children of prominent local residents had settled. The Marion ZIP code refers only to post office box addresses; regular mail in the Marion neighborhood is addressed as Plantsville, Connecticut.

== History ==
Marion was settled as a farming community in 1739 when land in the area was surveyed and divided. Southington was then part of the town of Farmington. The area was called "Little Plain" and extended south from French Hill to the Cheshire town line, which was south of its current position. Little Plain's location near the foot of a high ridge made its soil desirable for agriculture. The community's 18th-century farms were located along a north–south road from Bristol to New Haven (now Marion Avenue) that passed through the area.

During the American Revolutionary War, the Marion community was the site of an encampment by French General Jean-Baptiste Donatien de Vimeur, comte de Rochambeau and his troops. In June 1781, French troops under Rochambeau's command left Farmington and marched 13 miles (21 km) to Marion, where they made their eighth camp along their route through Connecticut. They remained in the area for four days. Rochambeau and his officers took shelter in Asa Barns' tavern, and the troops set up camp on a hill on the other side of the road. The area of the encampment has since become known as French Hill, and a marker on the east side of Marion Avenue commemorates the French campsite. Rochambeau revisited Barns' tavern on the return march on October 27, 1782. In 1987, the Asa Barns tavern came under the protection of the National Park Service when it was listed on the National Register of Historic Places for its architectural and historical significance. The building is now a private residence.

The Meriden-Waterbury Turnpike was extended through Marion in 1813, making the community a crossroads. Small-scale industrial activity began in the 19th century, including the manufacture of carriage bolts and nuts in the factory of L.B. Frost and Son, which began operation in Marion in 1842, using the water power of Humiston Brook.

In modern times, Marion has primarily been a suburban community. Suburban development began in 1914, when a trolley line was built between Marion and the city of Waterbury. Suburban growth continued in the subsequent decades. The period from the late 1960s through the late 1980s was one of particularly strong growth.

== Historic district designation ==
The Marion Historic District was listed on the National Register of Historic Places on December 21, 1988, as a result of a nomination submitted by the Connecticut Historical Commission in July 1988. The nomination described the district as being architecturally significant "as a collection of well-preserved buildings dating from the 18th, 19th, and early 20th centuries which together reflect the historical development of the Marion community of Southington." Contributing properties in the district were described as representing three distinct periods on Marion's history: "early agricultural development" from about 1770 to 1842, "19th-century industrial activity and community growth" from 1842 to 1900, and "early suburban growth" from 1914 to 1938.

=== Significant properties ===
The historic district includes 34 primary contributing properties, two of which are across the town line in the town of Cheshire. Architectural styles in the district include Greek Revival, Italianate and Federal. Some of the more significant properties include:

- Asa Barnes Tavern (also known as Levi B. Frost House), 1089 Marion Avenue, is now a private residence and in 1987 was added to the National Register of Historic Places.
- Barnes-Frost House
- Miles Upson House, 1316 Marion Avenue, a one-story gable front Colonial example, "perhaps the oldest house in the district to retain its original form" (See photo #3 in photos accompanying NRHP nomination)
- The Lester Beecher House, 1166 Marion Avenue, has been termed a Queen Anne style house for its irregular massing and 3 story tower.

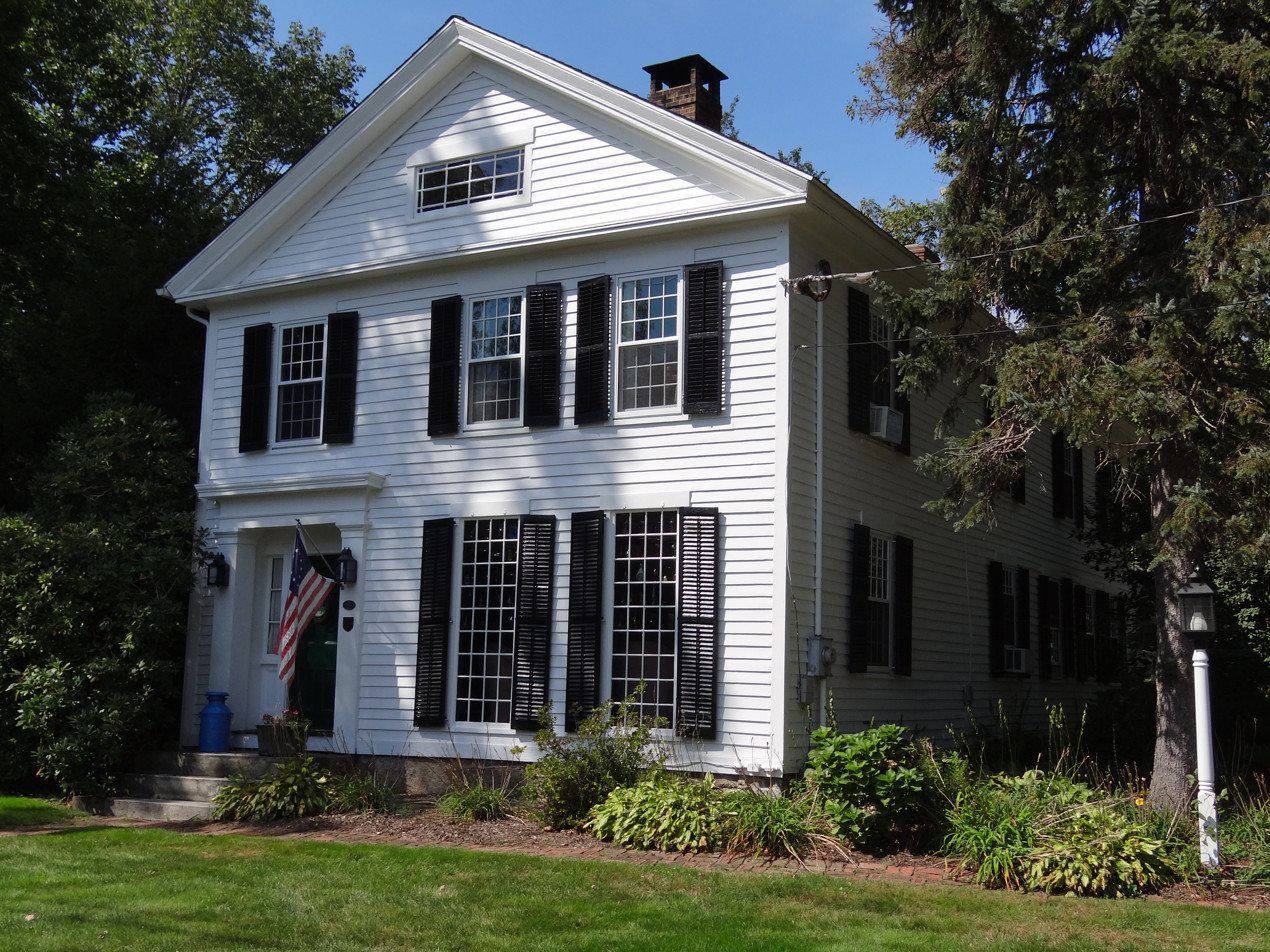
Asa Barnes Tavern/Levi B. Frost House

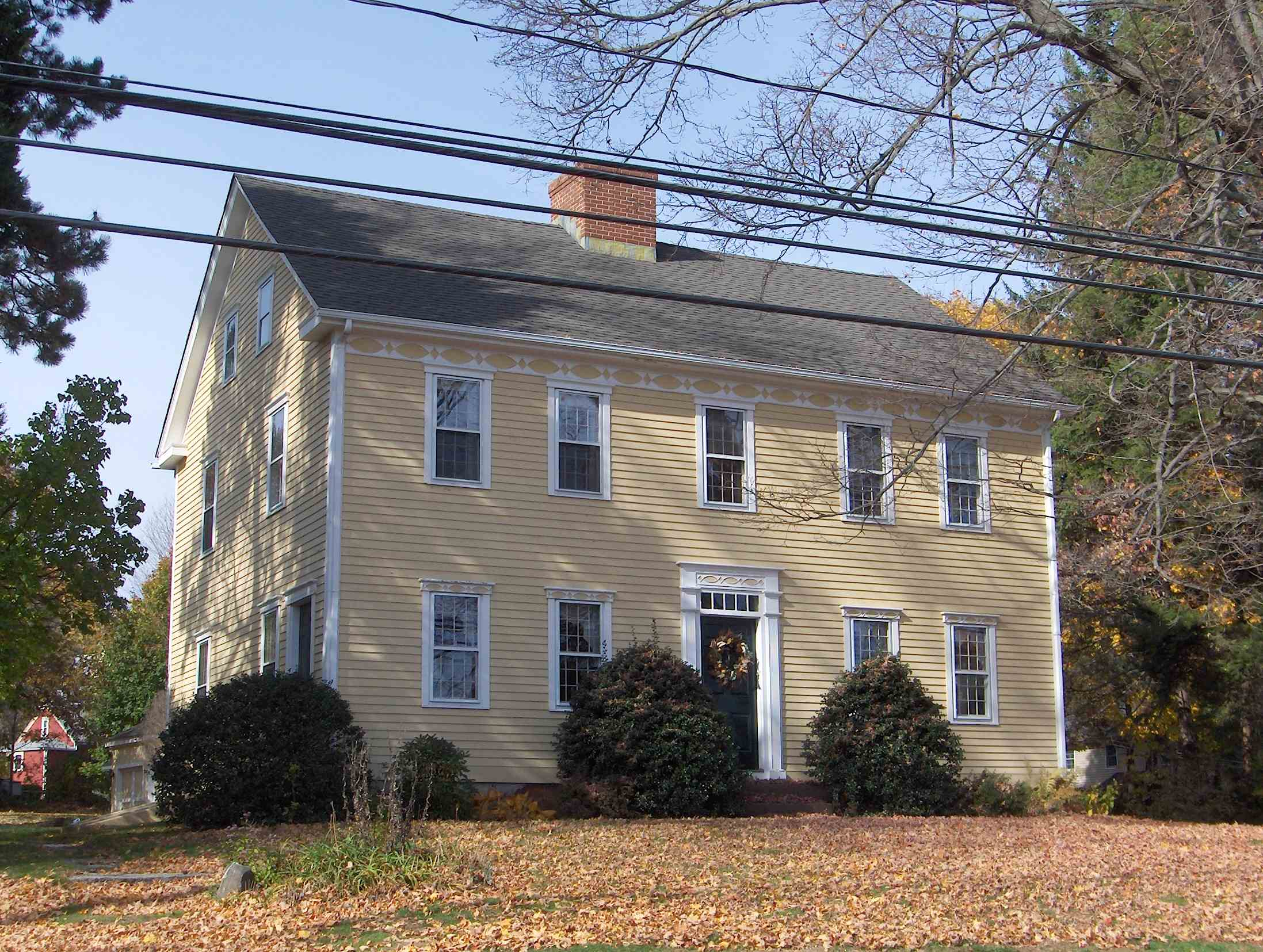
Barnes-Frost House

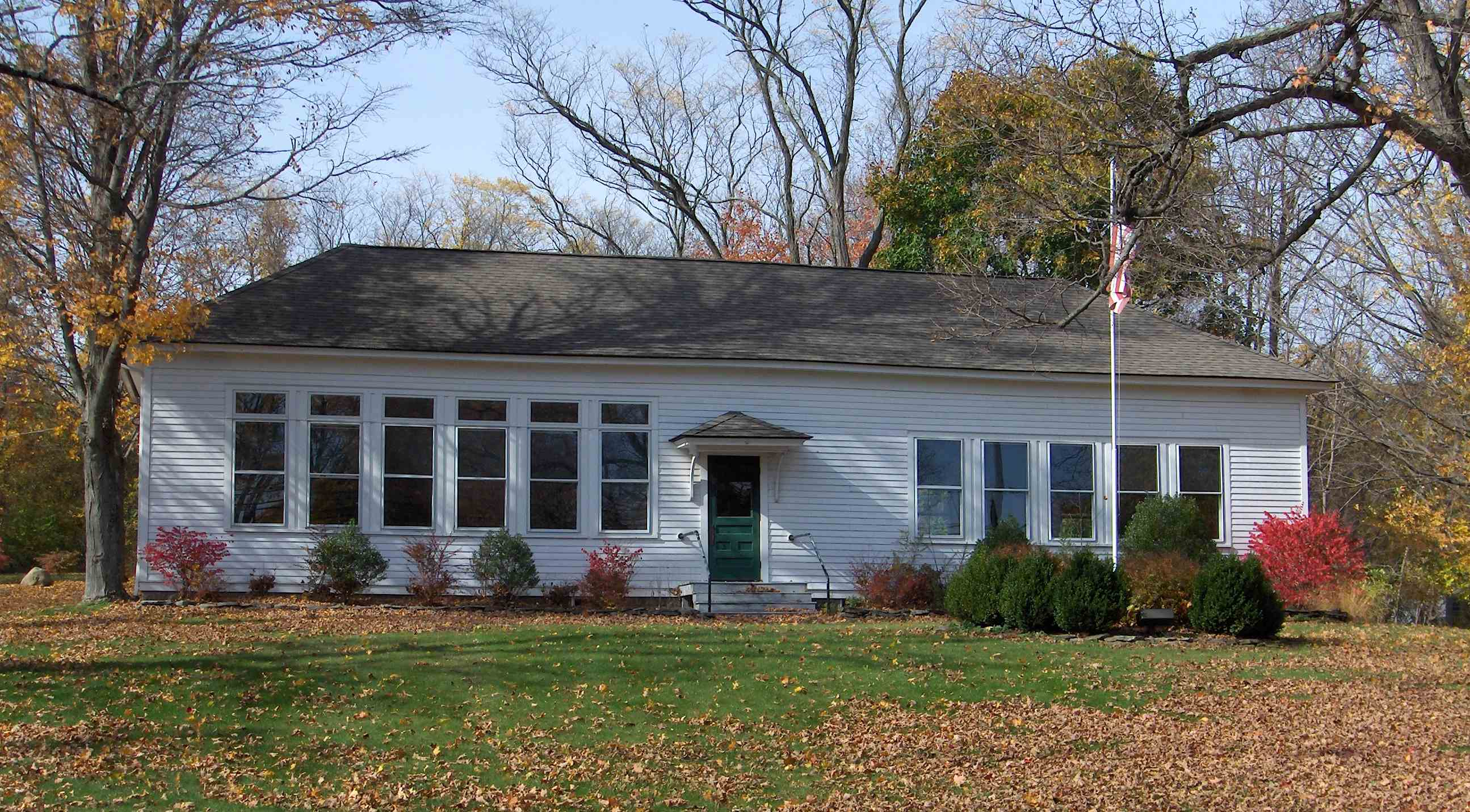
Schoolhouse on Marion Avenue

== See also ==
- List of historic sites preserved along Rochambeau's route
- National Register of Historic Places listings in Southington, Connecticut
- National Register of Historic Places listings in New Haven County, Connecticut
