= List of place names of French origin in the United States =

Several thousand place names in the United States have names of French origin, many deriving from a legacy of past French exploration or political jurisdiction, and others in honor of the American alliance with the French during the American Revolution and the founding of the country (see also New France and French in the United States). Still others were named after early Americans of French (especially Huguenot) ancestry, including Marion, Revere, Fremont, Lanier, Sevier, Macon, and Decatur.

Some places received their names as a consequence of French colonial settlement, such as Baton Rouge, Detroit, New Orleans, and Saint Louis. Nine state capitals are French words or of French origin (Baton Rouge, Boise, Des Moines, Juneau, Montgomery, Montpelier, Pierre, Richmond, and Saint Paul) – not counting Little Rock (the English translation of the original French "La Petite Roche") or Cheyenne (a French rendering of a Lakota word). Fifteen state names are either French words or of French origin (Delaware, New Jersey, Louisiana, Maine, Oregon, and Vermont) or Native American words rendered by French speakers (Arkansas, Illinois, Iowa, Kansas, Michigan, Mississippi, Ohio, and Wisconsin).

The suffix "-ville", from the French word for "city", is common in town and city names throughout the United States. Many originally French place names, possibly hundreds, in the Midwest and Upper West were replaced with directly translated English names once American settlers became locally dominant (e.g. La Petite Roche became Little Rock, Baie Verte became Green Bay, and Grandes Fourches became Grand Forks).

== Alabama ==
- Barbour County (named for James Barbour, 19th-century U.S. Senator from Virginia)
- Bay Minette (named for a French surveyor with the last name of Minet)
- Bayou la Batre ("Bayou of the Battery") (Note: Coulet du Gard & Coulet du Gard 1974, p. 1 suggests that this town is named for a French settler.)
- Belle Fontaine ("Beautiful Fountain")
- Belle Mina ("belle" meaning beautiful + mina)
- Bon Air ("good air")
- Bon Secour ("good rescue")
- Centreville ("city centre"; note the "-re" spelling, as opposed to "-er")
- Citronelle (named after the citrus trees)
- Daphne
- Dauphin Island (originally named Ile Dauphine after Marie Adélaïde of Savoy, the Dauphine (crown princess) of France in 1711)
- DeArmanville
- Decatur (named for Stephen Decatur, U.S. navy officer of French descent)
- Decatur County (named for Stephen Decatur, U.S. navy officer of French descent)
- Delchamps (named for a postmaster)
- Detroit
- Dozier (d'osier means "of wicker" in French)
- Fayette County (for Gilbert du Motier, Marquis de Lafayette)
- Gasque (named for a state representative)
- Grand Bay
- Grande Batture Islands
- Isle aux Dames ("Island of the Ladies")
- Isle aux Herbes ("Island of the Herbs")
- LaFayette (for the Marquis de Lafayette)
- Lamar County (named for Lucius Quintus Cincinnatus Lamar, former Confederate officer and U.S. Secretary of the Interior, of French Huguenot descent)
- Lanett (for a settler named Lanet)
- Lapine ("rabbit")
- Le Moyne ("the monk", old spelling)
- Leroy (le roi, meaning "king")
- Magnolia (named for the plant, itself named for French botanist Pierre Magnol)
- Marion (named after Francis Marion, patriot of the American Revolution and of Huguenot ancestry)
- Mentone (after Menton, France)
- Mobile (French name for the indigenous Mauvilla tribe)
- Mobile County
- Moulton (after a settler)
- Mon Louis (named for nearby Mon Louis Island, itself named by Nicholas Baudin, Sieur de Miragouin, in honor of his French native city Montlouis-sur-Loire)
- Ozark
- Perdue Hill
- Piedmont
- Semmes (for Raphael Semmes)
- Vinemont (from "Vigne Mont", meaning "Grape Mountain")

== Alaska ==
- Flambeau River
- Gastineau Channel (for John Gastineau, an English civil engineer and surveyor with a French surname; compare Gatineau, Quebec)
- Juneau (for Joseph Juneau, a French-Canadian prospector and gold miner)
- La Chaussée Spit at the entrance of Lituya Bay (named originally in charts prepared by French explorer Jean-François de Galaup, comte de La Pérouse, in 1786; La Chaussée means "causeway")
- Mount La Pérouse (3231 m) and La Pérouse Glacier in the Fairweather Range of Alaska, both named after French explorer and naval captain Jean-François de Galaup, comte de La Pérouse
- Latouche Island ("the touch")
- Lemesurier Island
- Mount Crillon (for Felix-Francois-Dorothee de Bretton, Comte de Crillon)

== Arizona ==
- Bellemont, Arizona ("beautiful mountain")
- Chevelon Creek
- Clemenceau (named after the French prime minister during World War I)
- Picket Wire (a corruption of the French Purgatoire, "Purgatory")
- Peridot

== Arkansas ==
- Arkansas (named by French explorers from an aboriginal word meaning "south wind")
- Antoine ("Anthony")
- Aurelle
- Auvergne (a French region)
- Barraque Township (named for French émigré Antoine Barraqué)
- Bauxite, Arkansas
- Bayou
- Bayou Meto, Arkansas County, Arkansas
- Bayou Meto, Lonoke County, Arkansas
- Beauchamp (fair or beautiful field or plain)
- Beaudry
- Belleaire (from "belle aire", beautiful place)
- Belleville ("beautiful city")
- Bellefonte (possibly from belle fontaine, "beautiful fountain")
- Boeuf ("beef")
- Bonair ("good air")
- Buie
- Burdette
- Cache
- Cadron ("sun dial")
- Calumet (the French word for a Native American tobacco pipe)
- Calvin (for the famous French Protestant John Calvin)
- Champagnolle (meaning a person from Champagne)
- Chancel
- Chicot County (from chicot, "stump")
- Claude
- Cloquet
- Cossatot River ("tomahawk")
- Dardanelle
- Darcy
- DeGray Lake ("sandstone")
- De Roche ("of the rock")
- Deberrie
- Decatur
- Delaplaine (surname meaning "of the plains")
- Departee
- Devue
- Des Arc ("at the bend")
- Dumas (French surname, possibly for Alexandre Dumas)
- Ecore Fabre
- Fayetteville (named for the Marquis de La Fayette)
- Fontaine ("fountain", a surname)
- Fourche ("pitchfork")
- Fourche Lafave
- Fourche Valley
- Francure
- Frenchman's Bayou
- Galla Rock (from gallets, meaning "pebbles")
- Gallatin
- Glazypeau Mountain (Anglicization of "Glaise à Paul", meaning "Paul's clay pit")
- Grand Glaise ("Large Clay")
- Gravette
- Guion, Arkansas (named for a railroad conductor of French-Canadian descent)
- La Fave ("bean")
- La Grue ("the crane")
- La Grue Springs
- Lacrosse
- Ladelle
- Lafayette County
- LaGrange ("the barn", possibly referring to the plantation of the Marquis de Lafayette)
- Lamartine (for French author Alphonse de Lamartine; also a surname)
- L'Aigle Creek ("the eagle")
- L'Anguille ("The Eel")
- Lapile ("a pile"; possibly a surname)
- Larue ("the street")
- Latour ("the tower")
- Lave Creek
- Levesque ("Bishop", a common French-Canadian surname)
- L'Eau Frais Creek ("fresh water")
- Macon (French city Mâcon)
- Magnolia, Arkansas (named for the plant, itself named for French botanist Pierre Magnol)
- Marais Saline ("salt marsh")
- Marche
- Maumee
- Maumelle ("breasts")
- Monette
- Mont Sandels
- Montreal ("royal mount")
- Moreau ("feedbag"; probably a family's proper name)
- Mount Magazine (from magasin, meaning barn or warehouse)
- New Gascony (Gascony, France)
- Ozan, Arkansas
- Ozark (phonetic rendering of either aux Arks, "of the Ark(ansas)" or aux Arcs, "of the arches", or possibly aux arcs-en-ciel, "of the rainbows")
- Ozark Mountains, as per immediately above
- Paris
- Paroquet
- Partain
- Petit Jean ("Little John", named after a French sailor on the Arkansas River)
- Pollard
- Prairie County
- Saline County
- Sans Souci (literally "without concern")
- Segur (French city)
- Sevier County
- Smackover (Anglicization of chemin couvert, "covered way")
- Soudan
- St. Francis County
- Terre Noire ("black earth")
- Terre Rouge ("redland" or "red earth")
- Tollette
- Tully
- Urbanette
- Vallier (French surname)
- Vaucluse (French region)
- Vaugine Township (named for 19th-century landowner Francis Vaugine)
- Vidette
- Villemont (named for 19th-century landowner Carlos de Villemont)
- Villemont Township (named for 19th-century landowner Carlos de Villemont)

== California ==
- Alsace (region in France bordering Germany)
- Artois (named after Artois, France)
- Auburn
- Beaumont
- Bel Air ("beautiful air")
- Belfort ("beautiful fort")
- Belmont ("beautiful mount")
- Bettravia (betterave, meaning beet)
- Bijou ("gem")
- Bonnefoy ("good faith")
- Bouquet Canyon
- Butte County
- Chalfant
- Claremont ("clear mountain")
- Concord (from French concorde meaning agreement, harmony, or union)
- Coutolenc (after a French factory owner)
- Declezville (after a French factory owner)
- Delano (after Columbus Delano, a scion of the famous Delano family, originally Huguenots named "De Lannoye")
- Disneyland (after Walt Disney, a descendant of the Norman family d'Isigny, who resided in Isigny, Normandie, France)
- Fremont (named for John C. Frémont, American soldier, explorer and politician of French ancestry)
- Friant (named for a sugar farmer)
- Gasquet (named for a settler from France)
- Giraud Peak (named for Pierre Giraud (1874–1907), a French shepherd of Inyo County made famous in Mary Austin's 1906 book The Flock)
- Guerneville (named for Swiss immigrant George Guerne, a local businessman of the 19th century who owned the town's sawmill)
- Huron
- Lafayette (named for the Marquis de La Fayette)
- La Grange ("the barn", after Lafayette's home in France)
- La Grange Reservoir
- La Porte ("the door")
- La Verne
- Lebec (le bec, "the beak")
- Le Grand ("the big")
- Montague ("pointed hill")
- Montclair ("clear mountain")
- Montrose ("rose mountain")
- Nice (after the city of the same name in France)
- Nord ("north") (Note: Gudde 1998, p. 263 suggests this town was named from German, which also has "Nord" as its word for "North".)
- Normandie Avenue, a major street in Los Angeles
- Orleans (after the city of the same name in France)
- Piedmont (French spelling of the Piedmont region of Italy)
- Richmond (after the Virginia city of the same name, which itself has French origins)
- Rubidoux (named for early settler Louis Rubidoux)
  - Mount Rubidoux
- San Francisco (named after Saint Francis of Assisi, who had received that name because his mother was French or as a tribute to France)
- Sicard Flat
- Simmler
- Vichy Springs (after the city of the same name in France)

== Colorado ==
- Ault
- Bellevue ("beautiful sight" or "beautiful view")
- Berthoud (named for Edward L. Berthoud, a Swiss-born military officer, statesman and engineer in the western United States during the late 19th century)
- Berthoud Pass and town of Berthoud
- Bethune (named for Béthune)
- Bijou Creek (from bijoux meaning "jewel"; possibly also after Joseph Bijeau)
- Cache La Poudre River ("hide the powder" or "powder cache")
- Calumet
- De Beque
- Florissant ("flowering")
- Fremont County (for John C. Frémont)
- Grand County
- Lafayette
- Lamar
- Laporte ("the door"; also a common French-Canadian surname)
- La Salle ("the room"; also a common French surname)
- Louisville (for a coal miner)
- Louviers (after Louviers, by way of the town in Delaware)
- Lyons (a city in France)
- Mount Audubon (for French-American naturalist John James Audubon)
- Montclair ("bright mountain" or "clear mountain")
- Montrose ("rose-mount")
- Montrose County
- North and South Platte Rivers (platte meaning "dull, shallow, flat")
- Parachute
- Parachute Creek
- Platteville
- Poudre Park ("gunpowder")
- Purgatoire River
- St. Vrain Creek (after French-American fur trader Ceran St. Vrain)
- Sublette
- Vernon

== Connecticut ==
- Ballouville
- Montville
- Pomfret Landing
- Vernon
- Versailles
- Versailles Pond in New London County

== Delaware ==
- Delaware named after Lord de la Warre (Anglo-Norman surname originally de la Guerre, meaning "of the war")
- Bellefonte ("beautiful fountain")
- Bellevue ("beautiful view")
- Granogue
- Guyencourt
- Magnolia
- Montchanin

== Florida ==
- Abbeville Road
- Amiens Way
- Antibes Street
- Avalon
- Barrineau Park
- Bayou George
- Belandville (failed "colony" in northern Santa Rosa County, approximately one mile south of its border with Escambia County, Alabama)
- Belle Glade ("beautiful" glade)
- Belle Isle ("beautiful" island)
- Belleview ("beautiful" view)
- Belfort Road
- Belmont
- Bermont
- Bordeaux Villages
- Boulogne (after the city of the same name in France)
- Brevard County
- Brittany
- Cambon
- Cannes Street
- Chancey
- Chantilly Acres
- Clermont
- Decatur Avenue
- Destin ("destiny")
- Dijon Drive
- DuBois Park
- Dupont
- DuPuis Reserve
- Duval County (named for William Pope DuVal)
- Eau Gallie ("rocky water")
- Eloise
- Fort Caroline
- Fontainebleau
- Frontenac
- Grenoble Drive
- Huguenot Lagoon
- Huguenot Memorial Park
- Isle of Normandy
- LaBelle ("the beauty", "the beautiful" or "beautiful woman")
- LaCrosse
- Lafayette County (after the Marquis de Lafayette)
- Lafayette (after the Marquis de Lafayette)
- Lafayette Oaks
- La Grange
- La Rochelle Drive
- Lake Beauclair
- Lake Lorraine
- Le Havre Drive
- Le Palais (after the commune of the same name in France)
- Lorraine
- Lyons (derived from Lyon)
- Lyons Park
- Macon, Leon County
- Macon
- Marion County (after Revolutionary War officer Francis Marion, who had French ancestry)
- Marseilles
- Mascotte ("mascot")
- Metz Road
- Monet
- Montclair ("bright mountain")
- Montpelier Villages
- Montreal Drive
- Navarre (after Navarre)
- Navarre Beach
- Normandy Beach
- Normandy Estates
- Normandy Manor
- Normandy Shores
- Normandy Village
- Normandy, Duval County
- Orleans Lane
- Paris Lane
- Pass-a-Grille
- Pierre Lane
- Port Saint Lucie (Lucie is French for Lucy)
- Poitier Drive (derived from Poitiers)
- Provence
- Rennes Lane
- Ribault River (named for Jean Ribault leader of the Huguenot colony Fort Caroline in early Florida whose inhabitants were massacred by the Spanish)
- St. Cloud (after the Château de Saint-Cloud)
- Toulouse Lane
- Versailles

== Georgia ==
- Abbeville
- Beaulieu ("pretty place")
- Berrien County
- Bonaire ("good air")
- Clermont ("clear mountain")
- Decatur
- Decatur County
- Devereux, Georgia
- Du Pont (for the Du Pont family)
- Fannin County
- Fayette County (named for the Marquis de Lafayette)
- Fayetteville (named for the Marquis de Lafayette)
- Girard (for Stephen Girard)
- LaFayette (named for the Marquis de Lafayette)
- LaGrange ("The Barn", the home of the Marquis de Lafayette)
- Lamar County (for Lucius Quintus Cincinnatus Lamar)
- Lanier County
- Laurens County (for John Laurens)
- Louisville (for Louis XVI)
- Macon ("mason", named for Nathaniel Macon)
- Macon County("mason", named for Nathaniel Macon)
- Marion (for Francis Marion)
- Marion County (for Francis Marion)
- Moultrie (for William Moultrie)
- Valdosta (named after the French-speaking region of Val d'Aoste in the Italian Alps)

== Hawaii ==
- Fort DeRussy (named for General René Edward De Russy and his brother Lewis, soldiers of Huguenot ancestry)
- French Frigate Shoals
- La Pérouse Bay named after Jean-François de Galaup, comte de Lapérouse, first European to visit the island of Maui
- La Pérouse Pinnacle located in the French Frigate Shoals, Hawai'i
- Necker Island named for Jacques Necker

== Idaho ==
- Arbon
- Bellevue ("Beautiful View")
- Blanchard (French surname)
- Boise (from boisé, "Wooded")
- Bonneville County (named after Benjamin Louis Eulalie de Bonneville (1796–1878), a French-born officer in the United States Army, fur trapper and explorer)
- Bovard
- Bruneau (French surname)
- Cache ("hidden")
- Coeur d'Alene ("Heart of the Awl")
- Culdesac ("Dead End")
- Dubois (named for Idaho politician Fred Dubois, the grandson of Montreal native Toussaint Dubois)
- Fremont County (named for John C. Frémont)
- Grandjean
- Grangeville ("barn city")
- Grasmere ("fat mother")
- Jacques
- Labelle
- Laclede (named for French-Canadian pioneer Pierre Laclède)
- La Fleur ("the Flower")
- Lake Pend Oreille ("hanging ear")
- Malad City (from malade, French for "sick")
- Michaud (French surname from Michel (Michael))
- Monteview
- Montour
- Montpelier
- Nez Perce County (from the Nez Perce Tribe's name "nez percé" meaning "pierced nose")
- Paris
- Payette (named for French-Canadian fur trapper François Payette)
- Pierre's Hole (named for Pierre Tivanitagon, a Hudson's Bay Company trader said to be of Iroquois descent)
- Ponderay (from pend oreille, "earring")
- Simplot
- St. Maries
- Teton ("Teat")
- Thiard

== Illinois ==
- Illinois, French version of Illini, a local Native American tribe
- Illinois River
- Beaucoup Creek (plenty good)
- Belle Rive ("Beautiful Bank") (French military commander)
- Belleville ("Beautiful City")
- Belleview ("Beautiful View")
- Bellmont ("Beautiful Mountain")
- Bonpas Creek ("Good Step")
- Bourbon (named after the House of Bourbon)
- Bourbonnais (named for François Bourbonnais, Sr., a fur trader)
- Bureau County ("Office"; named for trader Pierre de Bureau)
- Cache River (hidden river)
- Calumet City ("little reed," used to refer to peace pipes)
- Champaign (from Champaigne, a French surname)
- Chicago, although not a French place name in itself, shikaakwa or "wild onion" in the Native-American Miami-Illinois language, the pronunciation of the "chi" (as opposed to the "chi" as in China) is the result of early French settlement
- Claremont ("Clear Mountain")
- Colmar (after the Alsatian city)
- Creve Coeur ("Heartbreak"; early French fort)
- Decatur (named for Stephen Decatur)
- DePue (named for an early French fur trader by the name of De Pue)
- Des Plaines ("of the Plains")
- Des Plaines River
- Detroit ("Narrow Passage")
- Du Bois (from the woods)
- DuPage County
- DuPage River
- Du Quoin (name of an Illiniwek chief)
- Durand (named for Henri Durand, a railroader)
- Embarrass ("Predicament")
- Fayette County (after LaFayette)
- Fort de Chartres (named for Louis, duc de Chartres)
- Fort Massac (named for the Marquis de Massac)
- Girard (named for financier Stephen Girard)
- Hennepin (named in honor of the 17th-century French explorer Father Louis Hennepin)
- Joliet (named after explorer Louis Jolliet)
- La Clede, Illinois (named for Pierre Laclède)
- La Fayette
- La Grange ("The Barn")
- La Harpe (named for Bernard La Harpe, an explorer)
- La Moille
- La Moine River ("The Monk", after an early monastery)
- La Salle (named after explorer René-Robert Cavelier, Sieur de La Salle. La Salle literally means "the Hall.")
- L'erable, Illinois ("the maples," Settled by French Canadians)
- Le Roy ("the King")
- Libertyville
- Lisle, Illinois
- Macon, Illinois
- Magnolia
- Marion (names for Francis Marion)
- Marseilles (after Marseille)
- Massac (French Minister)
- Menard County (after Pierre Menard)
- Meredosia ("reed marsh")
- Normandy
- Paris
- Peoria
- Pere Marquette River
- Prairie du Rocher ("Prairie of the Rock")
- Rochelle
- St. Anne (Anne is spelled in French. Founded by French-speaking Canadians. See Charles Chiniquy)
- St. Georges (Note: retains the silent "s" from the French)
- Ste. Marie
- Sublette
- Toulon
- Vergennes (named for Charles Gravier, comte de Vergennes)
- Vermilion County
- Vermont ("Green Mountain")
- Versailles (for the French city and palace)

== Indiana ==
- Bourbon
- Clermont
- Decatur (named for Stephen Decatur)
- Decatur County (named for Stephen Decatur)
- Delaware County
- De Motte ("the mound")
- Dubois County (named for Toussaint Dubois)
- Dupont
- Dunkirk
- Fayette
- Fayette County (named for the French general, Marquis de Lafayette)
- Fremont
- French Lick
- Fugit
- Jay County
- La Crosse
- La Fontaine ("the fountain")
- La Porte (named by French explorers travelling up from the south, this area was the first clearing or "door" out of the heavy woods to the south.)
- La Porte County
- Lafayette (named for the French general, Marquis de Lafayette)
- LaGrange County
- Leroy
- Ligonier
- Marion
- Marion County (like the city, named for first generation French-American Francis Marion)
- Montpelier
- Napoleon
- Notre Dame ("Our Lady")
- Orleans (named in commemoration of the Battle of New Orleans)
- Portage
- Saint Croix
- Saint Leon
- Saint Maurice (named for a Catholic bishop, Jacques-Maurice De Saint Palais)
- St. Paul
- San Pierre
- Sedan (named for the French city)
- Terre Haute ("High Ground")
- Vernon
- Versailles
- Vevay (named for the Swiss commune)
- Vincennes (named for François Marie Bissot, Sieur de Vincennes)

== Iowa ==
- Audubon (named for John James Audubon)
- Belle Plaine ("beautiful plain")
- Belleville
- Bellevue ("beautiful view")
- Belmond
- Belmont
- Bennezette
- Blanchard
- Bonaparte
- Bondurant
- Boyer (named for the Boyer River, itself named for an early settler)
- Calumet
- Chariton
- Clarion
- Clermont
- Clutier
- Couler Valley ("To Flow," also namesake for the Couler Creek)
- Decatur City (named for Stephen Decatur, U.S. navy officer of French descent)
- Decatur County (named for Stephen Decatur, U.S. navy officer of French descent)
- Des Moines 41°35′27″N 93°37′15″W (from Rivière des Moines, "River of the Monks", the river flowing through the city)
- Dubuque (named after explorer Julien Dubuque)
- Dumont (French surname)
- Durant (French surname)
- Fayette (named for Gilbert du Motier, the Marquis de Lafayette)
- Fontanelle
- Fort de la Trinité
- Fremont (named for John C. Frémont)
- Giard
- Granville ("large town")
- Lafayette (named for Gilbert du Motier, the Marquis de Lafayette)
- Lamont ("the mountain")
- La Grange ("The Barn")
- La Motte (named for Pierre La Motte, 17th-century French captain in New France)
- La Porte ("The Door")
- Le Claire (named for Antoine Le Claire, a Métis trader of First Nations-French Canadian descent)
- Le Grand ("The Great") (Note: Savage 2007, p. 129 states that this place was named for a local attorney, Le Grand Byington.)
- Le Mars ("March")
- Le Roy ("The King", also a surname)
- Luzerne (after Lucerne)
- Lyons (named after the French city, Lyon)
- Magnolia
- Marion, Iowa (named after Francis Marion, Revolutionary War hero of a S. Carolinian French Huguenot family)
- Marquette (named for Jacques Marquette)
- Martelle
- Massena (named for André Masséna)
- Massilon (named for Jean Baptiste Massillon)
- Montour (named for an early settler)
- Montpelier
- Orleans (French city of Orléans or possibly New Orleans, Louisiana)
- Paris
- Platte
- Prairie
- Rinard
- Tête des Morts ("Head of the Dead Ones")

== Kansas ==
- Aulne
- Bazine (named for François Achille Bazaine)
- Beaumont ("beautiful mountain")
- Bellefonte ("beautiful spring")
- Belleville
- Belle Plaine ("beautiful plain")
- Beloit (named after the city in Wisconsin)
- Belpre ("beautiful prairie")
- Belvue ("beautiful view")
- Blue River (originally named "L'Eau Bleue" by French settlers)
- Boicourt
- Bourbon County
- Damar (named for a French settler)
- Decatur County (named for Stephen Decatur)
- DeMunn (named for Jules de Mun)
- Detroit (named for the city in Michigan)
- Dubuque (named for the city in Iowa)
- Duluth (named for the city in Minnesota)
- Frontenac (named for Louis de Buade de Frontenac)
- Geneva (named for the city in Switzerland)
- Girard (named for Stephen Girard)
- Hugoton (named for Victor Hugo)
- La Cygne ("The Swan"; after the Marais des Cygnes River, which was named by French explorers)
- La Harpe (named for Jean-Baptiste Bénard de la Harpe)
- Labette County (named after Pierre La Bette, an early settler of French origin)
- Lafontaine ("the fountain")
- Lecompton (named for Samuel Dexter Lecompte, descendant of French Huguenots who was the chief justice of the territorial Supreme Court)
- LeLoup ("the Wolf")
- Louisburg (named after St. Louis, Missouri)
- Louisville (named for a French settler)
- Lucerne ("alfalfa")
- Mankato (likely from "monecato," meaning "blue earth")
- Marais des Cygnes River ("marsh of the swans")
- Marion County (named for Francis Marion)
- Marmaton River ("marmot")
- Marquette (named for Jacques Marquette)
- Neuchatel (named for the city in Switzerland)
- Offerle (named for a French settler)
- Paola (named for a French settler)
- Piedmont ("foothills")
- Reno County, named after Major General Jesse Lee Reno, a Union officer killed in the American Civil War. (Reno's family name was a modified version of the French surname "Renault".)
- Saline River ("salt")
- St. Francis
- Sedan (named for the French city)
- Solomon River (likely named after Edme Gatien de Salmon, a French colonial official)
- Smoky Hill River (This river was originally named "La Fourche de la Côte Boucanée," or "hill of barbecues." The translation comes from explorer Zebulon Pike.)
- Sublette, Kansas (named for William Sublette, who was of French Huguenot descent)
- Toulon (most likely named for the French city)
- Verdigris River
- Wyandotte County, French spelling of the name of an Indian tribe who were also known as the Hurons by the French in Canada

== Kentucky ==
Cities

- Beaumont ("Beautiful Mountain")
- Bellefonte ("Beautiful Furnace")
- Bellemeade
- Bellevue ("Beautiful Sight")
- Belmont ("Beautiful Mountain" or possibly a local settler) (Note: Rennick 1984, p. 20 suggests that this town's originated with a furnace belonging to the Belmont family.)
- Carcasonne (for the city in France)
- Clermont ("Clear Mountain")
- Etoile ("Star")
- La Center ("the Center") (Note: Rennick 1984, p. 163 states that the town was originally named "La Centre," but the spelling was anglicized by the postal service.)
- La Grange (Named for the Château de la Grange-Bléneau, the French estate of the Marquis de Lafayette)
- LaFayette (named for Gilbert du Motier, Marquis de La Fayette)
- Lamont ("the Mountain")
- Louisville (named in honor of King Louis XVI in 1778)
- Magnolia
- Marion (named for Francis Marion, a hero of the American Revolution of French Huguenot ancestry)
- Montpelier (for the city in France)
- Paris (for the city in France)
- Richelieu (for Cardinal Richelieu)
- Rousseau (for a local mill owner)
- Toulouse (for the city in France)
- Versailles (for the city in France)

Counties

- Bourbon County (name for House of Bourbon, European Royal House)
- Fayette County (named for Gilbert du Motier, Marquis de La Fayette)
- Gallatin County (named for Albert Gallatin, Swiss American and Secretary of State)
- LaRue County (named for John LaRue, early Kentucky settler)
- Marion County (named for Francis Marion, a hero of the American Revolution of French Huguenot ancestry)

== Louisiana ==
- Louisiana (Louisiane in French – named in honor of King Louis XIV of France in 1682)
- Abbeville (after Abbeville, France) (One of several communities in the United States named "Abbeville".)
- Algiers New Orleans neighborhood
- Ascension Parish, named from the French l'Ascension
- Arnaudville
- Assumption Parish, named from the French l'Assomption
- Audubon New Orleans neighborhood
- Avoyelles Parish
- Baton Rouge ("Red Stick")
- Bayou Cane
- Bayou Chicot
- Bayou Gauche ("Left Bayou")
- Bayou Grande Cheniere Mounds
- Bayou L'Ourse
- Beauregard Parish
- Belle Alliance ("Beautiful Alliance")
- Belle Chasse ("Beautiful Hunting")
- Belle d'Eau
- Belle Rose ("Beautiful Rose")
- Belmont
- Bienville Parish
- Blanchard (named after a Louisiana governor of French ancestry)
- Bonnet Carré, flood prevention spillway on the Mississippi River ("square bonnet")
- Bossier City (after Pierre Bossier)
- Bossier Parish
- Bourg (ancient French word for "town")
- Breaux Bridge
- Breton National Wildlife Refuge (on and around Breton Island)
- Broussard (after merchant Valsin Broussard, of Acadian descent)
- Butte La Rose
- Calcasieu
- Cancienne
- Chalmette ("Pasture land, fallow land")
- Chandeleur Islands
- Charenton (named after Charenton asylum)
- Chataignier ("Chestnut tree")
- Chauvin
- Chenier Au Tigre ("Tiger oak tree")
- Chenal
- Cocodrie (dialect word for "crocodile")
- Cossinade
- Coteau Bourgeois ("Bourgeois hill")
- Davant
- Delacroix Island
- Delcambre
- Des Allemands ("of the Germans")
- Destrehan (named in honor of Jean Noel Destréhan, Creole politician)
- Deville
- Dulac ("of the lake")
- Evangeline Parish
- Faubourg Marigny New Orleans neighborhood
- Faubourg Tremé New Orleans neighborhood
- Fontainebleau New Orleans neighborhood
- Fort De La Boulaye
- Garyville
- Gentilly New Orleans neighborhood
- Grand Bayou ("great bayou")
- Grand Ecaille ("great scale")
- Grand Ecore
- Grand Isle ("great island")
- Grand Chenier ("great oakwood")
- Grand Coteau ("great hill")
- Grosse Isle ("big island")
- Grand Point
- Grand Prairie ("great meadow")
- Grosse Tête ("fat or big head")
- Gueydan
- Iberville Parish (named for Pierre Le Moyne d'Iberville)
- Iberville Projects New Orleans neighborhood
- Jean Lafitte (named for Jean Lafitte, a famous pirate)
- Labadieville
- Lacamp
- Lacassine ("small house")
- LaCour
- Lacombe
- Lafayette (named for the Marquis de Lafayette)
- Lafitte Projects New Orleans neighborhood
- Lafourche Parish (from la fourche, referring to a forked path)
- Lake Borgne ("one-eyed")
- Lake Pontchartrain
- L'Anse Grise ("the gray cove")
- LaPlace (named for early settler Basile LaPlace.)
- Larose ("the rose")
- Lebeau ("the beautiful")
- Le Blanc ("the white")
- Lecompte
- Leonville
- Le Moyen
- Loreauville
- Marchand
- Mandeville (named for developer Bernard Xavier de Marigny de Mandeville)
- Maringouin (Cajun French in origin and means "mosquito")
- Marion (named after an American soldier of Huguenot ancestry)
- Maurepas
- Meaux (after the town of Meaux)
- Meraux
- Mermentau
- Mer Rouge ("red sea")
- Metairie (from a French word for sharecropping)
- Michoud New Orleans neighborhood
- Montegut
- Montpelier
- Moreauville
- Napoleonville (for French Emperor Napoleon)
- New Orleans (named for Philippe II, Duke of Orléans)
- Ossun (named after the town of Ossun)
- Paincourtville ("short of bread town")
- Paradis ("Paradise")
- Parlange
- Pierre Part
- Plaisance
- Plaquemines Parish
- Plaucheville
- Point Au Fer Reef Light
- Pointe aux Chenes ("Oak Point")
- Pointe à la Hache ("Axe Spike")
- Pointe Coupee Parish (from pointe coupée, "cut spike")
- Port Barre
- Port Fourchon
- Pont Des Mouton
- Prairieville ("meadow town")
- Presquille (from presqu'île, "peninsula")
- Provencal
- Rosaryville
- Saint Benedict
- Saint Bernard
- Saint Maurice
- St. Amant
- St. Claude New Orleans neighborhood
- St. Francisville
- St. Gabriel
- St. Landry Parish
- St. Malo
- St. Martinville (originally named Poste des Attakapas-Atakapas Post)
- St. Roch New Orleans neighborhood
- St. Rose
- Saline
- South Vacherie
- Terrebonne Parish ("Good Land")
- Timbalier Island ("timpani player")
- Tulane/Gravier New Orleans neighborhood named after Paul Tulane, philanthropist and son of Louis Tulane, a French immigrant
- Vacherie ("Cowshed")
- Verdun
- Versailles
- Vieux Carré ("Old Square") also known as the French Quarter in New Orleans
- Ville Platte ("Flat City")

== Maine ==
- Maine (one theory suggests the state was named after the historic French province of Maine)
- Cadillac Mountain (named after explorer Antoine de la Mothe Cadillac)
- Calais (after Calais, France)
- Caribou
- Castine (for Jean-Vincent d'Abbadie de Saint-Castin)
- Deblois
- Detroit (named after Detroit, Michigan)
- Fayette (for the Marquis de Lafayette)
- Fort Pentagouet
- Grand Isle
- Isle au Haut
- Lagrange (for the Marquis de Lafayette's home)
- Lamoine (for Andre Le Moyne, a local landowner)
- Minot
- Montville
- Mount Desert Island
- Paris (for the city in France)
- Presque Isle (from the French word "presqu'île" meaning "peninsula"--- from presque meaning "almost", and isle meaning "island". The town is surrounded on three sides by water, and therefore is "almost an island")
- Portage Lake
- Roque Bluffs
- Saint Croix Island
- St. Francis River
- Saint John River
- Tremont

== Maryland ==
- Bel Air ("Good Air")
- Belcamp ("Beautiful Camp")
- Bellevue ("Beautiful View")
- Crapo (from crapaud, 'toad')
- Doubs (for either the départment or the river)
- Dunkirk (for the city in France)
- Havre de Grace (named after Le Havre (originally Le Havre de Grâce, literally "harbor of grace"), France)
- Magnolia
- Parole ("Word of Honor")
- Trappe ("Trap") (Note: Coulet du Gard & Coulet du Gard 1974, p. 100 notes that the town could also have been named from the German word for "step." Although, another explanation is that the town was named for Frenchman Jules Trappe.)

== Massachusetts ==
- Barre
- Belmont
- Marion
- Orleans (named for Louis Philippe II, Duke of Orléans)
- Revere (after Paul Revere, of Huguenot ancestry; his family name originally was Rivoire)
- Savoy

== Michigan ==
- Allouez (named after missionary Claude-Jean Allouez)
- Au Gres (French for "at the sandstone")
- Au Sable
- Au Sable River
- Au Train
- Barbeau
- Beaugrand Township
- Bellaire ("Beautiful Air")
- Belle Isle ("Beautiful Isle")
- Belle River
- Belleville ("Beautiful City;" named for a Paris district)
- Bellevue ("Beautiful View")
- Belmont ("Beautiful Mountain")
- Benzie County "Bec Scie", meaning "Saw Beak" or "Saw Bill", a kind of duck
- Berrien County
- Bete Grise ("Gray Beast")
- Bete Grise (community also meaning "Gray Beast")
- Bois Blanc Island ("White Wood," originally a Native American name)
- Cadillac (named after explorer Antoine de la Mothe Cadillac)
- Calumet (named after the French word for a peace pipe)
- Chapin Township
- Charlevoix (named for Pierre François Xavier de Charlevoix (1682–1761), a French Jesuit in New France)
- Cheviers
- Delaware Township
- De Tour Village ("Turning or Change of Direction")
- Detroit (of the "Strait")
- Doty
- Durand (named for George H. Durand, who was of French descent)
- Eau Claire ("Clear Water")
- Ecorse (from Rivière aux Écorces, "Bark River")
- Epoufette ("Test Tube")
- Fayette (named for the Marquis de Lafayette)
- Fort Gratiot Charter Township
- Fremont Township
- Grand Blanc ("Great/Large White")
- Grand Marais ("Large Marsh")
- Grand Traverse County
- Grandville ("Big City")
- Grande Pointe
- Gratiot County (named for Charles Gratiot, who was of French descent)
- Gros Cap ("Great Elevation")
- Grosse Ile ("Big Island")
- Grosse Pointe ("Big Point")
- Grosse Pointe Farms
- Grosse Pointe Park
- Grosse Pointe Shores
- Grosse Pointe Woods
- Hamtramck (named for the French-Canadian soldier Jean François Hamtramck from Québec, became a decorated officer in the American Revolutionary War)
- Huron (named for the Wendat people, called "Huron" in French)
- Isle Royale National Park ("Royal Island")
- Lac La Belle ("Beautiful Lake", community)
- Lac La Belle ("Beautiful Lake", lake)
- Lachine
- Lamotte Township
- L'Anse ("The Cove")
- Lapeer County (from pierre, meaning "stone")
- Lasalle (named for René-Robert Cavelier, Sieur de La Salle)
- LeRoy ("The King")
- Les Cheneaux Islands ("The Channels")
- Marion Township
- Marlette
- Marne (named after a river in France)
- Marquette (named after explorer Jacques Marquette)
- Marquette County
- Metz (named for the French city)
- Montcalm County (named for Louis-Joseph de Montcalm, French military commander in the French and Indian War).
- Montmorency County (named for the Montmorency family, a noble family influential in the administration of New France)
- Napoleon (for Napoleon Bonaparte)
- Orleans (named for the French city)
- Ozark (from aux arcs, "at the bend")
- Paris (named for the French city)
- Parisville
- Pere Marquette River (for Father (père) Jacques Marquette)
- Pere Marquette Township
- Pointe Aus Barques
- Pointe Aux Chenes ("Oak Point")
- Pointe aux Tremble
- Pointe La Barbe ("Point of the Beard")
- Pointe Mouillee State Game Area
- Portage
- Presque Isle (from presqu'île, "peninsula")
- Presque Isle County
- Reno Township
- River Rouge
- Saint Clair Haven
- Saint Clair Shores
- Saint Louis (named for the city in Missouri)
- Saline
- Sans Souci
- Sault Ste. Marie ("St. Mary's Rapids")
- Sebille Manor
- St. Clair
- St. Clair County
- St. Clair Shores
- St. Ignace (French rendition of St. Ignatius)
- St. Joseph
- Traverse City
- Torch Lake (originally named "Lac du Flambeau")
- Vermilion
- Vermontville

== Minnesota ==
- Argyle (from the French Argile, "clay") (or from Argyll in Scotland?)
- Audubon (named for John James Audubon)
- Baudette (named for Joseph Baudette, a trapper of French-Canadian descent who lived in the area)
- Beaulieu (named for Basille Beaulieu, a trapper of French-Canadian descent who lived in the area)
- Belle Plaine ("Beautiful Plain")
- Belle Prairie Township
- Bernadotte (named after Jean-Baptiste Jules Bernadotte, 19th-century king of Sweden and Norway born in France)
- Big Fork River (originally Rivière Grande Fourche)
- Bois de Sioux River ("woods of the Sioux")
- Bois Forte Indian Reservation ("hard wood")
- Brule River (from the Ojibwe name Wiisakode-ziibi "half-burned wood river", which was translated directly into French as Bois Brulé. Half of the river disappears into a pothole in the Judge C. R. Magney State Park).
- Calumet (named for the French word for peace pipe)
- Cannon River (originally named rivière aux canots, "river of the canoes")
- Cloquet
- Coteau des Prairies ("slope of the prairies")
- Delano (after a scion of the famous Delano Family, originally Huguenots named "De Lannoye")
- Detroit Mountain, thus Detroit Lakes
- Duluth (named after Daniel Greysolon, Sieur du Lhut, French soldier and explorer)
- Faribault, named for Jean-Baptiste Faribault, French-Canadian trader
- Faribault County, named for Jean-Baptiste Faribault, French-Canadian trader
- Fond du Lac Indian Reservation ("source of the lake")
- Frontenac State Park (named after Louis de Buade de Frontenac, governor of New France)
- Frontier ("Border" refers to its position on the Minnesota / Ontario border)
- Gentilly (named after Gentilly, Quebec)
- Glese (From the French "glaise" or clay)
- Grand Marais ("Big Marsh"; some speculate "Big Harbor" in founders' accent)
- Grand Portage ("Large Portage")
- Grand Rapids
- Hennepin County (named in honor of the 17th-century Belgian explorer Father Louis Hennepin)
- Huot, Minnesota (named after French-Canadian settler Louis Huot )
- La Moille – corruption of La Mouette 'the seagull' from a Vermont city name
- La Porte (The Door)
- La Prairie
- Lac qui Parle ("lake that speaks")
- La Crescent
- Lac Vieux Desert ("lake of the old clearing")
- Lafayette (named for the Marquis de Lafayette)
- Lake Pepin (named after French-Canadian settler Jean Pepin)
- Lake Traverse
- Lake of the Woods (originally lac du bois)
- Laporte (for a settler)
- Laprairie ("the prairie")
- La Salle (named after René-Robert Cavelier, Sieur de La Salle, French explorer)
- Le Center (originally "le centre")
- Le Roy (named after Le Roy, New York)
- Le Sueur (named after Pierre-Charles Le Sueur, French fur trader and explorer)
- Leech Lake (originally lac sangsue, "leech lake", a translation from the Ojibwe Ozagaskwaajimekaag-zaaga'igan "Lake abundant with leeches")
- Little Fork River (originally Rivière Petite Fourche)
- Little Marais (originally Petit Marais, "Little Marsh")
- Magnolia
- Marabouf Lake
- Mille Lacs County
- Mille Lacs Lake ("thousand lakes")
- Nicollet County (named after Joseph Nicollet, French mapmaker who led three 18th-century expeditions in present-day Minnesota and the Dakotas)
- Orleans (named after Orléans, France)
- Pelland (named after French-Canadian Joseph Pelland, the town's first postmaster)
- Platte
- Pomme de Terre ("potato")
- Racine ("roots")
- Rainy Lake (originally lac à la pluie, "rainy lake")
- Red Lake (originally lac rouge, "red lake", a translation from the Ojibwe Miskwaagamiiwi-zaaga'igan "Red-colored Waters Lake")
- Renville County, Minnesota (named after Joseph Renville, Métis founder of the Columbia Fur Company)
- Revere (named after Paul Revere, who was of French descent)
- Roseau ("reed")
- Roseville
- St. Cloud (named after Saint-Cloud, France; St. Cloud is Saint Clodoald, grandson of the Frankish king Clovis I)
- St. Croix River
- St. Hilaire
- St. Louis Park
- Saint Louis River (named for Louis IX of France)
- Saint Paul (once known as Pig's Eye Landing after Pierre "Pig's Eye" Parrant – French: l'Oeil du Cochon, a French-Canadian trader and innkeeper, renamed Saint Paul by French-Canadian pastor Lucien Galtier when he built the first Roman Catholic chapel in the area)
- Sedan (named after Sedan, France)
- Terrebonne ("good land")
- Thief River Falls (originally la rivière voleuse, or "stealing river")
- Traverse County
- Vadnais Heights, suburb of Saint Paul
- Vaseux Portage
- Lake Vermilion
- Voyageurs National Park, (named after the French-Canadian explorers – "travellers")

== Mississippi ==
- Abbeville (named after Abbeville, South Carolina, which had been settled by Huguenots and named for Abbeville, France)
- Amite County (from amitié, "friendship")
- Bay St. Louis (from Baie Saint-Louis)
- Bayou Caddy
- Bellefontaine
- Belmont ("Beautiful Mountain")
- Benoit
- Biloxi
- Bourbon (named for the House of Bourbon)
- Carriere
- Centreville (note the "re" spelling in "centre" as opposed to "center")
- Clermont Harbor
- Decatur (named after Stephen Decatur, U.S. navy officer of French descent)
- De Lisle
- D'Iberville (named after Pierre Lemoyne, Sieur d'Iberville, governor of New France)
- Dumas
- Fayette (named for the Marquis de Lafayette)
- Gautier (Named for the Gautier family, who established a homestead on the site in 1867.)
- Lafayette County (named for the Marquis de Lafayette)
- Lafayette Springs (named for the Marquis de Lafayette)
- LeFleur's Bluff State Park (named after earlier French-Canadian trader and settler Louis Lafleur)
- Leflore County (named after Greenwood LeFleur, son of the French-Canadian trader and settler Louis Lafleur)
- Macon (named for Nathaniel Macon, Revolutionary War veteran and United States Senator of Huguenot ancestry)
- Magnolia
- Marion (named after Francis Marion, Revolutionary War officer of Huguenot descent)
- Montpelier (named after the French city)
- Ozark (from aux arcs, "at the bend")
- Paris (for the French city)
- Pass Christian (Named after Nicholas Christian L'Adnier)
- Petit Bois Island ("Little Woods")
- Saucier
- Sartinville
- St. Martin

== Missouri ==
- Audrain County (named after James Hunter Audrain, a Colonel of Militia who served during the War of 1812)
- Auxvasse ("swamp")
- Bay de Charles
- Bayouville
- Beaufort (for the town in South Carolina)
- Belgique (named after Belgium)
- Belle
- Bellefontaine ("beautiful fountain")
- Berger (for a local merchant)
- Bevier (named after Robert Bevier, a Missouri colonel for the Confederate army in the American Civil War)
- Boeuf Creek and Boeuf Township, Franklin County ("beef")
- Bois Brule Creek ("burnt wood")
- Bois D'Arc ("wood of a bow")
- Bonne Terre ("good earth")
- Bourbeuse River ("muddy")
- Bourbon (for the French royal dynasty)
- Brazeau (for a local merchant)
- Cabanne Course (for a local family)
- Calvey Creek (for a local family)
- Cap au Gris ("sandstone")
- Cape Girardeau
- Cape Girardeau County (named after Jean Baptiste de Girardot, a French soldier who established a temporary trading post in the area around 1733)
- Carondelet (named after Francisco Luis Héctor de Carondelet, 18th-century Louisiana governor of partial Burgundian descent)
- Castor River
- Chamois
- Chariton County (for a French trader)
- Chouteau Springs (named for Jean-Pierre Chouteau, New Orleans-born fur trader, merchant, politician, and slaveholder of French descent)
- Cooter (named for the Coutre family)
- Cote Sans Dessein ("hill without purpose")
- Courtois (for a local settler)
- Courtois Creek
- Courtois Hills
- Creve Coeur ("Heartbreak")
- Cuivre River ("copper")
- Dardenne Prairie (for a local family)
- DeBaliviere Place (Neighborhood in St. Louis)
- De Lassus (named for Carlos de Hault de Lassus)
- Des Arc
- Desloge (named after Firmin V. Desloge, industrialist of French descent)
- Des Peres ("Fathers," named after the French Jesuit missionaries who settled there)
- River Des Peres
- Dubois Creek (for a local settler)
- Fabius River (for a local settler)
- Fayette (named after the Marquis de Lafayette)
- Femme Osage
- Florissant (formerly Fleurissant, meaning "blooming")
- Fourche a Renault (named for Philip Renault, owner of the local mine)
- Frontenac (named after Louis de Buade de Frontenac, governor of New France)
- Gallatin (Note: Coulet du Gard & Coulet du Gard 1974, p. 131 gives the source for this name as "an early French settler," but Ramsay 1952, p. 56 argues that this town was named for American politician Albert Gallatin.)
- Gasconade County (named after the Gascony region of France)
- Gratiot Military Prison (for General Charles Gratiot)
- Gravois Mills (for a local settler)
- Isle du Bois Creek ("island of trees")
- Labadie (named for Sylvestre Labadie, a local merchant)
- LaBarque Creek
- La Belle ("the beautiful")
- Laclede and Laclede County (named for Pierre Laclede (1729–1778), the French founder of St. Louis, Missouri)
- Lafayette County (named for Gilbert du Motier, the Marquis de Lafayette)
- La Forge
- La Grange (named for the Marquis de Lafayette's home)
- Lake Lafayette
- Lamine Township ("mine")
- Lampe ("the lamp")
- La Tour
- La Vieille Mine (Alternate name of Old Mines)
- Le Grand Village Sauvage
- Loutre River ("Otter")
- Luray (a corruption of "la reine," or "the queen")
- Lyon
- Macon County (named for Nathaniel Macon, Revolutionary War veteran and United States Senator of Huguenot ancestry)
- Marais Croche
- Marais des Cygnes River ("Swan Marsh")
- Marais des Liards (original name of Bridgeton)
- Marais Temps Clair
- Maries County From "Marais" meaning swamp.
- Marion County (named after Francis Marion, Revolutionary War officer of Huguenot descent)
- Marmaton River ("scullion")
- Maupin (for a local family)
- Mine La Motte (named for Antoine de la Mothe Cadillac, a French governor of the area)
- Metz (named for the Siege of Metz)
- Moniteau County
- Moreau River
- Napoleon (named for the French emperor Napoleon)
- Noel
- Normandy (named after the Normandy region of France)
- Oregon County ("Ouragon" meaning hurricane)
- Ozark County ("Aux Arcs")
- Papin (for a local trader)
- Paris (named after Paris, Kentucky)
- Pere Marquette Park
- Petit Marais Rondeau Lake
- Platte County
- Pomme de Terre Lake ("Potato")
- Pomme de Terre River ("Potato")
- Portage des Sioux
- Portageville
- Prairie du Chien
- Racine ("root")
- Revere (named for Paul Revere)
- River aux Vases
- Robidoux
- Roubidoux Creek
- Rocheport ("roche" for "stone")
- Saline County ("salt")
- St. Aubert
- St. Clair County (named after Arthur St. Clair, first governor of the Northwest Territory)
- St. Cloud
- St. Francois County
- St. Francois Mountains
- St. Joseph (Founded by Joseph Robidoux IV, Missouri-born fur trader of French Canadian descent who named the city after himself)
- St. Louis (named after King Louis IX, later canonized as Saint Louis)
- St. Louis County
- Ste. Genevieve (named after Genevieve, the patron saint of Paris)
- Ste. Genevieve County (named after Genevieve, the patron saint of Paris)
- Sni-A-Bar Creek (corruption of "Chenal Hubert," referring to Antoine Hubert, a local merchant)
- Sni Mills
- Terre du Lac
- Theabeau
- Valles Mines (named after François Vallé, a French-Canadian who established lead mines there in the 18th century)
- Versailles (named after the Palace of Versailles)
- Vichy (named after Vichy, France)

== Montana ==
- Anceney and Anceney Bridge, Montana, named after Charles Leon Ancen(n)ey (Anxionnaz)(1826–1895)
- Belle Creek community (and Belle Creek river)
- Belmont ("beautiful mountain")
- Butte ("small hill")
- Cascade County ("waterfall")
- Choteau, named after Pierre Chouteau, Sr., an American fur trader of French Canadian origin
- Chouteau County, named after Pierre Chouteau, Jr., an American fur trader of French Canadian origin
- Dupuyer (likely from the word "dépouille," referring to the back fat of a bison)
- Froid ("Cold")
- Haugan (named for a local settler)
- Havre (named after Le Havre, France)
- Joliet (named after Joliet, Illinois)
- Laurin (named after Jean-Baptiste Laurin, Frenchman who founded a trading post in the mid-19th century that became the site of the community)
- Lozeau
- Portage
- Prairie County
- St. Marie
- St. Xavier
- Sonnette ("little bell")
- Teton County ("Teat")
- Valier (named for a local settler)
- Valmy (from Valmy, France)
- Virgelle
- Wibaux and Wibaux County (named after Pierre Wibaux, French cattle owner and ranchman in Montana and North Dakota)
- Yellowstone River (originally called the "Roche Jaune," meaning "Yellowstone")

== Nebraska ==
- Barada (named after Antoine Barada, a fur trapper born in Iowa of French and Omaha descent)
- Bayonne (named after Bayonne, France)
- Bellevue ("Beautiful Sight")
- Belvidere
- Bordeaux (named for the creek, below)
- Bordeaux Creek (named for Jim Bordeaux, born in Missouri of French descent, who managed the nearby Bordeaux Trading Post)
- Brule ("burnt")
- Butterfly Creek (originally "La Rivière Papillon")
- Cabanné's Post (named after its operator, Jean Pierre Cabanné, born in St. Louis of French descent)
- Chadron (named after Louis Chartran, a French-Indian fur trapper who ran a nearby trading post)
- Charon (named for a local settler)
- Decatur (named after Stephen Decatur Bross, one of Nebraska's earliest settlers)
- Du Bois ("of the Woods")
- Elkhorn River (originally "Corne-de-Cerf")
- Fontanelle, Fontenelle Forest, Fontenelle Boulevard, Hotel Fontenelle, Logan Fontenelle Housing Project (Named after Logan Fontenelle, Omaha Tribe chief who was the son of a Creole and Omahan mother)
- Fremont (named for John C. Frémont, French-American pioneer and politician)
- Grand Island (after nearby settlement known to French traders as La Grande Isle)
- Lamoille (named for a local settler)
- La Platte
- Lemoyne ("the monk")
- Loup County, Loup City, Loup River ("Wolf", named after the Skidi Pawnee people who called themselves the Wolf People)
- Louisville (named after Louisville, Kentucky)
- Lyons
- Marquette (named after Jacques Marquette)
- Orleans (for the French city)
- Papillion (from papillon, "butterfly")
- Platte County and Platte River ("flat river")
- Robidoux Pass
- Rulo (named for a local settler with the las name "Rouleau")
- Saline County ("salt")
- Sarpy County (named after Peter Sarpy, a fur trader of French descent)
- St. Deroin (named after Joseph Deroin, Métis trader).
- St. Paul
- Shell Creek (originally "la petite coquille")

== Nevada ==
- Currie (named for Pierre and Marie Curie)
- Frenchman
- Frenchman Flat
- Lamoille (after the Lamoille Valley)
- Montreux
- Pioche, named after François Louis Alfred Pioche, a financier who purchased the town in 1869. (Pioche also means "spade" in French).
- Primeaux
- Reno (named after Major General Jesse Lee Reno, a Union officer killed in the American Civil War. Reno's family name was a modified version of the French surname "Renault")
- Valmy, named after the place in France of a famous battle during the Revolutionary period.

== New Hampshire ==
- Belmont (named for August Belmont, German-born financier who changed his name to Belmont upon arriving in the United States)
- Bretton Woods (The term is derived from Brittany, but "this town was probably named for the woods in Shakespeare's Macbeth.")
- Claremont ("clear mountain")
- Fremont (named for John C. Frémont, French-American pioneer and politician)
- Pinardville (named for Edmond Pinard, Québec native and early resident)

== New Jersey ==
- New Jersey and Jersey City (after the Bailliage de Jersey, the largest of the Anglo-Norman Channel Islands near the coast of northwest France)
- Audubon (named for John James Audubon, naturalist of French descent)
- Bayonne (according to tradition, from Bayonne, France)
- Belleplain
- Belleville ("Beautiful town")
- Delair (from de l'air, "some air")
- Dumont ("of the mountain")
- Lafayette (after the Marquis de Lafayette)
- Lavallette (named for Elie A. F. La Vallette, U.S. naval captain of French family origin)
- Lyons (after Lyon)
- Magnolia (after Pierre Magnol by way of the tree)
- Montclair ("Bright Mountain")
- Port Liberté ("Freedom Port")

== New Mexico ==
- Antoine Leroux (named for Antoine Leroux (1801–1861), a famous trader and scout, born from French – Canadian parents, who settled in Taos, New Mexico)
- Bayard and Fort Bayard (named for George Dashiell Bayard, Union general in the Civil War of French ancestry)
- Bosque ("little woods")
- Clovis (named for Clovis, first Christian King of the Franks)
- Des Moines (named for the Iowa city)
- Duran (named for a local settler)
- Lamy (named for Archbishop Jean-Baptiste Lamy)
- Ledoux (named for Abraham Ledoux (1784–1842) and Antoine Ledoux (1779 – ?), two French brothers born in Québec, who became trappers and settled in Mora, New Mexico and Taos, New Mexico)
- Raton ("raccoon")
- St. Vrain (named for Ceran St. Vrain, a Western American trader of French descent)

== New York ==
- Au Sable
- Ausable River ("sand river")
- Barre
- Bellerose
- Belle Terre
- Boquet or Bouquet River
- Buffalo (One theory holds that the city gets its name from an English corruption of the French "beau fleuve" ("beautiful river").)
- Chateaugay (named after Chateauguay, Québec)
- Chateaugay River
- Champlain (named after French explorer Samuel de Champlain)
- Chaumont (named after Jacques-Donatien Le Ray de Chaumont, French governor and "Father of the American Revolution")
- Chaumont Bay
- Chaumont River
- Chazy (named after Lieutenant de Chézy of the Carignan-Salières Regiment)
- Clermont
- Decatur (named after Stephen Decatur, U.S. navy officer of French descent)
- Delaware County
- Dunkirk (named after the city of Dunkirk or Dunkerque, France, because of the similar harbor.)
- Esperance
- Fayette
- Fayetteville (named after the Marquis de Lafayette)
- Fremont
- Fremont Center (named after John C. Frémont, Franco-American explorer, military officer and politician)
- Gouverneur (named after Gouverneur Morris, signer of the U.S. Constitution and former U.S. Senator from New York of Huguenot descent)
- Grand Island
- Granville (named after John Carteret, 2nd Earl Granville, British statesman of Norman descent)
- Grasse River (named after François Joseph Paul de Grasse, a French admiral who decisively defeated the British fleet in the Battle of the Chesapeake in September 1781 during the American Revolution)
- Huguenot
- Jacques Cartier State Park (park located along the St. Lawrence River and named after 16th-century French explorer Jacques Cartier)
- La Chute River
- LaFayette (named after the Marquis de Lafayette)
- LaGrange (Named for the Château de la Grange-Bléneau, the French estate of the Marquis de Lafayette)
- Lake Champlain (lake named after French explorer Samuel de Champlain)
- Le Ray (named after Jacques-Donatien Le Ray de Chaumont, French governor and "Father of the American Revolution")
- Le Roy
- Lorraine (named for the Lorraine region of France)
- Louisville (named after Louis XIV)
- Lyons (named after Lyon, France)
- Maine
- Marion (named after Francis Marion, Revolutionary War officer of Huguenot descent)
- Massena (named after André Masséna, one of Napoleon's field marshals.)
- Montague
- Montour (named after Catherine Montour, Iroquois leader of mixed French descent)
- New Paltz (named by French Huguenots)
- New Rochelle (founded by French Huguenots and named after La Rochelle, France.)
- Orleans
- Orleans County (possibly named in honor of the House of Orléans)
- Portage
- Raquette River
- Rouses Point (named after early settler Jacques Rouse.)
- Point Au Roche State Park (park located on the shores of Lake Champlain)
- St. Armand (named for Saint-Armand, Quebec)
- St. Lawrence County (for the Saint Lawrence River, English form of Fleuve Saint-Laurent.)
- Valcour Island (island located in Lake Champlain)

== North Carolina ==
- Belvoir
- Camp Lejeune US Marine Corps base (Named for John A. Lejeune, 13th Commandant of the Marine Corps, of Acadian descent)
- Charlotte (Named for Charlotte of Mecklenburg-Strelitz)
- Claremont ("clear mountain")
- Encas ("in case")
- Fayetteville (Named for the Marquis de Lafayette)
- Faison (Named for Henry Faison, local physician and cotton farmer of French Huguenot descent)
- Fremont
- La Fayette (Named for the Marquis de Lafayette)
- La Grange (Named for the Château de la Grange-Bléneau, the French estate of the Marquis de Lafayette)
- Lenoir (Named for William Lenoir, Revolutionary War officer of French Huguenot descent)
- Lenoir County
- Macon and Macon County (Named for Nathaniel Macon)
- Magnolia (Named for Pierre Magnol by way of the tree)
- Peletier
- Rougemont (after a town in France)

== North Dakota ==
- Almont
- Amity ("friendliness")
- Belcourt (named for Georges-Antoine Belcourt, French-Canadian Roman Catholic priest who established two missions in present-day North Dakota)
- Bois de Sioux River
- Bordulac ("Edge of the Lake")
- Bottineau (named for Pierre Bottineau, Métis pioneer, hunter, and trapper)
- Butte
- Cavalier (from "chevalier", knight)
- Charbonneau
- Chateau de Mores State Historic Site (home and ranch built in the 1880s by the French cattle baron and nobleman Marquis de Morès)
- Coteau des Prairies ("slope of the prairies")
- Missouri Coteau
- Coulee
- De Lamere ("of the mother")
- Des Lacs River("of the Lakes"), also Des Lacs
- Gascoyne (from the French region "Gascogne")
- Grand Forks (from the French "les Grandes Fourches" or the great forks)
- Granville (named for Granville Dodge, local railroad executive)
- Joliette (named for Joliette, Quebec) (Note: Coulet du Gard & Coulet du Gard 1974, p. 160 suggests that this town was named for explorer Louis Joliet.)
- LaMoure (named for Judson LaMoure, North Dakota legislator born in present-day Quebec)
- Leroy ("the king")
- Loraine (from the French region "Lorraine")
- Medora (named by the French nobleman Marquis de Morès for his wife Medora)
- Merricourt
- Montpelier (named after Montpellier, France)
- Napoleon (named for Napoleon Bonaparte)
- Renville County (named for Joseph Renville, interpreter, guide and founder of the Columbia Fur Company of French-Canadian and Sioux descent)
- Rolette County (named for Joe Rolette, Minnesota territorial legislator of French-Canadian descent)
- Rolette
- Russo Original family named Rousseau
- Souris (French translation of the original Indigenous name meaning "Mouse")
- Verendrye (named for Pierre de La Vérendrye, French-Canadian officer and explorer)
- Voltaire (named for Voltaire, French Enlightenment philosopher)

== Ohio ==
- Auglaize River (corruption of the French eau glaise, meaning "muddy water")
- Auglaize County
- Belfort (named for Belfort, France)
- Bellaire
- Bellefontaine ("Beautiful Spring")
- Bellevue ("Beautiful View")
- Belmont County (Anglicized "Beautiful Mountain")
- Belmont
- Belpre (Shortened from "Belle Prairie," "Beautiful Meadow")
- Champaign County ("Open level country")
- Chardon (named for Peter Chardon Brooks, Massachusetts legislator)
- Clermont County (named for Clermont, France
- Decatur
- Delaware County
- Duchouquet Township (named for Francis Duchouquet, French-Canadian trapper)
- Fayette County (after the Marquis de Lafayette)
- Fayette
- Fremont (named for John C. Frémont, American explorer, military officer and politician of French-Canadian descent)
- Gallia County (Latin for Gaul, Roman name for France)
- Gallipolis, Ohio, largest city of Gallia County
- Girard (named for Stephen Girard, French-born American banker, philanthropist and slave owner)
- Grand Prairie Township
- Guernsey County (named for Isle of Guernsey)
- Huron County (French name for the Wendat tribe)
- Lafayette
- Lagrange (Named for the Château de la Grange-Bléneau, the French estate of the Marquis de Lafayette)
- LaRue (named for William LaRue, town founder)
- Leroy Township, Lake County (named for Le Roy, New York)
- Lorain County (for the French province of Lorraine)
- Lorain
- Louisville
- Marietta (to honor Marie Antoinette)
- Marion County (named after Francis Marion, Revolutionary War officer of Huguenot descent)
- Marne (named after a river in France)
- Marseilles (from the French city of Marseille)
- Martel ("Hammer")
- Massillon (after Jean Baptiste Massillon, French bishop)
- Moraine
- Oregon
- Paris Township, Portage County, Ohio (named for Paris, New York)
- Paris Township, Stark County, Ohio
- Paris Township, Union County, Ohio
- Portage County
- Vermilion River (Red River)
- Versailles (named for Versailles, France)

== Oklahoma ==
- Avant ("Before" or "ahead")
- Ballard (a common French surname)
- Belfonte
- Bellevue ("Beautiful View")
- Boise City (from Boisé, "Wooded")
- Cache ("hiding place")
- Calumet (French term for a peace pipe)
- Chouteau (named for Auguste Pierre Chouteau, fur trader born in Upper Louisiana of French descent)
- Delaware County (after Thomas West, 3rd Baron De La Warr by way of the Native American tribe)
- Durant (The French surname of the town's founding French/Choctaw family)
- El Reno (Named after Civil War officer Jesse L. Reno, of Huguenot descent)
- Guymon
- Lucien (A common French given name)
- Poteau ("Stake," named by French explorers)
- Remy
- Sallisaw (derived from "bayou salaison," meaning "salting provision bayou")
- Sans Bois Mountains ("Without forest")
- Verdigris
- Verdigris River (named by French traders who settled in the area in the late 1700s)

== Oregon ==
- Oregon (possibly from "le fleuve aux ouragans", French for "river of the hurricanes", referring to the windiness of the Columbia River)
- Bellevue
- Bellfountain (named after Bellefontaine, Ohio)
- Bonneville (named after Benjamin Louis Eulalie de Bonneville (1796–1878), a French-born officer in the United States Army, fur trapper, and explorer)
- Butteville
- Charbonneau (named after Jean-Baptiste Charbonneau son of Sacajawea and Toussaint Charbonneau a French-Canadian trapper member of the Lewis & Clark expedition)
- Coquille ("Shell")
- Deschutes County ("of the falls")
- Deschutes River (from rivière des chutes meaning river of the falls)
- Deschutes National Forest (Waterfalls National Forest)
- Detroit ("Strait") (likely named after Detroit, Michigan)
- Gervais (named for Joseph Gervais, French-Canadian pioneer and trapper)
- Grand Ronde ("Big ring")
- Lafayette (named for the Marquis de Lafayette)
- La Grande ("The Big / Great One")
- Langlois (French surname. From "L'Anglais" = the Englishman)
- La Pine ("The Pine")
- Malheur County ("Misfortune")
- Marion County (named for Francis Marion, Revolutionary War officer of Huguenot descent)
- Maupin (named for Howard Maupin, local settler and postmaster)
- Mayger (named for C.W. Mayger, a settler from France)
- Nonpareil ("Unparalleled")
- Pompadour Bluff (named because of its resemblance to the pompadour hairstyle)
- Rainier (named for Peter Rainier, Royal Navy officer of Huguenot descent)
- Ruch ("Hive")
- Saint Louis
- Saint Paul
- Sauvie Island (named for Laurent Sauvé dit Laplante, a French-Canadian who managed a dairy for the Hudson's Bay Company in the 1830s and 1840s)
- Terrebonne ("Good land")
- The Dalles (from les dalles meaning "slabs" or possibly a type of rapids)
- Willamette River (French pronunciation of a Clackamas Indian village name)
- Willamette Valley

== Pennsylvania ==
- Audubon (named for John James Audubon)
- Belle Vernon
- Bellefonte ("Beautiful Fountain")
- Bellevue ("Beautiful View")
- Blanchard (named for Jean-Pierre Blanchard)
- Boquet (named for Henry Bouquet, 18th-century Swiss-born British army officer of the 18th century)
- Bovard (named for a local settler)
- Calumet, Pennsylvania (French term for a peace pipe)
- Charleroi ("Charles King"—in reference to King Carlos II of Spain)
- Chartiers Township (named for Peter Chartier, fur trader of mixed Shawnee and French parentage)
- Clarion County ("clear")
- Conneaut Lake (named for a settler)
- Cresson ("water cress")
- Dauphin County (named for Louis Joseph, Dauphin of France)
- Decatur Township (named for Stephen Decatur, U.S. navy officer of French descent)
- Delano (after a scion of the famous Delano Family, originally Huguenots named "De Lannoye")
- Delmont (corruption of "du mont," "of the mountain")
- Dormont ("mount of gold")
- DuBois ("Of the Woods") (Note: Coulet du Gard & Coulet du Gard 1974, p. 184 suggests that this town was named for a luberman named John DuBois.)
- Dupont (after the Dupont family)
- Dushore (simplification of "du Thouars," the name of a local settler)
- Duquesne (named after Michel-Ange Duquesne de Menneville, governor-general of New France)
- Eau Claire
- Embreeville (named after a local family of Huguenot descent)
- Fayette City (named for Marquis de Lafayette)
- Fayette County (named for Marquis de Lafayette)
- Fayetteville (named for Marquis de Lafayette)
- Fort Duquesne (named for Michel-Ange Duquesne de Menneville, governor-general of New France)
- Fort Le Boeuf
- Fort Machault (named for Jean-Baptiste de Machault d'Arnouville, French Minister of the Marine at the time of the fort's construction)
- Fort Presque Isle
- Girardville (named after Stephen Girard)
- Hulmeville (named after a local family of Norman descent)
- La Belle ("the beautiful")
- Lamartine (named after Alphonse de Lamartine)
- Lanse ("l'anse" means "land")
- Laporte (named for John Laporte, former Speaker of the Pennsylvania House of Representatives)
- Latrobe (named for Benjamin Henry Latrobe)
- Lemont ("the mountain")
- Le Raysville (named for Vincent le Ray de Chaumont)
- Ligonier (named for Field Marshal John Ligonier, a British noble and officer with French ancestry)
- Luzerne County (named for Anne-César de La Luzerne, 18th-century French Minister to the United States)
- Luzerne Township
- Mercer Township
- Montour County (named for Andrew Montour, a prominent Métis interpreter who served with George Washington during the French and Indian War)
- North Versailles Township
- Paris
- Poyntelle (corruption of "pointillé," meaning "dotted")
- Revere (named for Paul Revere)
- Roulette ("little wheel")
- South Versailles Township
- Versailles, named after the Palace of Versailles
- Wilkes-Barre (named after Isaac Barré, English soldier and politician of Huguenot descent)

== Rhode Island ==
- Bernon, a neighborhood in Woonsocket, RI (named for a local settler)
- Lafayette Village, a historic district in North Kingstown, RI (named for the Marquis de Lafayette)
- Marieville, a neighborhood in Providence, RI

== South Carolina ==
- Abbeville (from Abbeville, France)
- Abbeville County, South Carolina
- Baton Rouge ("red stick")
- Beaufort (named for the Duke of Beaufort)
- Belair ("good air")
- Bonneau (named for Floride Bonneau Calhoun, wife of U.S. politician John C. Calhoun)
- Bordeaux (from Bordeaux, France)
- Chapin (named for a local Huguenot family)
- Cordesville (named for a local settler)
- DeBordieu
- Eau Claire ("Clear Water")
- Fort Motte (named for Rebecca Brewton Motte, a plantation owner)
- Gaston (A common French given name)
- Gourdin (named for a local settler)
- La France (named for a company)
- Luray (named for the town in Virginia)
- Marietta (named for Marie Antoinette)
- Marion County (named for Francis Marion)
- Montmorenci (named for a local family)
- Mount Croghan (named for a French officer who fought in the American Revolution)
- Pacolet
- Port Royal Sound
- Ravenel
- Rembert (named for a local family)
- Sans Souci ("No Worries", the French name of chateau of Frederick the Great, famously Francophile)
- Turbeville
- Vaucluse (from the Vaucluse, France)
- Waterloo (after the Belgian town)

== South Dakota ==
- Belle Fourche ("Beautiful Fork")
- Belle Fourche Reservoir
- Belle Fourche River
- Belvidere ("beautiful overlook")
- Big Sioux River
- Bois de Sioux River ("Woods of the Sioux" River)
- Bon Homme County ("Good Man" County)
- Burdette
- Claire City ("clear")
- Claremont ("clear mountain")
- Conde (named for the Princes of Condé)
- Corsica
- Coteau des Prairies ("Slope of the Prairies")
- Missouri Coteau ("Slope of the Missouri")
- Delmont ("the mountain")
- De Smet (named for Pierre-Jean De Smet, a Belgian priest)
- Dupree (named for Fred Dupris, a pioneer settler)
- East Sioux Falls, a ghost town
- Edgemont
- Flandreau (named for Charles Eugene Flandrau, judge of Huguenot ancestry)
- Fort Pierre
- Huron (named for the Native American tribe)
- Jerauld County
- Joubert (a common French surname)
- Lake Traverse
- La Bolt (named for a local settler)
- La Plant
- LeBeau
- Mellette County (named for Arthur C. Mellette, the first governor of the State of South Dakota)
- Montrose (possibly from "pink mountain")
- Moreau River
- North Sioux City
- Pierpont
- Pierre (named for Pierre Chouteau, Jr., a St. Louis-born fur trader of French descent) (Note: Coulet du Gard & Coulet du Gard 1974, p. 203 suggests that this city was named for Pierre Gaultier de Varennes, sieur de La Vérendrye.)
- Platte
- Roubaix (a ghost town whose name was chosen in honor of Roubaix, France, the hometown of Pierre Wibaux, an investor in a local mine)
- Roubaix Lake, a lake located in the Black Hills (from the French city of Roubaix)
- Sioux Falls
- Vermillion, South Dakota
- West Branch Lac qui Parle River ("Lake that Speaks" River)
- White River ("la rivière blanche")

== Tennessee ==
- Bellevue ("beautiful view")
- Belvidere ("beautiful outlook")
- Decatur
- Decatur County (named for Stephen Decatur, U.S. navy officer of French descent)
- Decaturville
- Fayette County (named for the Marquis de Lafayette)
- Gallatin (named for Swiss-born Albert Gallatin, U.S. Secretary of the Treasury)
- Lafayette (named for the Marquis de Lafayette)
- La Follette (named for Harvey Marion LaFollette, town founder of Huguenot ancestry)
- La Grange (named for the home of the Marquis de Lafayette)
- La Vergne
- Lenoir City (named for William Lenoir, Revolutionary War general of Huguenot ancestry, and his son)
- Luray (likely a corruption of "la reine," "the queen")
- Macon
- Macon County (named for Nathaniel Macon, Revolutionary War veteran and United States Senator of Huguenot ancestry)
- Marion County
- Paris (named for the French city)
- Reverie ("dream")
- Sevier County
- Sevierville (named for John Sevier, Tennessee governor of Huguenot ancestry)

== Texas ==
- Austin-named for Stephen F. Austin, whose surname is of Norman French origin.
- Bayou Vista
- Bellevue ("beautiful view")
- Belmont ("beautiful mountain")
- Biloxi
- Blanchard
- Burnet County (named after early Texas leader David Gouverneur Burnet)
- Castroville (founded by Henri Castro, a French diplomat)
- Clairemont ("clear mountain")
- Colmesnil
- Crockett County (Davy Crockett's ancestors were Huguenots named Croquetagne, one of whom was captain in the Royal Guard of Louis XIV)
- Dallardsville
- DeBerry
- Decatur (named after Stephen Decatur, U.S. navy officer of French descent)
- Detroit ("strait")
- Doucette
- Dumas, named after its founder Louis Dumas
- Dumont
- Duval County (named after Burr H. Duval, a soldier in the Texas Revolution who died in the Goliad Massacre
- Fayette County and Fayetteville (named after the Marquis de Lafayette)
- Gary City
- Girard (named for Stephen Girard, a French-born banker)
- Grand Prairie
- LaBelle
- La Grange (Named for the Château de la Grange-Bléneau, the French estate of the Marquis de Lafayette)
- La Marque
- La Porte ("The Door")
- La Salle County and La Salle (named after explorer René-Robert Cavelier, Sieur de La Salle)
- Lamar County (named after early Texas leader Mirabeau Buonaparte Lamar, of Huguenot descent)
- Magnolia (named after the tree, which gets its name from botanist Pierre Magnol)
- Marion County (named after Francis Marion, Revolutionary War officer of Huguenot descent)
- Mauriceville
- Menard
- Menard County (named after Michel Branamour Menard, French-Canadian trader and merchant)
- Mont Belvieu
- Montague County (named after Daniel Montague, surveyor and soldier in the Mexican–American War)
- Paris (named after the French city)
- Sabine Lake ("cypress")

== Utah ==
- Ballard
- Bonneville Salt Flats (named after Benjamin Louis Eulalie de Bonneville (1796–1878), a French-born officer in the United States Army, fur trapper and explorer)
- Cache County (named for the fur stashes, caches, made by many of the Rocky Mountain Fur Company trappers in the area
- Cache Junction
- Corinne
- Duchesne
- Duchesne County
- Fayette (named for Fayette, New York, where the LDS church was founded)
- Fort Duchesne
- Grand County
- Henrieville (named for a settler)
- Lapoint ("the point")
- Portage (named after Portage County, Ohio)
- Provo (named after Étienne Provost, French-Canadian fur trader)
- Sevier County

== Vermont ==
- Vermont (probably translated from "Green Mountain" in the 1770s)
- Barre (named after Isaac Barré, English soldier and politician of Huguenot descent)
- Belmont (origin unknown) (Note: Coulet du Gard & Coulet du Gard 1974, p. 211 suggest that this town was named for August Belmont.)
- Calais (named for Calais, France)
- Grand Isle County ("big island")
- Isle La Motte (named after a French soldier, Pierre La Motte in 1666)
- Lake Champlain (named by Samuel de Champlain in 1662)
- Lamoille (possibly named by French settlers as La Mouette)
- Montpelier (named after Montpellier, France)
- Orleans County and Orleans (named after Orléans, France)
- Vergennes (named for Frenchman Charles Gravier, comte de Vergennes, who aided the rebels in the American Revolutionary War)

== Virginia ==
- Amissville
- Barboursville (named for James Barbour, 18th governor of Virginia)
- Basye
- Bavon
- Belmont
- Belle Isle State Park
- Belvoir
- Bertrand (A common French given name)
- Boissevain
- Bon Air
- Botetourt County (named for Norborne Berkeley, 4th Baron Botetourt)
- Capron
- Caret
- Cedon
- Champlain
- Chantilly (named after Chantilly, France)
- Clary
- Claudville (A common French given name)
- Claremont ("clear mountain")
- Crozet (named for Claudius Crozet, French-born civil engineer who directed the construction of the Blue Ridge Tunnel)
- Delaplane
- Fauquier County (named for Francis Fauquier, 18th-century lieutenant governor of Virginia of Huguenot descent)
- Fort Belvoir ("see well")
- Fremont (named for John C. Frémont, pioneer and politician of French-Canadian descent)
- La Crosse
- Lafayette (named for the Marquis de Lafayette)
- Lagrange
- Luray (named after Luray, a village in Normandy)
- Macon
- Manquin
- Mauzy
- Montpelier (named after Montpellier, France)
- Orlean
- Paris (named after the French city)
- Renan (named for Ernest Renan, French philosopher and theologian)
- Richmond, from "riche mont", a name given first to the castle founded in North Yorkshire by a Breton family, and from there to Richmond near London
- Rochelle
- Sabot
- Turbeville

== Washington ==
- Beaux Arts Village (from "fine arts")
- Bellevue ("Beautiful View")
- Belfair
- Belmont ("Beautiful Mountain")
- Blanchard (Old French for "Whitish")
- Boistfort
- Bonneville Dam (named for Benjamin Bonneville, an explorer of French descent)
- Brier
- Coulee City
- Coupeville (named for the founder of the city)
- Decatur Island
- Deschutes ("of the Falls")
- Des Moines ("of the Monks")
- Doty
- Dupont (likely for the Dupont family)
- Duvall
- Esperance ("Hope")
- Fauntleroy (Old French for "Child of the King")
- Guerrier ("Warrior")
- Grand Coulee (from coulée or couler, meaning "to flow")
- La Center
- La Crosse
- La Grande
- Lamont
- La Push (Clallam County, along the Quileute River on the Olympic Peninsula. Home to the Quileute Indian Tribe. From la bouche, meaning "mouth", as infused into Chinook trading jargon)
- Laurier (Named after Sil Wilfrid Laurier, Canadian Prime Minister)
- Loup Loup (from loup, "wolf")
- Malo
- Maury Island
- Monte Cristo (named for The Count of Monte Cristo, a novel by French author Alexandre Dumas)
- Mount Rainier (named after Captain Peter Rainier, grandson of the Huguenot refugee Daniel Regnier)
- Normandy (named after Normandy, France)
- North Bonneville (named after Benjamin Louis Eulalie de Bonneville (1796–1878), a French-born officer in the United States Army, fur trapper, and explorer)
- Ozette
- Palouse (from pelouse, meaning "lawn") (Note: This is disputed; Palús is the name of the aboriginal people who lived at the mouth of the river and the name has been connected to a group of rocks at the same area. French fur traders referred to the river as pavillon (flag).)
- Pend Oreille County (named after the Pend d'Oreilles tribe. French for "earring" and a reference to heavy earrings and distended lobes of the people of the same name)
- Pomeroy (Old French for "Apple Orchard")
- Portage
- Portage Island
- Puget Sound named after Peter Puget, an officer in the Royal Navy of Huguenot descent
- Quimper Peninsula
- Roche Harbor
- Touchet
- Touchet River
- Vashon
- Vashon Island named after James Vashon, an officer in the Royal Navy of Huguenot descent

== West Virginia ==
- Bayard (named after Thomas F. Bayard Jr., U.S. senator from Delaware of Huguenot descent)
- Belle
- Belleville ("beautiful town")
- Belmont ("beautiful mountain")
- Chevaux De Frise (cheval de frise)
- Despard
- Fayette
- Fayette County (named after the Marquis de Lafayette)
- Fayetteville (named after the Marquis de Lafayette)
- Ganotown (named after a settle, Jean Gerneaux)
- Granville
- Guyandotte River (a river in southern West Virginia, running from Wyoming County near Beckley, to the Ohio River near Huntington. Guyandotte is the French spelling of the name of an Indian tribe also known as the Wyandot.)
- Lapearville (named for a settler)
- Lavalette (named for Jean Parisot de Valette)
- Le Roy ("the king")
- Lesage (named for a settler)
- Letart (named for James Le Tort)
- Lobelia (named for a settler)
- Marion County (named after Francis Marion, Revolutionary War officer of Huguenot descent)
- Montcalm (named for Louis-Joseph de Montcalm, French military commander in the French and Indian War).
- Nemours (named after the city in France)
- Piedmont
- Racine (named for Jean Racine)
- Ramage ("floral design")
- Revere (named for Paul Revere)
- Ronceverte (Name is derived from two words meaning "Greenbrier.")
- Vaucluse (named for the region in France)
- Verdunville (named after the city in France)

== Wisconsin ==
- Wisconsin (anglicized from the French "Ouisconsin", which in turn is a corruption of the Ojibwe "Meskonsing")
- Allouez (named after Claude-Jean Allouez, French-born missionary and explorer)
- Apple River (corruption of the French Rivière Pomme de Terre des Cygnes, which in turn is a translation from the Ojibwe Waabiziipinikaani-ziibi, "River abundant with swan potatoes")
- Argonne (from the Forest of Argonne in France)
- Ballou
- Belle Plaine ("beautiful plain")
- Bellevue ("beautiful view")
- Belmont ("beautiful mountain")
- Benoit
- Bois Brule River ("burnt wood")
- Brule (named for the Brulé Sioux, whose historic English name comes from the French word for "burnt")
- Butte des Morts ("hill of the dead")
- Calumet County (French for Menominee peace pipe)
- Cassel (a town in France)
- Couderay (from lac courte oreilles, "short ears")
- Dell Prairie
- De Pere (from les rapides des pères, "the rapids of the fathers" after Jesuit mission at the location)
- Dovre
- Durand (French surname)
- Eau Claire ("clear water")
- Eau Claire County
- Eau Galle (from "Rivière aux Galets," "Gravel River")
- Eau Pleine ("full water")
- Flambeau ("torch")
- Fond du Lac ("bottom of the lake")
- Fond du Lac County
- Grand Chute ("great fall")
- Juneau County (Named for Solomon Juneau, French-Canadian fur trader and a founder of Milwaukee)
- La Crosse (Named for the Native American game with sticks played there)
- La Crosse County
- La Farge (likely named for a settler)
- Lafayette County (Named for the Marquis de Lafayette)
- La Grange
- La Pointe (from la pointe de Chequamegon, the area around Chequamegon Bay)
- La Valle ("the valley")
- Lac Courte Oreilles ("lake short ears")
- Lac du Flambeau ("lake of the torch")
- Lac La Belle ("Lake the beautiful or beautiful lake")
- Lake Butte des Morts ("hill of the dead")
- Langlade County (Named for Charles Michel de Langlade, fur trader of mixed French-Canadian/Ottawa descent)
- Lyons (named for Lyon)
- Marinette County
- Marquette (after Father Jacques Marquette)
- Marquette County
- Montreal ("Royal Mountain", after Montréal, Québec)
- Nicolet National Forest (named after Jean Nicolet, first European to set foot in present-day Wisconsin)
- Pepin County (named for Pepin the Short)
- Portage (originally named for the Fox-Wisconsin portage)
- Portage County
- Poynette (Originally named "Paquette," for Pierre Paquette, the current name derives from a clerical error).
- Prairie du Chien ("dog prairie")
- Prairie du Sac ("prairie of the Sac people")
- Presque Isle (from presqu'île, "peninsula")
- Racine ("root", after the Root River)
- Racine County
- Radisson (named for Pierre-Esprit Radisson, early French-Canadian explorer)
- Roche a Cri
- St. Croix Falls (after the St. Croix ("Holy Cross") river, named c. 1689)
- St. Croix County
- Superior (from Lake Superior / Lac Supérieur – meaning "upper" in this context)
- Theresa (named for Thérèse Galarneau Juneau, the mother of Solomon Juneau, French-Canadian fur trader and a founder of Milwaukee)
- Trempealeau River (from "trempe à l'eau", "plunge into the water")
- Trempealeau County
- Waterloo (named for the battlefield in Belgium)

== Wyoming ==
- Belle Fourche River ("beautiful fork")
- Blazon (named for a blazon on a coat of arms)
- Bondurant
- Bordaux (named for a settler)
- Bonneville (named for Benjamin Bonneville)
- Cheyenne (from the French pronunciation and spelling of the Dakota word Sahi'yena, a diminutive of Sahi'ya, a Dakotan name for the Cree people.)
- Cheyenne River
- Dubois (named after U.S. Senator Fred Dubois, of French-Canadian ancestry)
- Fontenelle (named for a settler)
- Fort Laramie
- Fremont County (named for John C. Frémont, French-American pioneer and politician)
- Grand Teton National Park (from French grands tétons, "large teats" – presumably referring to the mountains' shape)
- Gros Ventre Range ("big stomach")
- Gros Ventre River
- La Barge (named for Joseph Marie LaBarge, Senior, French-Canadian fur trapper and trader)
- La Bonte (named for a settler)
- La Grange (named for the home of the Marquis de Lafayette)
- Laramie (named from Jacques LaRamie, French-Canadian trapper who disappeared in the Laramie Mountains in the late 1810s)
- Laramie County
- Laramie Mountains
- Laramie River
- Little Laramie River, as well as the North, South, and Middle Fork Laramie Rivers
- North Laramie River
- North Platte River ("flat")
- Platte County
- Ranchettes
- Sublette County (named for William Sublette, American frontiersman of French descent)
- Teton County
- Teton Range
- Teton Village

== U.S. Virgin Islands ==
- Saint Croix ("Holy Cross")

== See also ==
- List of U.S. state name etymologies
- Lists of U.S. county name etymologies
- List of place names of German origin in the United States
- List of U.S. place names of Spanish origin
- List of Chinook Jargon placenames
- List of non-US places that have a US place named after them

== Bibliography ==
- Branner, John C. (February 1899). "Some Old French Place Names in the State of Arkansas" (PDF). Modern Language Notes. xiv (2). Baltimore, Maryland: Johns Hopkins University Press: 35. doi:10.2307/2917686. JSTOR 2917686.
- Bright, William (2004). Colorado Place Names (3rd ed.). Boulder, Colo.: Johnson Printing Company. ISBN 1555663338.
- HalliBurton, W. H. (1903). A Topographical Description and History of Arkansas County, Arkansas, from 1541 to 1875. p. 47. hdl:2027/wu.89072963770. OCLC 5815561 – via HathiTrust.
- Callary, Edward (2008). Place Names of Illinois. Urbana: University of Illinois Press. ISBN 9780252033568.
- Coulet du Gard, René; Coulet du Gard, Dominique (1974). The Handbook of French Place Names in the U.S.A. Chicago: Adams Press.
- Foscue, Virginia O. (1989). Place Names in Alabama. Tuscaloosa: University of Alabama Press. ISBN 081730410X.
- Gudde, Erwin Gustav (1998). California Place Names (4th ed.). Berkeley: University of California Press. ISBN 0520213165.
- Morris, Allen (1995). Florida Place Names. Sarasota, Fla.: Pineapple Press. ISBN 1561640840.
- Powell, William S.; Hill, Michael (2010). The North Carolina Gazetteer: A Dictionary of Tar Heel Places and Their History (2nd ed.). Chapel Hill: University of North Carolina Press. ISBN 9780807833995.
- Ramsay, Robert L (1952). Our Storehouse of Missouri Place Names. University of Missouri.
- Rennick, Robert (1984). Kentucky Place Names. Lexington: University of Kentucky Press. ISBN 0813115035.
- Savage, Tom (2007). A Dictionary of Iowa Place Names. Iowa City: University of Iowa Press. ISBN 9781587295317.
