= Hurricane Hilda =

Category 4 Atlantic hurricane in 1964

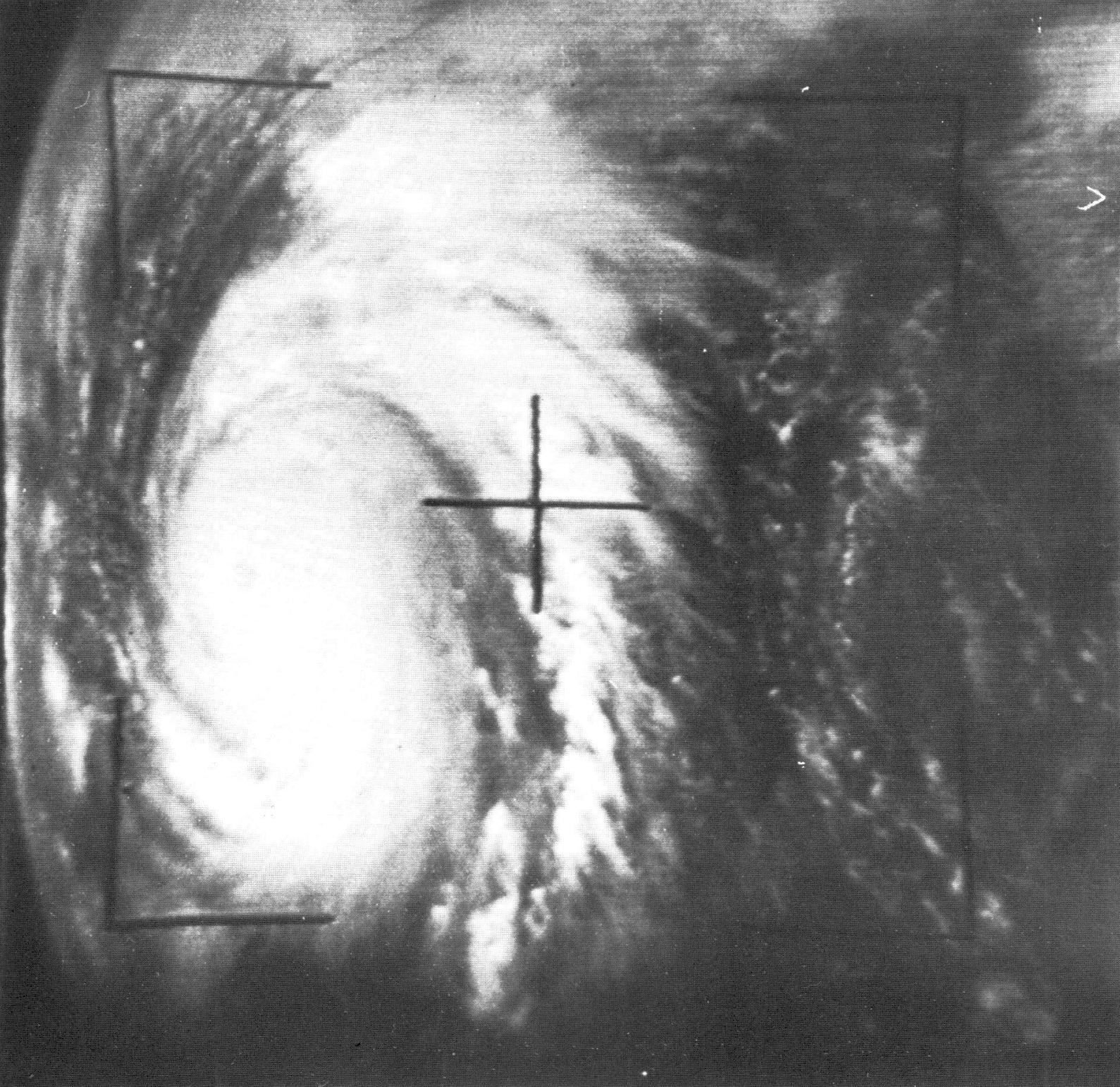
- Hilda at peak intensity on October 1

Meteorological history
- Formed: September 28, 1964
- Extratropical: October 4, 1964
- Dissipated: October 5, 1964

Category 4 major hurricane
- 1-minute sustained (SSHWS/NWS)
- Highest winds: 140 mph (220 km/h)
- Lowest pressure: 941 mbar (hPa); 27.79 inHg

Overall effects
- Fatalities: 38
- Damage: $126 million (1964 USD)
- Areas affected: Cuba; Yucatán Peninsula; United States Gulf Coast; United States East Coast
- IBTrACS
- Part of the 1964 Atlantic hurricane season

Hurricane Hilda was a powerful tropical cyclone that ravaged areas of the United States Gulf Coast, particularly Louisiana. In addition to its damage inland, the hurricane greatly disrupted offshore oil production, and at its time was the costliest tropical cyclone for Louisiana's offshore oil production. Due in part to flights made by the National Hurricane Research Laboratory, Hilda became one of the most well-documented storms meteorologically in the Atlantic. Lasting for seven days as a tropical cyclone, Hilda caused US$126 million in damage and 38 deaths. (Note: All damage totals are in 1964 United States dollars unless otherwise noted.) It was the tenth named storm, sixth hurricane, and the fourth major hurricane of the 1964 Atlantic hurricane season.

Hilda developed over the southern shores of Cuba on September 28 as a tropical depression, tracking westward in an area of favorable conditions and reaching tropical storm intensity the next day. Once situated in the Gulf of Mexico, Hilda strengthened into a hurricane and began a slow trawl northward, rapidly intensifying to its peak intensity with winds of 140 mph (220 km/h) on October 1, making it a Category 4 hurricane. Slight weakening occurred as Hilda made landfall on the southern Louisiana coast on October 3. After reaching land, the hurricane took a sharp turn eastward and rapidly weakened as a result of land interaction and the presence of cool, dry air. The weakened remnants of Hilda merged with a cold front a day after landfall and dissipated on October 5.

Originating near Cuba, the cyclone intensified while moving through the Gulf of Mexico, and became a Category 4 hurricane in the Gulf of Mexico before striking Louisiana in early October. In combination with a frontal zone located across the Southeast United States, the hurricane spread heavy rains through the South through the Carolinas into the Mid-Atlantic States. Hilda led to significant damage to oil platforms in the Gulf of Mexico, as well as $126 million (1964 USD) in damage, and 38 deaths.

== Meteorological history ==
Map plotting the storm's track and intensity, according to the Saffir–Simpson scale Map key Saffir–Simpson scale Tropical depression (≤38 mph, ≤62 km/h) Tropical storm (39–73 mph, 63–118 km/h) Category 1 (74–95 mph, 119–153 km/h) Category 2 (96–110 mph, 154–177 km/h) Category 3 (111–129 mph, 178–208 km/h) Category 4 (130–156 mph, 209–251 km/h) Category 5 (≥157 mph, ≥252 km/h) Unknown Storm type Tropical cyclone Subtropical cyclone Extratropical cyclone, remnant low, tropical disturbance, or monsoon depression

The origins of Hilda can be definitively traced back to a tropical wave that trekked across the western Caribbean Sea during the last week of September. However, a loosely defined mass of clouds east of the Lesser Antilles on September 23 was potentially associated with the formation of Hilda. Tracking westward, the area of convection gradually intensified, with hints at a well-defined circulation as the system tracked over Haiti on September 27. By 1200 UTC on September 28, the disturbance had become sufficiently defined to be classified as a tropical depression south of Cuba. Tracking generally westward, the depression crossed Cape San Antonio, Cuba on September 29, intensifying to tropical storm strength in the meanwhile before moving into the northern Yucatán Channel. Favorable conditions for tropical cyclone development in the western Caribbean, including the presence of abnormally high sea surface temperatures, allowed for the further strengthening of Hilda.

Hilda's crossing of western Cuba slightly disrupted the intensification of the tropical cyclone, but strengthening resumed shortly thereafter. Upon reaching the Gulf of Mexico later of September 29, Hilda began to track very slowly at an average speed of 9 mph (14 km/h), later meeting the threshold of hurricane intensity at 1200 UTC on September 30. During that time, atmospheric conditions over the Gulf of Mexico rapidly improved; a preexisting belt of strong wind shear, which would have inhibited further cyclonic strengthening, disintegrated coincident with Hilda's passage of the gulf. Rapid intensification ensued on October 1, and by 0600 UTC that day Hilda became a major hurricane. (Note: A major hurricane is a storm that ranks as Category 3 or higher on the Saffir–Simpson hurricane scale.) Twelve hours later, the hurricane reached its peak intensity with maximum sustained winds of 140 mph (220 km/h) and a minimum barometric pressure of 941 mbar (27.8 inHg) based on reconnaissance flights. During this phase the storm was centered roughly 350 mi (560 km) south of New Orleans, Louisiana. Around the same time, an abnormally strong trough centered over Mississippi began to sharply curve the forward motion of Hilda towards the north.

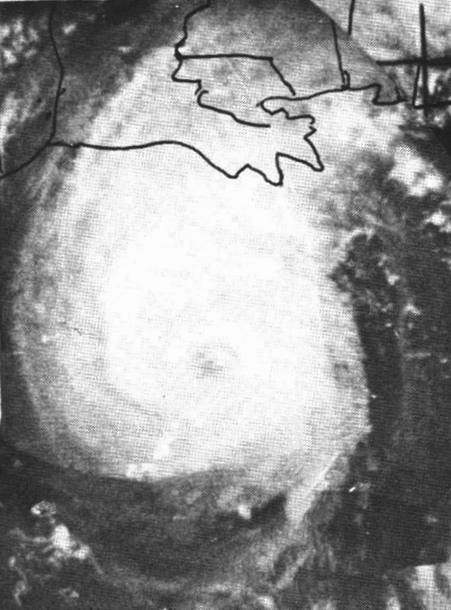
TIROS VIII image of Hilda near Louisiana on October 2

Following peak intensity, further strengthening was inhibited due to the emergence of a high pressure area over the United States Gulf Coast. The presence of this system injected dry air into Hilda, gradually weakening the hurricane. The once prominent eye of the storm clouded over as a result of this advection. During the evening hours of October 3, around 23:00 UTC, Hilda made landfall on the central Louisiana coast near Calumet with a minimum pressure of 959 mbar (28.3 inHg) and maximum sustained winds of 105 mph (169 km/h), making a Category 2 hurricane on the modern-day Saffir–Simpson hurricane wind scale. Rapid weakening followed landfall as a result of the surrounding cold air; by 0600 UTC on October 4, Hilda had been downgraded to tropical storm intensity. The same area of high pressure which had weakened the tropical cyclone later forced Hilda eastward, resulting in the storm's merging with a cold front and thus transitioning into an extratropical cyclone later that day. These extratropical remnants continued to track eastward before they were last noted north of The Bahamas on October 7.

== Preparations ==
The first hurricane watches or warnings issued by the Weather Bureau in association with Hilda were issued on October 1, when the agency issued a hurricane watch for the coast of Louisiana to Mobile, Alabama. This prompted the Texas Department of Public Safety to issue a standby alert for the Texas coast. On October 3, the Weather Bureau upgraded the watch to a hurricane warning, and expanded it to include the entire Texas Coastal Bend eastward to Mobile, Alabama. As Hilda neared the coast, the scope of the warning was narrowed to include only areas of the Louisiana Gulf Coast eastward to Mobile, Alabama and a gale warning for an extent of the United States Gulf Coast from Mobile Bay to Panama City, Florida. By the afternoon of October 4, hurricane warnings were lowered but gale warnings remained in place.

Evacuation of offshore oil platforms began as early as September 29. The majority of the 2,000 oil workers were evacuated on September 30 and October 1. Along the United States Gulf Coast, approximately 150,000 people evacuated. The U.S. Office of Civil Defense and three companies of the Louisiana National Guard were assigned to areas of the coast expedite the evacuation process. Areas lining Lake Pontchartrain were almost entirely evacuated. Re-purposed boxcars were used to move 3,400 evacuees northward from New Orleans and Franklin, Louisiana. A mandatory evacuation order was placed for a 23 mi (37 km) section of the coast of St. Mary Parish, Louisiana, with shuttle buses assisting in evacuating refugees to Opelousas, Louisiana. The United States Red Cross transported 10,000 cots to evacuation centers in Opelousas to serve the evacuees. Morgan City and Cameron, Louisiana were sites of mass exodus with Hilda approaching the coast. Evacuation out of Cameron was disrupted by the lack of a bridge across the Intracoastal Waterway, and thus had to be conducted via ferry. Heads of cattle were among those evacuating from Cameron Parish in fears of a repeat of Hurricane Audrey, which had killed 35,000 cattle. Similarly, all residents of Pecan Island, Louisiana were evacuated. In Grand Isle, Louisiana, approximately 80% of the population evacuated.

Though not directly at threat from Hilda, residents of Sabine Pass, Texas were evacuated to nearby towns in fears that roads linking the city to the mainland may be cut off by the hurricane's storm surge. A permanent off-shore drilling platform 30 mi (48 km) offshore of Galveston, Texas was brought back to shore. Schools along the coast of Louisiana including Nicholls State University and Tulane were suspended in anticipation of the hurricane. In Jackson, Mississippi, a federal disaster office was opened to coordinate preparation and relief efforts for Mississippi. The United States Atomic Energy Commission delayed a detonation of a nuclear bomb in the Tatum Salt Dome near Hattiesburg. The United States Navy scrammed planes from its air stations in Meridian, Mississippi and New Orleans, Louisiana in anticipation of Hilda.

== Effects ==
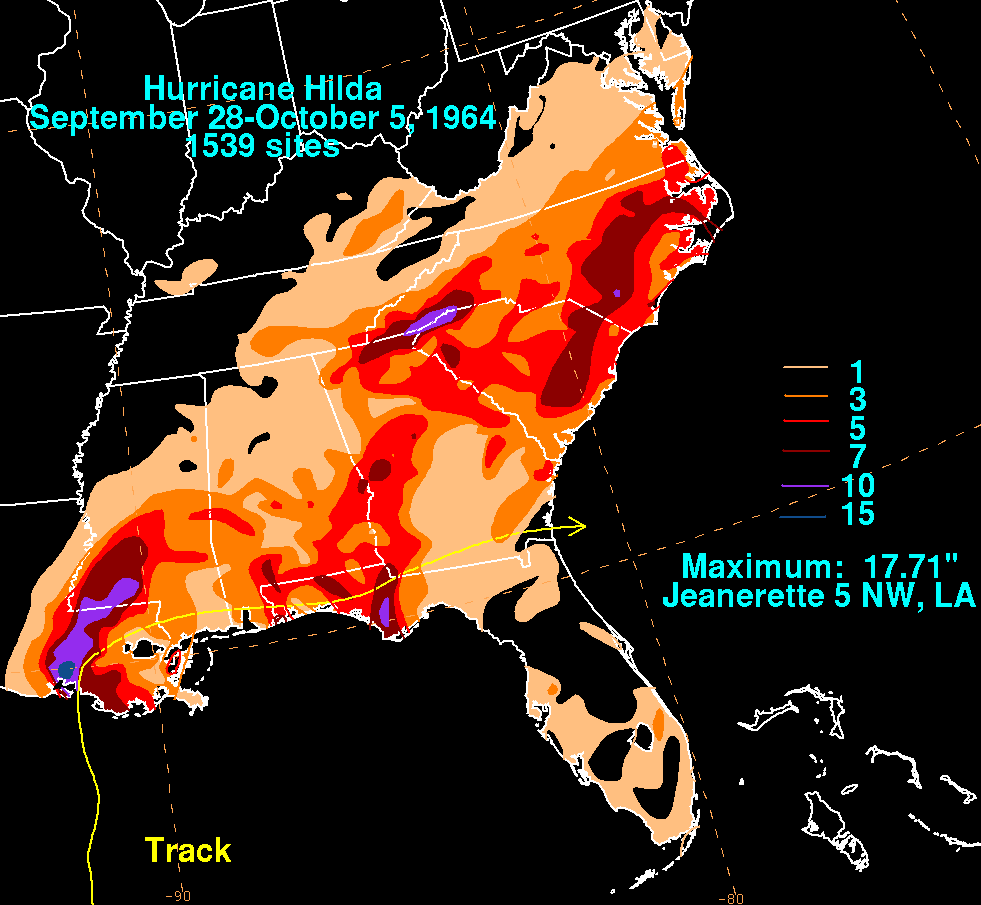
Rainfall totals from Hilda in the United States

=== Gulf of Mexico ===
The motor ship Cornelia B III, carrying a truck on deck, encountered Hilda's rough surf and winds as it traversed the Gulf of Mexico, resulting in the truck being washed overboard. As Hilda tracked northward through the Gulf of Mexico, the storm threatened an estimated $350 million worth of offshore oil drilling facilities. Hilda would become the most destructive tropical cyclone to Louisiana's offshore oil industry at the time of its impact, accruing losses over $100 million. Strong winds and heavy surf destroyed thirteen oil platforms and damaged five beyond repair. All but one of the lost oil rigs were built to withstand a "25-year storm", with the other constructed to withstand a "100-year storm". Oil spills resulting from the affected rigs released 11,869 barrels of crude oil into the gulf. Despite widespread evacuation of offshore drilling platforms, the 14 crewmembers of the Ocean Driller managed to ride out the storm, at times withstanding winds as high as 120 mph (190 km/h).

=== United States ===
==== Louisiana ====
The majority of deaths associated with Hilda in Louisiana were a result of tornadoes spawned by the hurricane in its outer peripheral rainbands and squall lines, which began tracking across the region on October 3. Six tornadoes and two waterspouts occurred in Louisiana due to the hurricane. Despite tracking for only 1–1.5 mi (1.6–2.4 km) near Larose, Louisiana, a violent F4 tornado killed 22 people and injured 165 others, destroying 35 homes in the process. Automobiles in the path of the twister were also damaged. Debris picked up by the tornado was found 16 mi (26 km) away in the Coteau-Bayou Blue area, or 3 miles east of Houma. This was the second of only two violent tornado ever spawned by a hurricane with the first one coming from Hurricane Carla in 1961. Multiple twisters in the New Orleans metropolitan area caused extensive damage to several automobiles and buildings and injured five. The same tornadoes also knocked down power lines, knocking out power in localized areas. KLEB was knocked off the air as a result of these outages.

Data from the hardest hit areas along the central Louisiana coast remains sparse due to the small population density of the area. Storm surge unofficially peaked at 10 ft (3.0 m) at the Point Au Fer Reef Light. At the mouth of the Mississippi River, tides reached as high as 6 ft (1.8 m) above mean sea level. The strongest wind report was from Franklin, Louisiana, where a station clocked sustained winds of 120 mph (190 km/h). Near the coast in Erath, a 125 ft (38 m) high water tower succumbed to Hilda's strong winds and collapsed onto an adjacent town hall where civil defense personnel were operating. The incident resulted in the deaths of eight and six injuries. Although there were no stations to report the intensity of winds in Erath, winds 6 mi (9.7 km) away in Abbeville reached 110 mph (175 km/h). Hilda's sharp curve eastward after landfall and the advection of cold air from the north resulted in gusty winds over the New Orleans area, causing waves to break and spill over the seawall protecting the city from Lake Pontchartrain. The resulting waterfront flooding damaged fishing camps and other shoreline property. Elsewhere in southeastern Louisiana, strong winds stripped pecans and other nuts off of trees.

Despite Hilda's intensity at landfall, much of the damage attributed to the hurricane was a result of heavy rains associated with the storm and its interaction with a nearby frontal boundary. Rainfall caused by the storm peaked at 17.71 in (450 mm) northwest of Jeanerette. The strong winds and rain caused extensive crop damage; 98% of Louisiana's sugar crop sustained some measure of damage. Although most of the state's cotton crop was harvested prior to Hilda's landfall, the heavy rains flattened unpicked cotton in southern Louisiana, resulting in US$10 million in damage. Overall, the effects of Hilda in Louisiana destroyed or heavily damaged nearly 2,600 residences and inflicted minor damage on an additional 19,000. The United States Red Cross estimated that about 5,000 people were injured and that of those 357 were hospitalized.

==== Elsewhere ====
Rainfall maxima by U.S. state
State	Maxima	Location	Notes
Louisiana	17.71 in (450 mm)	NW of Jeanerette	
Georgia	12.73 in (323 mm)	S of Waynesboro	
Mississippi	12.57 in (319 mm)	McComb-Pike County Airport	
South Carolina	12.02 in (305 mm)	Caesars Head	
North Carolina	11.66 in (296 mm)	Lake Toxaway	
Alabama	8.91 in (226 mm)	NNW of Phenix City	
Tennessee	6.12 in (155 mm)	Copperhill	
Virginia	5.48 in (139 mm)	Diamond Springs	
Maryland	2.86 in (73 mm)	Crisfield and SW of Leonardtown	
Delaware	1.64 in (42 mm)	Dover	

Effects in Texas were minimal, with gusts peaking at 45 mph (72 km/h) near High Island, Texas and areas of the state receiving trace amounts of precipitation at most. Damage was limited to the portions of the coast which were hit by a minor storm surge peaking at 3.9 ft (1.2 m) above mean sea level at Freeport. Some piers and arterial beach roads adjacent to the coast were damaged. Portions of Texas State Highway 87 on the Bolivar Peninsula were inundated by floodwater. Minor property damage occurred, and no persons were injured in Texas. Tracking across the southern areas of Mississippi, Hilda and later its remnants brought torrential rainfall to central and southern portions of the state. The McComb-Pike County Airport received 12.57 in (319 mm) of rain, the highest precipitation total statewide. The heavy rains resulted in record rainfall totals for the month of October in several locations and flash floods. However, the majority of damage in the state was a result of strong northerly winds, which caused power outages and was destructive to the state's pecan and corn crops, which had been nearing harvest. Cotton crops that were harvested prior to the passage of Hilda were largely damaged. Power outages knocked out 460 telephone circuits and over 30,000 individual telephones. Strong winds also uprooted and felled trees and their limbs in addition to as well as a 200 ft (61 m) tall radio mast near Moss Point, Mississippi. As a result of Hilda, 20 people were injured and damage exceeded $50,000. Three of those injuries were a result of a tornado which struck areas of Pearl River County, destroying a home, two barns, and a pumping station. Across Mississippi, over 14,000 homes were damaged, of which 3,000 were either heavily damaged or completely destroyed.

Interacting with a cold front as it traversed Alabama, the remnants of Hilda caused gusts as strong as 80 mph (130 km/h) in Mobile and Baldwin counties, downing telecommunication lines, uprooting trees, and shattering windows. Piers lining Mobile Bay were either destroyed or damaged. Five people were injured in those two counties. Strong winds in Russell and Lee counties damaged or destroyed several buildings, injuring four. In addition to straight-line winds, three tornadoes occurred across six counties in Alabama, with one injuring three people after damaging five homes, a hospital, and a plant. Although rainfall peaked well inland at 8.91 in (226 mm), damage as a result of rain was limited to the coast, where the combination of high tides and rain resulted in minor coastal inundation. As the remnants of Hilda moved across the Florida Panhandle on October 4–5, rough surf was produced, with high tides causing minor tidal inundation along the Florida coast. One person drowned in the high surf produced by the storm off of Pensacola, Florida on October 4. Squalls in western and northern Florida produced heavy rain, with a maximum occurring in Wewahitchka, which received 12.42 in (315 mm). The precipitation produced localized flooding in the Tallahassee area. The squalls also produced strong winds, at times gusting to 60 mph (97 km/h) near Pensacola. A station at Naval Air Station Pensacola clocked a 59 mph (95 km/h) gust. These winds caused minor damage limited to uprooted trees and broken limbs.

Rainfall from the remnants of Hilda extended as far northeast as Delaware as a result of the remnants interacting with a frontal boundary that extended across the United States East Coast. Extremely torrential rains fell over Georgia, peaking at 12.73 in (323 mm) south of Waynesboro. The largest precipitation totals occurred in the state's northeastern extremities, where widespread totals of 8 in (200 mm) or higher were reported. The rains resulted in flash flooding, causing extensive damage to roads and other infrastructure across Georgia. The excess floodwater caused streams to overflow their banks. At least 30 bridges were washed away by these swollen streams, and several county roads were washed out. The most considerable damage was reported in northeastern Georgia, coincident with the high rainfall totals there. Damage in Rabun County alone exceeded US$100,000. In addition to infrastructure damage, thousands of acres of farmland were inundated.

Torrential rainfall continued northeastwards into the Carolinas, with statewide rainfall peaking at 11.66 in (296 mm) and 12.02 in (305 mm) in North and South Carolina, respectively. The rains in North Carolina exacerbated preexisting flood conditions which had previously caused widespread agricultural and infrastructural damage as well as soil erosion. Though not directly a result of Hilda's remnants, they were likely influenced by the storm's interaction with a frontal boundary. Already overflowing rivers and streams rose even further, reaching near-record levels. Raleigh experienced severe flooding, and roughly 4,000 people were forced to evacuate their homes due to dangerous floodwaters. Two cars in mountainous regions were swept into inundated areas during the floods, resulting in one death. Several tornadoes in six counties were also reported, injuring two. Extensive wind damage was reported in Wayne County.

Heavy rains in South Carolina from October 4–6 resulted in localized flash flooding, particularly near streams. In mountainous regions, runoff from precipitation caused the Keowee, Saluda, and tributaries of the Broad River to swell, inundated and causing substantial damage to adjacent agricultural land and roads, in addition to breaching several small dams. The flooding triggered landslides, killing one person. Counties in the coastal plains of South Carolina also experienced farmland, road, and residential damage due to the heavy rains.

==== Tornado outbreak ====
Confirmed tornadoes by Fujita rating
FU	F0	F1	F2	F3	F4	F5	Total
0	0	4	7	0	1	0	12

The most notable tornado of the outbreak occurred on October 3 at 6.30 a.m. CST in Larose, Louisiana. Touching down near Bayou Lafourche, the tornado had a 1.5 miles (2.4 kilometres) track to the west. It was designated as an F4 tornado on the Fujita scale, becoming the strongest hurricane-generated tornado ever recorded. The tornado killed 22 people, with 165 injuries. Damage totaled to $2.5 million. About 450 evacuees fled to Larose because of the hurricane. When the tornado neared Louisiana Highway 1, it destroyed cars and houses. Most of the tornado's deaths were due to enclosure in people's homes as the houses collapsed. Citizens recall the house "exploding in the air". Windows broke in several houses, and one house floated above utility lines. Debris went as far as Coteau Bourgeois, which was 16 mi (26 km) away from Larose. After the tornado, citizens helped rescue operations, digging soil to try to find other residents, and helping them go inside ambulances. The event appeared in the October 16, 1964, edition of Life Magazine. It also caused a chapel to be built by one of the affected citizens.

===== October 3 event =====
Confirmed tornadoes – Saturday, October 3, 1964 (Note: All dates are based on the local time zone where the tornado touched down; however, all times are in Coordinated Universal Time and dates are split at midnight CST/CDT for consistency.) (Note: Prior to 1994, only the average widths of tornado paths were officially listed.)
F#	Location	County / Parish	State	Start coord.	Time (UTC)	Path length	Max. width	Summary
F1	Golden Meadow	Lafourche	LA	29.37°N 90.23°W	11:45–?	0.5 miles (0.80 km)	33 yards (30 m)	A brief tornado downed utility wires and damaged several structures. Losses were at least $500.
F1	Galliano	Lafourche	LA	29.43°N 90.28°W	12:00–?	0.5 miles (0.80 km)	33 yards (30 m)	A short-lived tornado affected up to 10 homes and a funeral parlor. Several of the homes shifted on their CBS foundations or were overturned. Some boats were sunk and power lines downed as well. Losses were at least $5,000. Some minor injuries may have occurred.
F4	Northern Larose	Lafourche	LA	29.60°N 90.37°W	12:30–?	1.5 miles (2.4 km)	67 yards (61 m)	22 deaths
F2	New Orleans to Kenner	Orleans, Jefferson	LA	29.93°N 90.22°W	15:00–15:20	14.2 miles (22.9 km)	83 yards (76 m)	This possible tornado family initially damaged automobiles and structures in the French Quarter of New Orleans. It then skipped to the intersection of the Veterans Highway and the Causeway, damaging gasoline stations and nearby buildings. Several vehicles, including a truck, were overturned or thrown into the air. Broken glass injured three people in Jefferson Parish and losses there were at least $500,000. Two other injuries and at least $500,000 in losses occurred in Orleans Parish. At Kenner the tornado badly damaged 17 homes, several of which were unroofed. The NCEI indicates that the tornado developed north-northwest of Waggaman and ended near Seabrook.
F2	Oakley to Attakapas Canal	Assumption	LA	29.92°N 91.10°W	17:10–17:15	1.5 miles (2.4 km)	100 yards (91 m)	This tornado tracked generally westward. It passed near Napoleonville, felling several trees. Homes and other structures shifted on their foundations or were unroofed. Losses were at least $5,000.
F2	White Sand to W of West Poplarville	Pearl River	MS	30.80°N 89.65°W	21:20–?	3.3 miles (5.3 km)	33 yards (30 m)	This strong tornado destroyed a pumphouse, a pair of barns, and a small house. Losses were unknown.

===== October 4 event =====
Confirmed tornadoes – Sunday, October 4, 1964
F#	Location	County / Parish	State	Start coord.	Time (UTC)	Path length	Max. width	Summary
F2	WNW of Lewisburg	St. Tammany	LA	30.38°N 90.13°W	09:25–?	1 mile (1.6 km)	183 yards (167 m)	This tornado destroyed or damaged six lightweight homes. Debris was strewn over a 5-mile (8.0 km) area. Losses were at least $5,000.
F1	N of Flat Rock	Conecuh	AL	31.50°N 86.83°W	15:15–?	0.1 miles (0.16 km)	33 yards (30 m)	A tornado damaged several outbuildings and a few houses. Losses were at least $500.
F1	Northwestern Georgiana	Butler	AL	31.63°N 86.77°W	16:20–?	3.3 miles (5.3 km)	100 yards (91 m)	A tornado unroofed, destroyed, or otherwise damaged 19 houses, many barns, and a fertilizer plant. Numerous trees were downed as well. Losses were at least $5,000. Tornado researcher Thomas P. Grazulis classified the tornado as an F2.
F2	NW of Williamston to SE of Alligator	Martin, Washington, Tyrrell	NC	35.87°N 77.07°W	20:30–21:30	54.1 miles (87.1 km)	50 yards (46 m)	A possible tornado family severely damaged or destroyed outbuildings and five homes. It also moved heavy machinery for an unknown distance. Losses were at least $50,000. The publication Storm Data lists one injury.
F2	Western Eufaula	Barbour	AL	31.80°N 85.20°W	21:00–?	0.1 miles (0.16 km)	33 yards (30 m)	A tornado affected buildings along Pump Station Road in Eufaula. It destroyed or damaged two houses, a factory, and a hospital. Three people were injured and losses were at least $2500.
F2	NE of Cedar Grove to N of Penderlea	Columbus, Bladen, Pender	NC	34.30°N 78.90°W	23:15–01:00	54.6 miles (87.9 km)	50 yards (46 m)	This possible tornado family destroyed or damaged a trailer home, tobacco barns, various outbuildings, a few warehouses, and five homes. Losses were at least $50,000. The publication Storm Data lists one injury.

== Retirement ==
After the season, the Weather Bureau retired the name Hilda from future use in the Atlantic basin. It was replaced with Hannah for the 1968 season.

== See also ==
- List of Category 4 Atlantic hurricanes
- Hurricane Betsy (1965) – was the first Atlantic tropical cyclone to accrue over US$1 billion in damage; devastated portions of Louisiana, particularly New Orleans, less than one year later
- Hurricane Carmen (1974) – resulted in tidal flooding along the U.S. Gulf Coast and greatly damaged Louisiana's sugar cane crop
- Hurricane Georges (1998) – took a very similar track eastwards across the Gulf States after making landfall near New Orleans
- Hurricane Lili (2002) – caused severe damage to Louisiana's southern barrier islands and disrupted oil production in the Gulf of Mexico
