= KMCB =

KMCB may refer to:

- KMCB (TV), a television station (channel 22) licensed to serve Coos Bay, Oregon, United States
- McComb-Pike County Airport (ICAO code KMCB)
