= Villemont Township =

Township in Jefferson County, Arkansas

Coordinates: 34°08′N 91°32′W

Villemont Township, officially the Township of Villemont, is a township in Jefferson County, in the U.S. state of Arkansas. It is named for Carlos de Villemont, a 19th-century landowner. Its population was 55 as of the 2020 census.

== See also ==
- List of place names of French origin in the United States
- List of places in the United States named after people
