= Fremont Township, Michigan =

Fremont Township is the name of some places in the U.S. state of Michigan:

- Fremont Township, Isabella County, Michigan
- Fremont Township, Saginaw County, Michigan
- Fremont Township, Sanilac County, Michigan
- Fremont Township, Tuscola County, Michigan

== See also ==
- Fremont, Michigan, city in Newaygo County
