= Pompadour Bluff =

Summit in Oregon, USA

Coordinates: 42°12′03″N 122°38′45″W

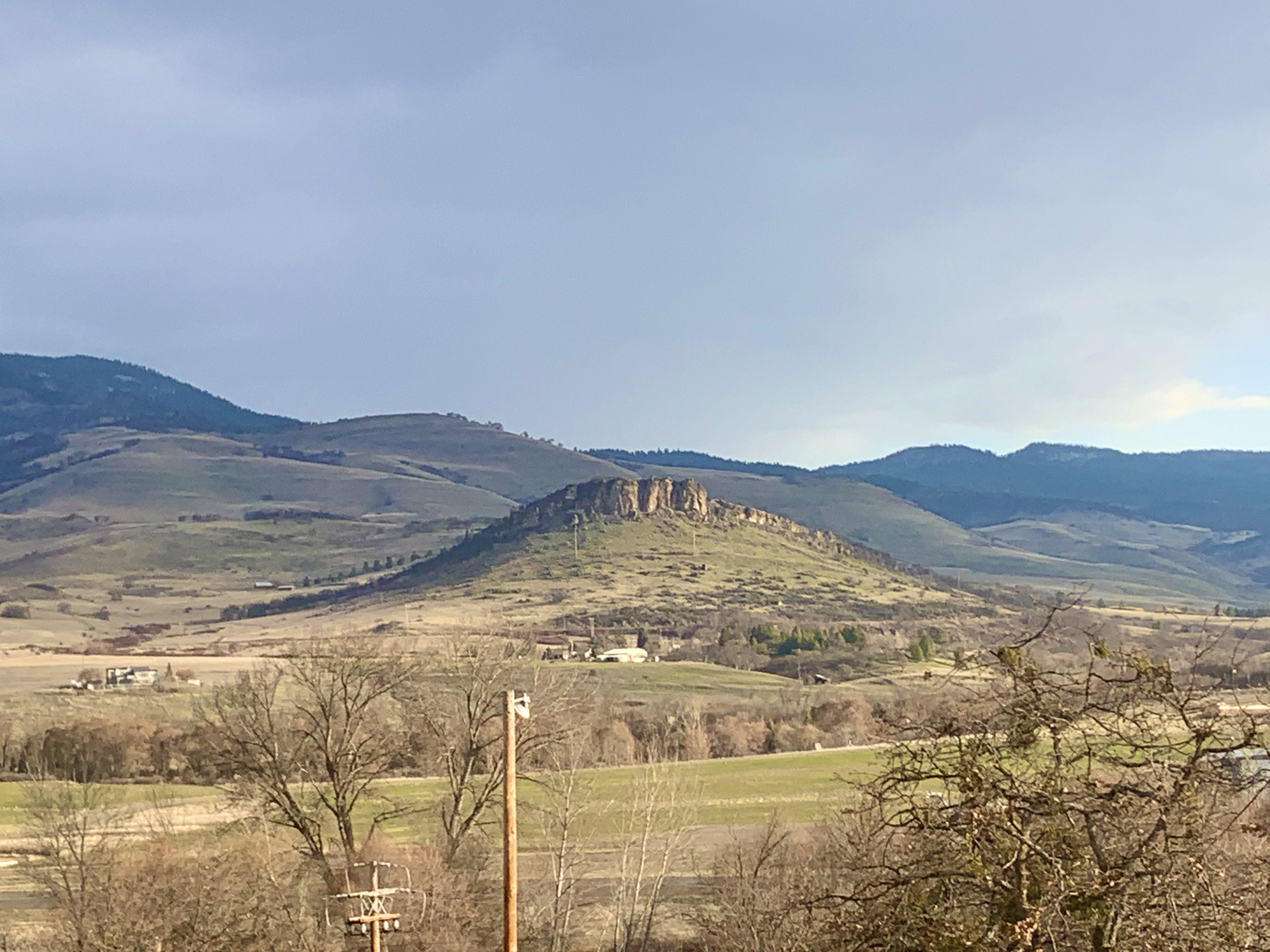
Pompadour Bluff

Pompadour Bluff is a summit in the U.S. state of Oregon. The elevation is 2,306 feet (703 m).

Pompadour Bluff was so named for a fancied resemblance to the pompadour hairstyle.
