= Grand Bayou, Louisiana =

Grand Bayou is the name of multiple places in the U.S. state of Louisiana:

- Grand Bayou, Plaquemines Parish, Louisiana, an unincorporated Native American community in southeast Louisiana
- Grand Bayou, Red River Parish, Louisiana, an unincorporated community in north Louisiana
- Grand Bayou, Assumption Parish, Louisiana, in central Louisiana
