= South Vacherie, Louisiana =

South Vacherie
- Census-designated place
- Location of South Vacherie in Louisiana
- Coordinates: 29°56′12″N 90°41′39″W
- Country: United States
- State: Louisiana
- Parish: St. James

Area
  - Total: 5.15 sq mi (13.34 km^{2})
  - Land: 5.08 sq mi (13.16 km^{2})
  - Water: 0.069 sq mi (0.18 km^{2})
- Elevation: 0 ft (0 m)

Population (2020)
  - Total: 3,388
  - Density: 666.6/sq mi (257.38/km^{2})
- Time zone: UTC-6 (CST)
  - Summer (DST): UTC-5 (CDT)
- Area code: 985
- FIPS code: 22-72092

South Vacherie is a census-designated place (CDP) in St. James Parish, Louisiana, United States. As of the 2020 census, South Vacherie had a population of 3,388. In French, the name defines a cattle range for grazing.

== Geography ==
South Vacherie, is located at 29°56′12″N 90°41′39″W (29.936670, -90.694230).

According to the United States Census Bureau, the CDP has a total area of 15.5 square miles (40.2 km^{2}), all land.

South Vacherie is known more popularly among locals as "Back Vacherie." Officially, both North Vacherie and South Vacherie are known overall as "Vacherie." North Vacherie is locally known as "Front Vacherie." The "unofficial" divider is Louisiana Highway 3127 which runs through the town from east to west. Another divider that is commonly accepted for the dividing line of Front Vacherie and Back Vacherie is St Patrick's St which runs east to west approximately 1 1/8 miles south of LA Hwy. 3127.

== Demographics ==
Historical population
Census	Pop.	Note	%±
1990	3,462		—
2000	3,543		2.3%
2010	3,642		2.8%
2020	3,388		−7.0%
U.S. Decennial Census; 1950 1960 1970 1980; 1990 2000 2010

South Vacherie first appeared as a census designated place the 1990 U.S. census.

South Vacherie CDP, Louisiana – Racial and ethnic composition Note: the US Census treats Hispanic/Latino as an ethnic category. This table excludes Latinos from the racial categories and assigns them to a separate category. Hispanics/Latinos may be of any race.
Race / Ethnicity (NH = Non-Hispanic)	Pop 2000	Pop 2010	Pop 2020	% 2000	% 2010	% 2020
White alone (NH)	2,406	2,328	2,150	67.91%	63.92%	63.46%
Black or African American alone (NH)	1,117	1,240	1,093	31.53%	34.05%	32.26%
Native American or Alaska Native alone (NH)	0	2	6	0.00%	0.05%	0.18%
Asian alone (NH)	1	0	1	0.03%	0.00%	0.03%
Native Hawaiian or Pacific Islander alone (NH)	0	0	0	0.00%	0.00%	0.00%
Other race alone (NH)	1	3	7	0.03%	0.08%	0.21%
Mixed race or Multiracial (NH)	9	21	72	0.25%	0.58%	2.13%
Hispanic or Latino (any race)	9	48	59	0.25%	1.32%	1.74%
Total	3,543	3,642	3,388	100.00%	100.00%	100.00%

As of the census of 2000, there were 3,543 people, 1,233 households, and 976 families residing in the CDP. The population density was 228.1 inhabitants per square mile (88.1/km^{2}). There were 1,312 housing units at an average density of 84.5 per square mile (32.6/km^{2}). The racial makeup of the CDP was 67.94% White, 31.64% African American, 0.03% Asian, 0.14% from other races, and 0.25% from two or more races. Hispanic or Latino of any race were 0.25% of the population.

There were 1,233 households, out of which 38.2% had children under the age of 18 living with them, 63.5% were married couples living together, 11.5% had a female householder with no husband present, and 20.8% were non-families. 18.3% of all households were made up of individuals, and 8.8% had someone living alone who was 65 years of age or older. The average household size was 2.87 and the average family size was 3.28.

In the CDP, the population was spread out, with 26.6% under the age of 18, 10.1% from 18 to 24, 30.7% from 25 to 44, 21.6% from 45 to 64, and 11.0% who were 65 years of age or older. The median age was 36 years. For every 100 females, there were 94.8 males. For every 100 females age 18 and over, there were 93.7 males.

The median income for a household in the CDP was $41,490, and the median income for a family was $53,053. Males had a median income of $37,857 versus $21,724 for females. The per capita income for the CDP was $17,241. About 11.8% of families and 14.3% of the population were below the poverty line, including 18.0% of those under age 18 and 14.6% of those age 65 or over.

== Education ==
St. James Parish Public Schools operates public schools. St. James High School is located in Vacherie. Vacherie Elementary School in South Vacherie serves the community.
