= Lamartine, Pennsylvania =

Unincorporated community in Pennsylvania, US

- Unincorporated community
- Location within Pennsylvania
- Coordinates: 41°13′21″N 79°38′02″W
- Country: United States
- State: Pennsylvania
- County: Clarion
- Elevation: 1,434 ft (437 m)
- Time zone: UTC-5 (Eastern (EST))
  - Summer (DST): UTC-4 (EDT)
- ZIP code: 16375
- Area code: 814
- GNIS feature ID: 1178817

Lamartine is an unincorporated community in Clarion County, Pennsylvania, United States. The community is located along Pennsylvania Route 208, 5.2 miles (8.4 km) east of Knox. Lamartine has a post office with ZIP code 16375.
