= Belle Fontaine, Alabama =

Belle Fontaine, Alabama may refer to the following places in Alabama:

- Belle Fontaine, Baldwin County, Alabama
- Belle Fontaine, Mobile County, Alabama
