= Sicard Flat, California =

Unincorporated community in California, United States

Sicard Flat
- Unincorporated community
- Location in California Sicard Flat (the United States)
- Coordinates: 39°13′52″N 121°20′46″W
- Country: United States
- State: California
- County: Yuba
- Elevation: 348 ft (106 m)

Sicard Flat is an unincorporated community in Yuba County, California, United States. It is located 3 miles (4.8 km) west-northwest of Smartville, at an elevation of 348 feet (106 m). The name honors Theodore Sicard, miner and merchant, who settled here in 1848.
