= Rousseau, Kentucky =

Unincorporated community in Kentucky, United States

- Unincorporated community
- Location within Kentucky
- Coordinates: 37°35′35″N 83°13′47″W
- Country: United States
- State: Kentucky
- County: Breathitt
- Elevation: 778 ft (237 m)
- Time zone: UTC-5 (Eastern (EST))
  - Summer (DST): UTC-4 (EDT)
- ZIP code: 41366
- Area code: 606
- GNIS feature ID: 508980

Rousseau is an unincorporated community in Breathitt County, Kentucky. Rousseau is located on Kentucky Route 30, 8.9 miles (14.3 km) east-northeast of Jackson. Rousseau had a post office until it closed on January 3, 2004; it still has its own ZIP code, 41366.

A post office called Rousseau was established in 1882. The community has the name of a mill owner.
