= Marion Township, Michigan =

Marion Township is the name of some places in the U.S. state of Michigan:

- Marion Township, Charlevoix County, Michigan
- Marion Township, Livingston County, Michigan
- Marion Township, Osceola County, Michigan
- Marion Township, Saginaw County, Michigan
- Marion Township, Sanilac County, Michigan

== See also ==
- Marion, Michigan, a village in Osceola County
- Marion Township (disambiguation)
