= Coteau Bourgeois, Louisiana =

Unincorporated community in Louisiana

- Unincorporated community
- Location within Louisiana Location within the United States
- Coordinates: 30°15′38″N 90°45′29″W
- Country: United States
- State: Louisiana
- Parish: Livingston
- Elevation: 7 ft (2.1 m)
- Time zone: UTC-6 (Central (CST))
  - Summer (DST): UTC-5 (CDT)
- ZIP code: 70449
- Area code: 225
- GNIS feature ID: 534149
- FIPS code: 22-17720

Coteau Bourgeois is an unincorporated community in Livingston Parish, Louisiana, United States. The community is located 5 miles (8.0 kilometres) southeast of French Settlement and 8 miles (13 kilometres) west of Sorrento. The site is on Louisiana Highway 22 and is one mile south of Head of Island on the Amite River.

== Etymology ==
In the French language the word Coteau means Hill and Bourgeois was the name for a wealthy class of French citizens in the late 18th century.
