= McComb–Pike County Airport =

McComb–Pike County Airport John E. Lewis Field
- IATA: MCB; ICAO: KMCB; FAA LID: MCB

Summary
- Airport type: Public
- Owner: City of McComb & Pike County
- Serves: McComb, Mississippi
- Elevation AMSL: 413 ft / 126 m
- Coordinates: 31°10′42″N 090°28′19″W
- Interactive map of McComb–Pike County Airport

Runways
Direction	Length		Surface
Direction	ft	m	Surface
16/34	5,000	1,524	Asphalt

Statistics (2023)
- Aircraft operations (year ending 4/28/2023): 10,320
- Based aircraft: 15
- Source: Federal Aviation Administration

McComb–Pike County Airport (IATA: MCB, ICAO: KMCB, FAA LID: MCB), also known as John E. Lewis Field, is a public airport located four miles (6 km) south of the central business district of McComb, a city in Pike County, Mississippi, United States. It is owned by the City of McComb and Pike County.

== Facilities and aircraft ==
McComb–Pike County Airport covers an area of 430 acres (170 ha) which contains one runway designated 16/34 with a 5,000 x 100 ft (1,524 x 30 m) asphalt pavement. For the 12-month period ending April 28, 2023, the airport had 10,320 aircraft operations, an average of 28 per day: 95% general aviation and 5% military. At that time there were 15 aircraft based at this airport: 13 single-engine, 1 multi-engine and 1 helicopter.

== See also ==
- List of airports in Mississippi
