= Cornwallis in North America =

British Army officer in the American War of Independence

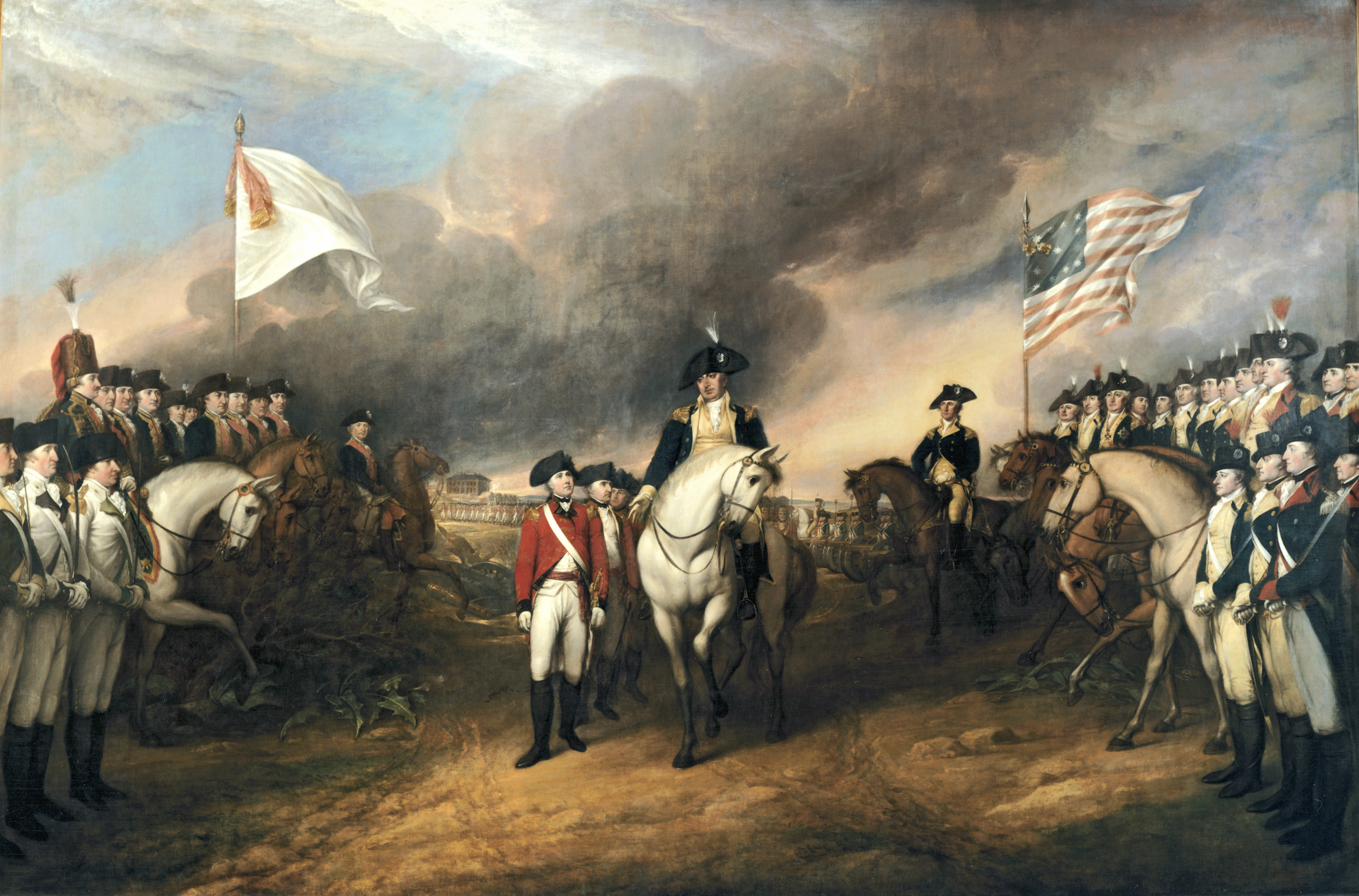
Surrender of Lord Cornwallis by John Trumbull

Charles, Earl Cornwallis (1738–1805) was a military officer who served in the British Army during the American War of Independence. He is best known for surrendering his army after the 1781 siege of Yorktown, an act that ended major hostilities in North America and led directly to peace negotiations and the eventual end of the war.

Born into an aristocratic family with a history of public service, Cornwallis was politically opposed to the war, but agreed to serve when it became clear that Britain would require a significant military presence in the Thirteen Colonies. First arriving in May 1776, he participated in the Battle of Sullivan's Island, before William Howe. He played a notable role in the partially successful New York and New Jersey campaign when George Washington successfully eluded him after the Battle of the Assunpink Creek and inflicted a decisive defeat on troops left at his rear in the Battle of Princeton.

Cornwallis was also involved in the Philadelphia campaign (1777–1778), leading a wing of Howe's army, before he became one of the leading figures of the British "southern strategy" to gain control of the southern colonies. In that role he successfully led troops that gained a measure of control and influence in South Carolina before heading into North Carolina. There, despite successes like his victory at the Battle of Camden, which burnished his reputation, wings of his army were decisively defeated at Kings Mountain and Cowpens. After a Pyrrhic victory at Guilford Court House, North Carolina, Cornwallis moved his battered army to Wilmington to rest and resupply.

From Wilmington, Cornwallis, in a move that became a subject of contemporary and historical debate, led his army into Virginia, where he joined with other British troops that had been raiding economic and military targets in that colony. Ineffectually opposed by a smaller Continental Army under the Marquis de Lafayette, he was eventually ordered to establish a well-defended port by General Sir Henry Clinton. Poor communications in the British establishment and French naval superiority over the Chesapeake Bay caused him to become entrapped at Yorktown without the possibility of reinforcement; he surrendered after three weeks of siege, on October 17, 1781. He was released on parole, and returned to England in December of that year. He and General Clinton engaged in a highly public exchange after the 1781 campaign in which each sought to deflect blame for its failure.

== Background ==
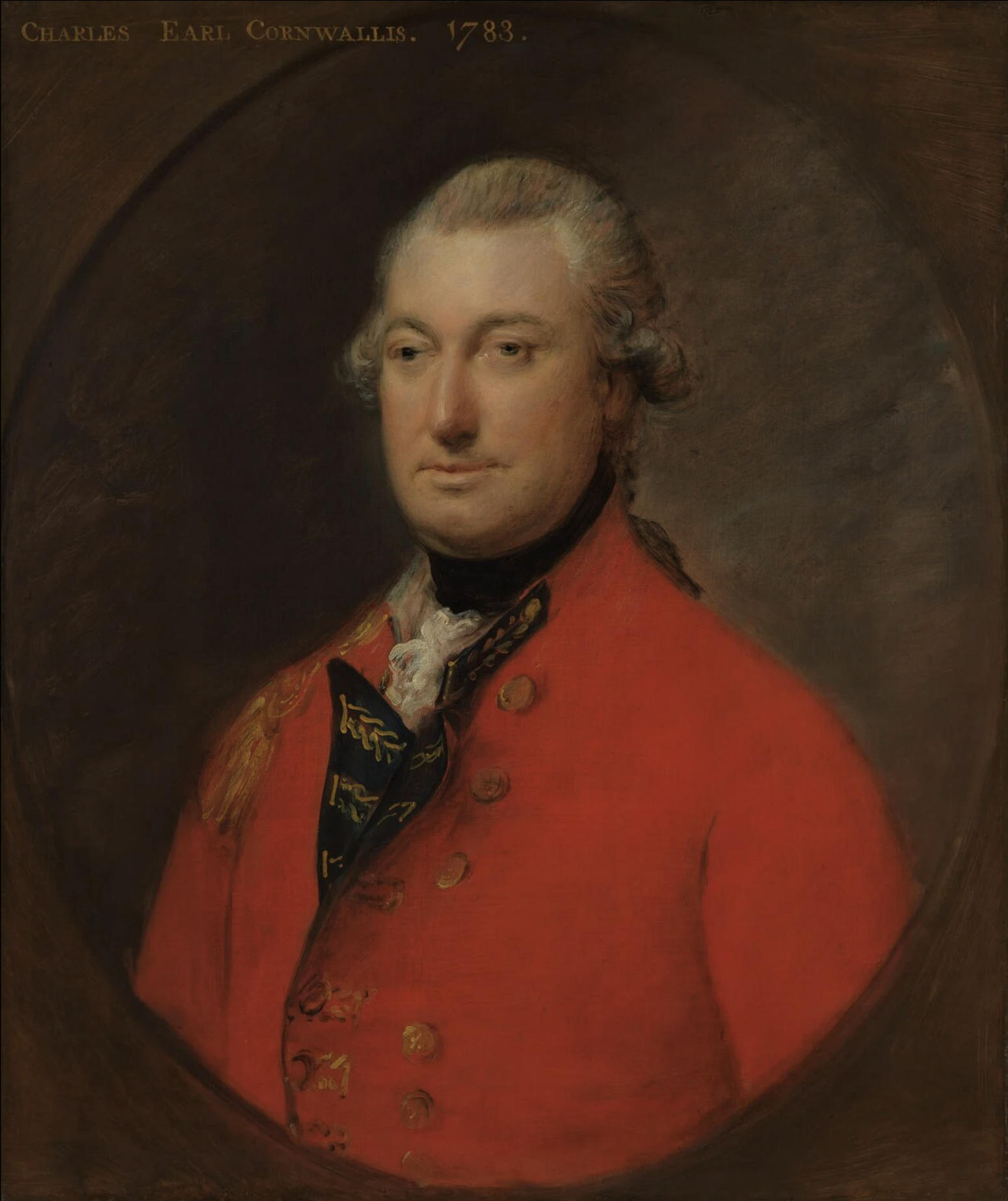
Portrait of Lord Cornwallis by Thomas Gainsborough, 1783

Charles, Earl Cornwallis was a military officer born into an aristocratic family. His family had a distinguished record of public and military service, and Cornwallis was no exception. Eager for action, he served with the British Army in Europe during the Seven Years' War, rising to the rank of lieutenant colonel. During those years he also served first in the House of Commons of Great Britain, and then, upon his accession to the title of Earl of Cornwallis in 1762, in the House of Lords. He was politically aligned with the Whigs, and was sympathetic to the complaints of the British colonists in North America, voting against the 1765 Stamp Act. When it was repealed the following year, he was one of a few voters against the Declaratory Act, in which Parliament continued to claim authority over the colonies. Also in 1766, he was given the colonelcy of the 33rd Regiment of Foot. In the following years he continued to argue politically in support of the colonists even as tensions rose between them and the Parliament. When the North ministry rose to power in 1770, Cornwallis adopted a less active voice in politics, and avoided seeking political appointments.

In 1768 he married Jemima Tullekin Jones, the daughter of a regimental colonel. They had two children, a boy and a girl, before Jemima died in 1779, and were by all accounts a happy, devoted couple.

== American War of Independence ==
After the opening skirmishes of the war took place near Boston, Cornwallis put his politics aside and sought active service. Despite his opposition to the king's colonial policy, Cornwallis had retained King George III's favour, and was rapidly promoted. On September 29, 1775, he was promoted to major general. In November he offered to serve in North America on a proposed expedition to the southern colonies, even though the number of officers that were senior to him in rank meant he was unlikely to get an independent command. This generosity was appreciated by the king and by Lord George Germain, the secretary of state for the colonies. On January 1, 1776, he was given the rank of lieutenant general in North America. His orders from Lord Germain were to accompany a convoy of troops from Cork, Ireland to North America, where he was to join at Cape Fear, North Carolina with General Sir Henry Clinton, who was bringing troops from Boston for operations in the southern colonies. Clinton arrived at Cape Fear well before the earl, since logistics delayed the convoy's departure, and then bad weather slowed its progress across the Atlantic. Cornwallis expected to have good relations with Clinton; a mutual friend, William Phillips, reported Cornwallis to be "very happy to think he shall serve under an old friend and a man he has so good an opinion of."

These forces then shifted south and participated in the first siege of Charleston in June 1776. Cornwallis was landed with Clinton's troops on Long Island, where they were unable to cross the deep channel separating the island from Sullivan's Island, where the principal colonial defenses were located. The colonists brought artillery up to oppose any attempted crossing, and the landing was a failure, as was the naval cannonade of Fort Sullivan.

=== New York campaign ===
After the failure in South Carolina, Clinton and Cornwallis transported their troops north to serve under William Howe in the campaign for New York City. In the Battle of Long Island, Cornwallis led the reserve division that took part in the successful flanking of the American position on Gowanus Heights. Cornwallis's role in the following weeks was minor; his command was not directly involved in the battles that drove George Washington across the Hudson River and into New Jersey. At the fall of Fort Washington, Cornwallis's troops sealed one of the last escape routes. General Howe then gave Cornwallis his first chance at an independent command, assigning him to capture Fort Lee across the river from Fort Washington. The Americans occupying that fortification were led by Nathanael Greene, who would later face Cornwallis in the south, and only barely made their escape. Cornwallis's prizes in the bloodless seizure of the fort included tents, guns, and other military supplies. Washington ended up withdrawing all the way across the Delaware River into Pennsylvania, with Cornwallis in pursuit until his force reached New Brunswick. His troops were exhausted from the chase, and his orders from Howe were to go no further. Cornwallis, who was criticized for disobeying or disregarding Clinton's orders in later campaigns, observed that he would have disobeyed Howe's orders if he believed further pursuit would have gained material advantage for the British. Howe joined him on December 6, and led the pursuit to the Delaware with Cornwallis in the van. In his orders of December 14, Howe recognized the successful close of the campaign "much to the honor of his lordship and the officers and soldiers under his command."

=== Trenton and Princeton ===
After the New York City campaign and the subsequent occupation of New Jersey by the British army, Cornwallis applied for leave to return home. He was preparing to sail from New York when orders arrived cancelling his leave. Washington's successful surprise attack on Trenton on the morning of December 26 demanded a response, and Howe ordered Cornwallis back to New Jersey to deal with Washington.

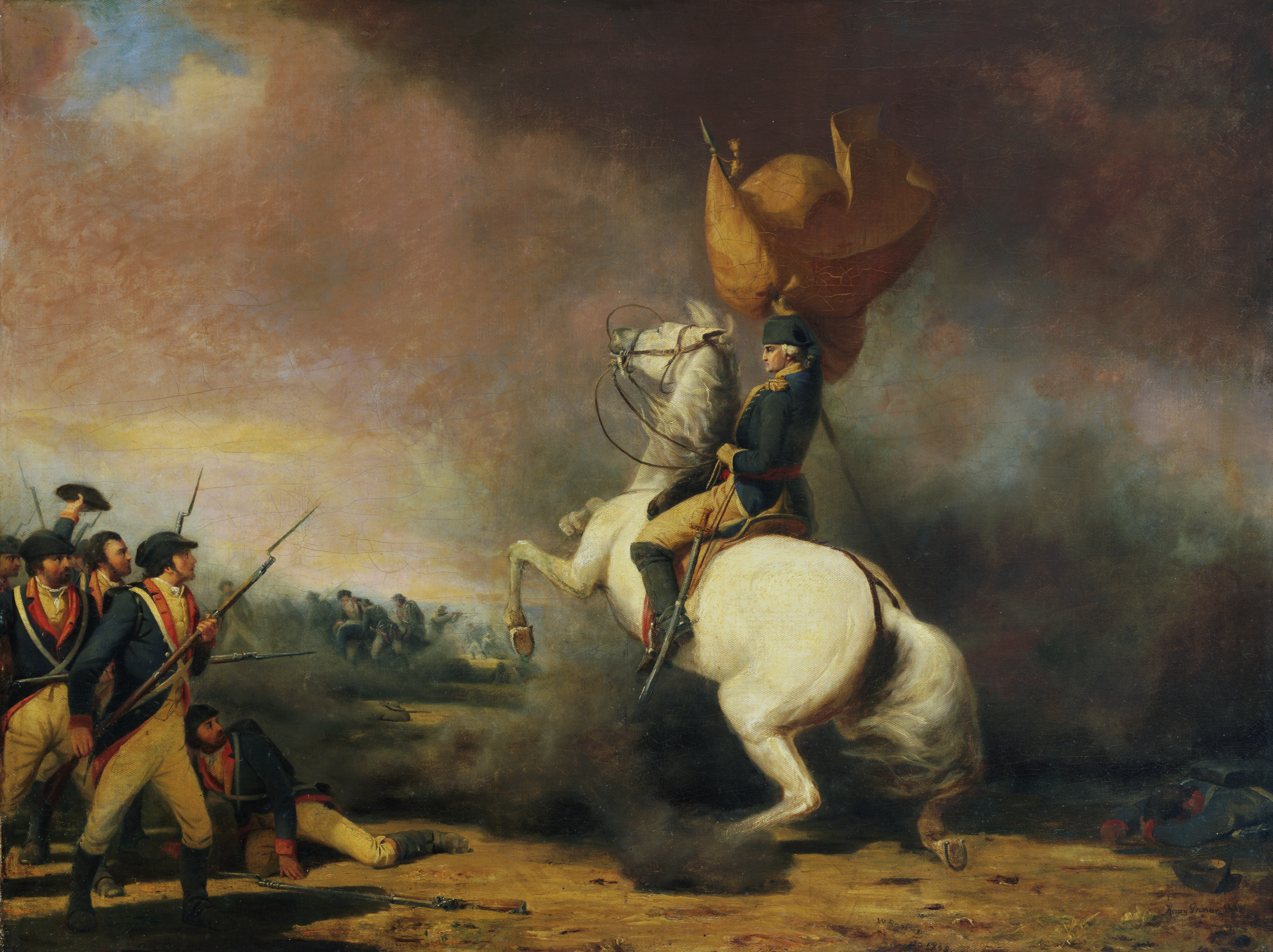
William Ranney's painting of George Washington at Princeton. Washington was Cornwallis' principal opponent in New Jersey and Pennsylvania.

Cornwallis rode into New Jersey on New Year's Day 1777 and gathered together the scattered British and German garrisons at Princeton, where an army of 8,000 came together. Leaving 3,000 men in posts at Princeton and Maidenhead, Cornwallis advanced with the remaining 5,000 down the main road to Trenton early on January 2, where Washington had established a strong position on the south side of the Assunpink Creek. He rejected advice from the Hessian Colonel Carl von Donop, who proposed a two-column approach that would turn Washington's right flank.

After a running series of skirmishes designed to delay the British march, Cornwallis finally reached Trenton and came upon Washington's position around sunset. In the battle that followed, Cornwallis's forces made three attempts to either cross bridges or ford the creek; all were successfully repulsed. Rather than attempt a nighttime assault across unknown terrain against Washington's position, Cornwallis ordered his troops to camp, noting that he could "bag the fox" in the morning. During the night, however, Washington's forces slipped around his, and successfully attacked the British outpost at Princeton. Although the Continental Army's disengagement was due in large part to Washington's use of deception, including the maintenance of blazing campfires and the presence of a small detachment of troops to keep up camp sounds throughout the night, Cornwallis also neglected to send out sufficient patrols to monitor Washington's activities. When the disappearance of Washington's army was discovered in the morning, Cornwallis immediately gave chase, but his troops only began to arrive two hours after the Princeton troops surrendered. Washington, his forces tired out after the night march and battle, moved north toward Morristown, while Cornwallis returned to New Brunswick, where the large base had been left garrisoned by a single regiment, and included the British warchest.

Cornwallis remained in New Jersey through the winter, where an ongoing series of skirmishes kept the German and British forces under his command constantly on edge. Persistent attacks on Cornwallis's own regiment, the 33rd, prompted him to plan a significant retaliatory attack. In early spring 1777, Cornwallis surprised Benjamin Lincoln's garrison at Bound Brook on April 13, very nearly capturing Lincoln. In June, General Howe ordered a movement in force into New Jersey apparently in an attempt to draw Washington into battle from a strong position in the Watchung Mountains. This move failed, although Cornwallis very nearly cut off a portion of Washington's army in the June 26 Battle of Short Hills. These engagements had no long-term impact, and Howe withdrew his forces onto naval transports for an expedition to capture Philadelphia.

=== Philadelphia campaign ===
General Howe hoped that capturing Philadelphia, the rebel capital, would end the war at a stroke. Cornwallis was given command of the army's light infantry in the campaign, which got underway when the army disembarked at Head of Elk (now Elkton, Maryland) on 25 August 1777. Advance units of Cornwallis's division were involved in the Battle of Cooch's Bridge on 3 September, as the army began its march northward. At the Battle of Brandywine on 11 September, Howe and Cornwallis led the flanking movement that ultimately forced the Americans from their position. Cornwallis also played an important role in the Battle of Germantown on 4 October, bringing up reinforcements late in the battle. When Howe sought to gain control over the Delaware River approaches to Philadelphia, Cornwallis was sent into New Jersey in November to secure Fort Mercer after a failed Hessian assault. The Americans abandoned the fort as his column approached. General Howe then sent Cornwallis to probe Washington's position at White Marsh in December; these movements resulted in a series of inconclusive skirmishes. When the army entered winter quarters in Philadelphia, Cornwallis took his long-delayed leave, sailing for England on 13 December. In addition to spending several months with his devoted wife, he informed the government of affairs in the colonies and visited the families of his colleagues. He sailed from England on 21 April 1778, and arrived in Philadelphia in early June, after a crossing that was much more pleasant than his first in 1776.

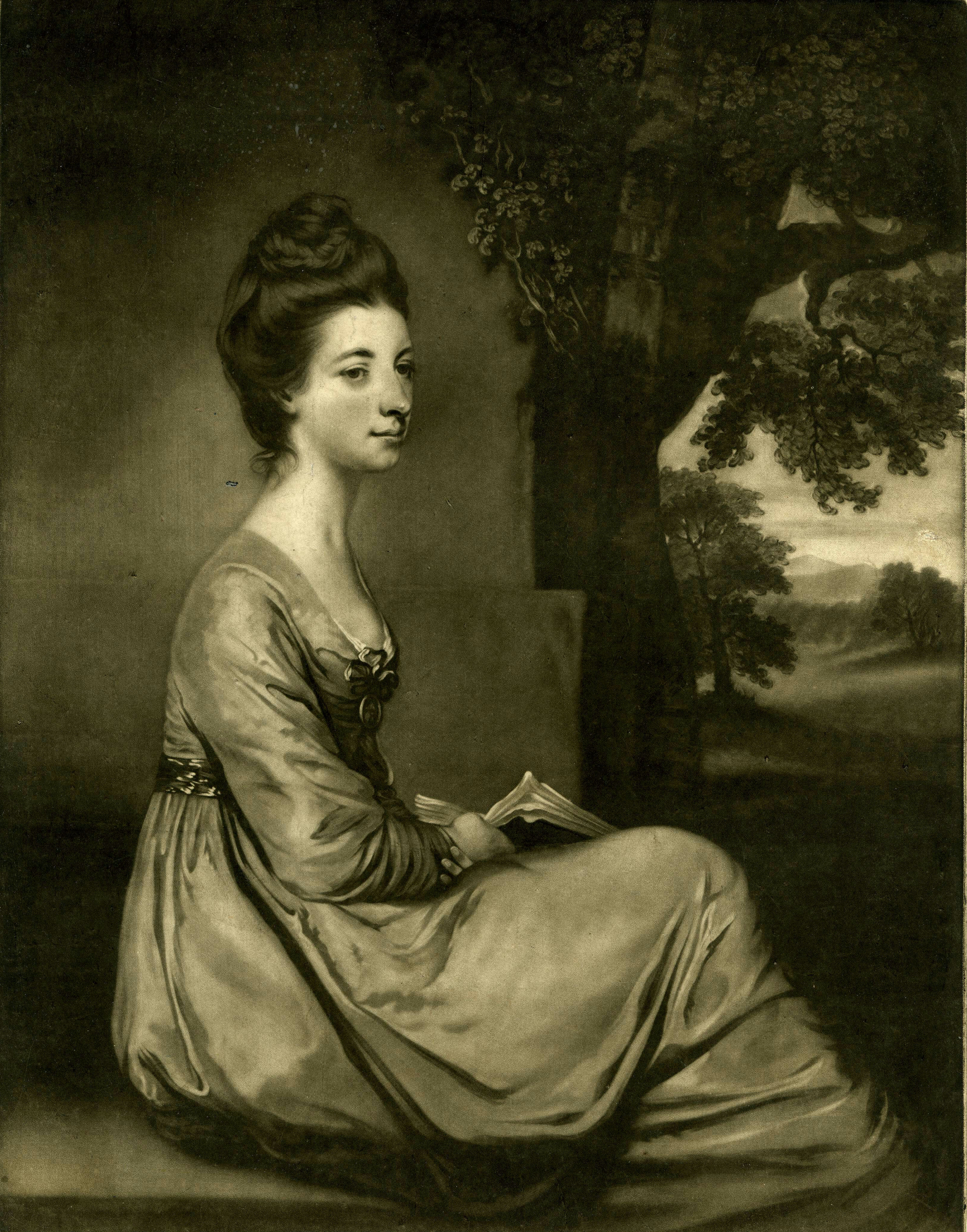
Jemima, Countess Cornwallis, in an engraving after a portrait by Sir Joshua Reynolds, 1771

During Cornwallis's absence, control of the British forces had passed to Clinton on the resignation of General Howe; as a consequence, Cornwallis was now second in command in North America. After the surrender of John Burgoyne's army at Saratoga and the entry of France into the war, the British decided to withdraw from Philadelphia to concentrate defenses in New York against the French threat. Cornwallis commanded the rearguard during the overland march from Philadelphia to New York City and played an important role in the Battle of Monmouth on 28 June 1778. After a surprise attack on the British rearguard, Cornwallis launched a counter-attack which checked the American advance. However, when he then led elite units against an entrenched Continental Army position, it refused to budge, and Cornwallis was forced to withdraw with heavy casualties. Even though Clinton commended Cornwallis for his performance at Monmouth, he eventually came to blame the earl for failing to win the day.

After returning to New York, Cornwallis applied to Clinton for leave to return to England, where his wife was ill. Clinton, believing Cornwallis was well positioned to influence the political leadership to gain additional troops for the war effort, granted the leave, and Cornwallis returned to England in December 1778. Although he spent some time pleading Clinton's case, his wife's illness distracted him. Finding her in "a very weak state indeed", he stayed with her until she died on February 14, 1779. Cornwallis was devastated by the loss, reporting that her death had "effectually destroyed all my hopes of happiness in this world." He eventually decided to return to service in April 1779; in a letter to Clinton he offered to serve either in the southern colonies or the West Indies.

=== South Carolina ===
Cornwallis returned to America in July 1779, where he was to play a central role as the lead commander of the British "Southern strategy". At the end of 1779, Clinton and Cornwallis transported a large force south and initiated the second siege of Charleston during the spring of 1780, which resulted in the surrender of the Continental forces under Benjamin Lincoln. Cornwallis and Clinton at first worked closely together during the siege, but their relationship deteriorated. Cracks had formed between the two as early as October 1776, when Cornwallis reported to General Howe critical comments that Clinton made about Howe's conduct at White Plains. Clinton also seemed to believe that one reason for Cornwallis's trips to England was to scheme for an independent command. Cornwallis as second in command held a dormant commission and would replace Clinton as commander in chief. He was aware that Clinton wanted to resign, but he did not want to be saddled with a difficult command situation should that occur. Cornwallis consequently avoided advising Clinton as much as possible, in order to avoid responsibility for poor outcomes. The deterioration in their relationship set the stage for some of their communication difficulties that resulted in Cornwallis's eventual surrender at Yorktown. In late April, Clinton detached a force under Cornwallis to ensure that the enemy's communications and supplies were interrupted around the city. Because of this, Cornwallis missed most of the siege bombardment and the surrender in May; forces directed by Cornwallis and led by Banastre Tarleton completed the encirclement of Charleston, skirmishing with the Americans at Monck's Corner and Lenud's Ferry. After the American surrender Clinton ordered Cornwallis to secure South Carolina's interior, while Clinton organized control of Charleston. Not long after Tarleton defeated Abraham Buford's Virginia regiments at Waxhaw, Clinton returned to New York, leaving Cornwallis in command in the south.

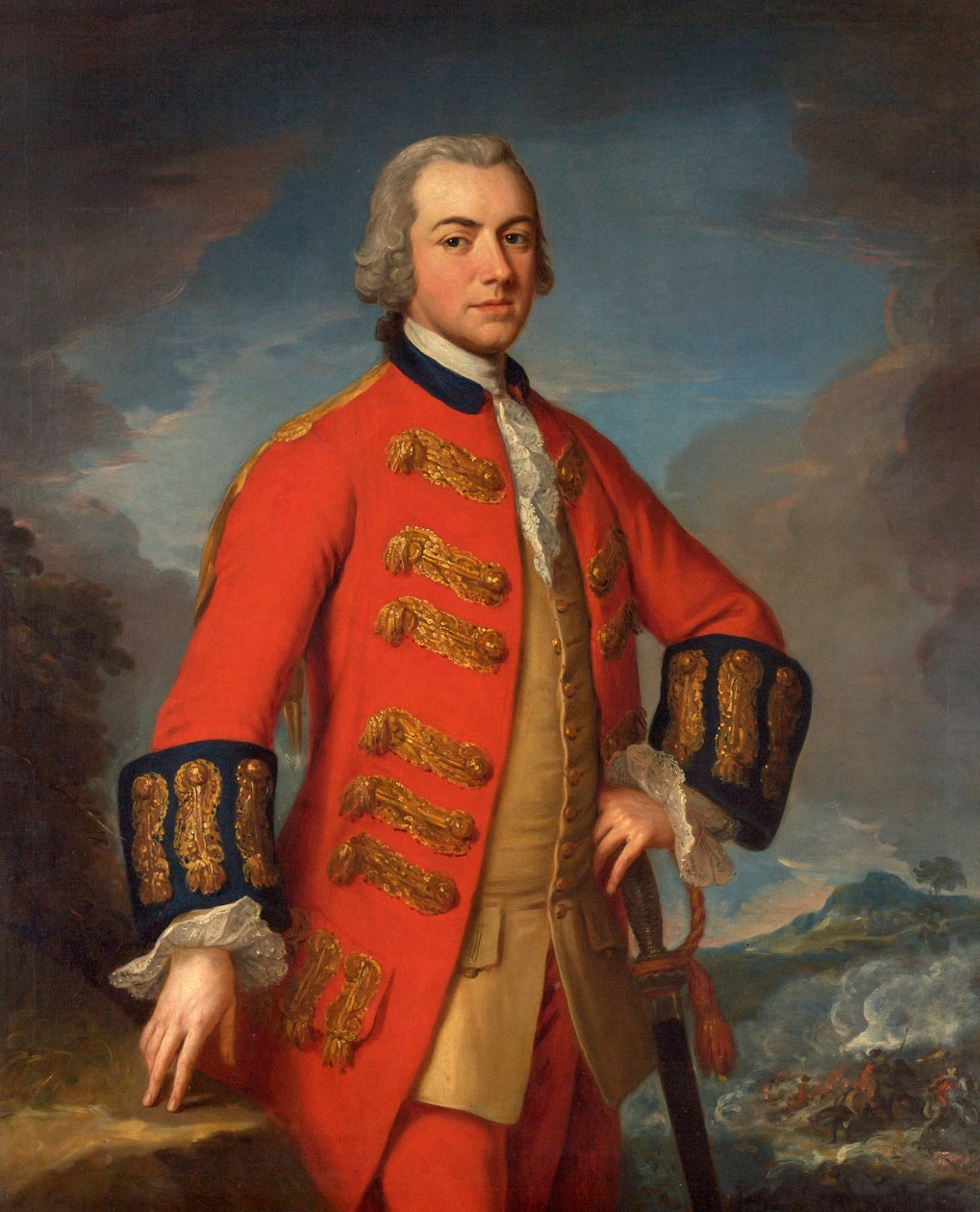
General Sir Henry Clinton, Cornwallis's superior. The two men disagreed on how to conduct the war, and their relationship deteriorated in 1780.

The task Clinton left Cornwallis with was to, first and foremost, preserve the gains made by taking Charleston, and only then engage in offensive moves. Clinton's orders gave Cornwallis wide latitude in how to achieve the goal of pacifying both South and North Carolina, after which Clinton expected Cornwallis to move into Virginia. Clinton wrote, "I should wish you to assist in operations which will certainly be carried on in the Chesapeake as soon as we are relieve from our apprehension of a superior fleet and the season will admit ..." However, Clinton provided Cornwallis with a relatively modest force of British, German, and provincial (Loyalist) regiments—about 3,000 men—with which to accomplish all of this. The forces he was given to accomplish this were limited by the necessity of keeping a large British force in New York under Clinton to shadow Washington. Cornwallis was expected to recruit more Loyalists, who were believed to be more numerous in the southern colonies.

After the fall of Charleston, Cornwallis set about establishing a British presence throughout South Carolina. Although he successfully established outposts, keeping communication and supply lines open was an ongoing challenge. Supplies not available locally (like uniforms, camp gear, arms, and ammunition) were delivered all too infrequently, and supply ships were frequent targets of local privateers. The weather that summer was rainy, turning the red clay roads of the area into impassable mires. In order to help provide fresh food and forage for his troops, Cornwallis established two commissioners. The first was responsible for administering goods confiscated from Patriots (he avoided confiscating supplies from Loyalists since he depended on them for manpower and intelligence), and the second for administering land that was confiscated. A chronic shortage of hard currency (another supply only infrequently delivered to Charleston) made it difficult to purchase supplies from any source, either Patriot or Loyalist. Cornwallis also attempted to reestablish civil authority under British or Loyalist oversight. Although these attempts met with limited success, they were continually undermined by Patriot activity, both political and military, and the indifferent abuses of British and Loyalist forces. The latter took the form of militia companies that harassed Loyalists, small British units, and supply and communication lines.

In early August, Cornwallis was alerted by Lord Rawdon, the commander of the British garrison at Camden that a new southern Continental Army, this time under the command of Horatio Gates, was approaching from the north. Cornwallis moved forces to Camden from Charleston, and on August 16 inflicted an embarrassing defeat on Gates at the Battle of Camden. The relatively untried Continentals in Gates' army were routed, and suffered heavy casualties. This served to keep South Carolina clear of Continental forces, and was a blow to rebel morale. The victory added to his reputation, although the rout of the American rebels had as much to do with the failings of Gates (whose rapid departure from the battlefield was widely noted) as it did the skill of Cornwallis. In London, Cornwallis was perceived as a hero, and was viewed by many there as the right man to lead the British forces to victory over the rebels.

=== North Carolina ===
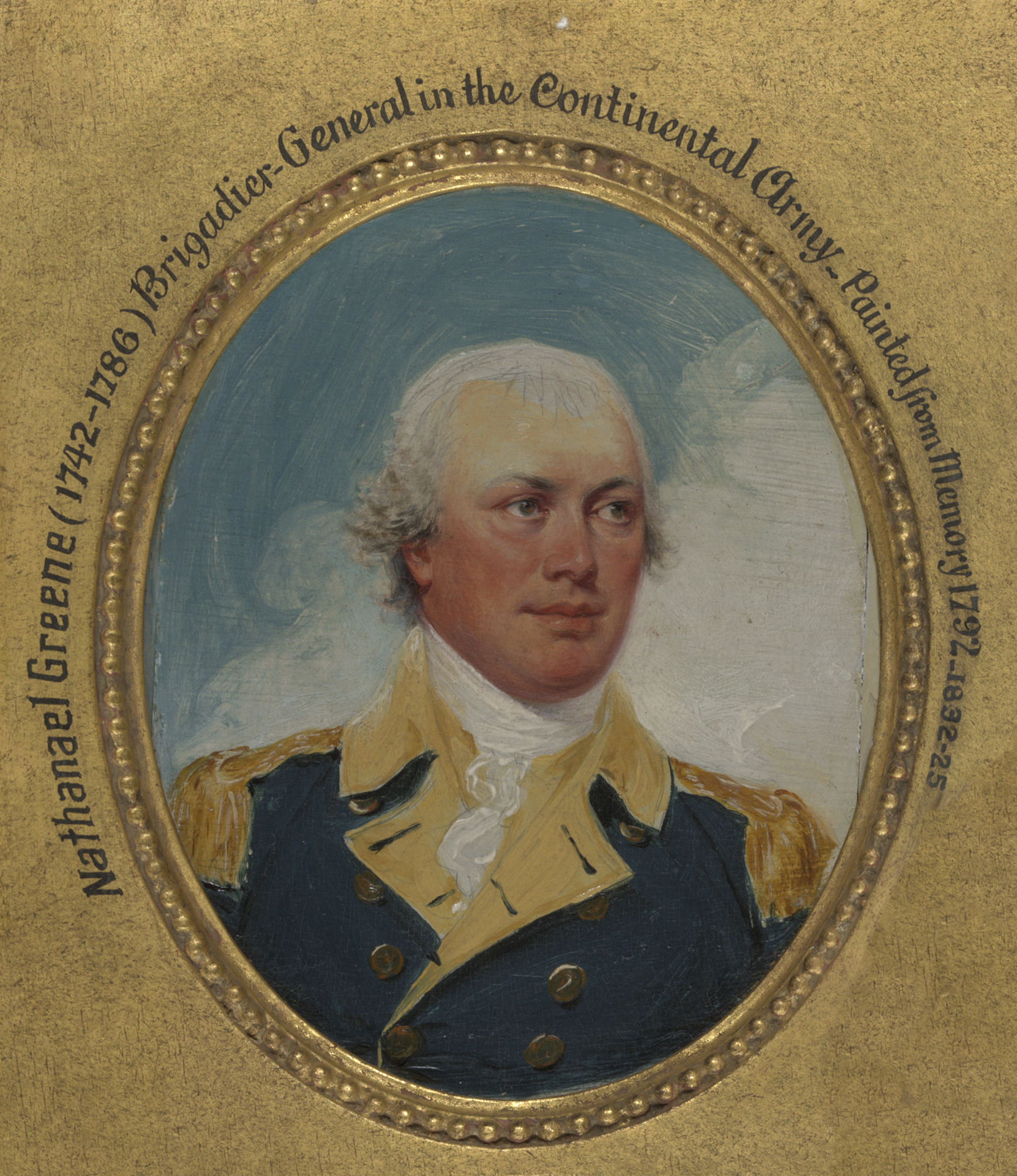
General Nathanael Greene's strategy was responsible for Cornwallis's withdrawal from the Carolinas.

Cornwallis, buoyed by the victory at Camden, then prepared to advance north into North Carolina while militia activity, led by Thomas Sumter and Francis Marion, continued to harass the troops he left in South Carolina. He detached Patrick Ferguson, his inspector of militia, to raise a company of militia in the hills of North and South Carolina and cover his left flank. Ferguson was zealous in execution of this assignment, raising nearly 1,100 men. However, he angered many colonists by issuing threats to "lay their country waste with fire and sword" if they continued their opposition, and a Patriot militia arose to oppose him. While Ferguson recruited, Cornwallis moved his army to Charlotte, North Carolina, skirmishing with Patriot forces left there to harass his advance. Ferguson's Loyalists and the Patriot militia, led by a coalition of commanders, clashed at Kings Mountain in early October, two weeks after Cornwallis arrived in Charlotte. The battle was a disaster: Ferguson was killed, and nearly his entire force was killed or captured. Kings Mountain was only about 35 miles (56 km) from Charlotte, within Cornwallis's range to assist. The defeat, combined with other failures to raise Loyalist militia and ongoing Patriot activity in South Carolina, prompted Cornwallis to retreat to Winnsboro, South Carolina, where he set up a winter camp. Attempts to capture either Marion or Sumter were repeatedly frustrated. To reinforce his army, he ordered Major General Alexander Leslie, stationed at Portsmouth, Virginia, to abandon that outpost and join him in South Carolina.

The British camp at Winnsboro was not particularly comfortable, and the men were often sick, living in crude accommodations not unlike those that Washington's men had erected at Valley Forge in 1777. The army suffered from a general lack of supplies, but wagons and horses were in particularly short supply, and the earl discovered that his quartermasters were profiteering on the provisioning of those items. The methods by which horses were acquired also served to alienate their Loyalist friends, since the quartermasters were sometimes indiscriminate, seizing horses from Patriots and Loyalists alike. His supply lines were also continually harassed, particularly by Francis Marion. In November he ordered Tarleton out to capture Marion; the two commanders successfully maneuvered themselves out of entrapments laid by the other. Tarleton eventually returned to Cornwallis, reporting that Marion's force had been broken up; several days later, Marion resumed his guerrilla war.

The arrival in North Carolina of a new Continental Army under Major General Nathanael Greene in December meant that the army would need to begin campaigning again. Although General Clinton had dispatched Brigadier General Benedict Arnold to Virginia to threaten Greene's supply lines, Cornwallis needed to deal with the wily general. Greene had detached Brigadier General Daniel Morgan with a light infantry corps to cause trouble in the highlands of South Carolina. Cornwallis sent Tarleton with a sizable force to chase down Morgan. In a tactically brilliant battle at Hannah's Cowpens on January 17, 1781, Morgan decisively defeated Tarleton, capturing most of his force. News of the battle so upset the earl that he was reported to snap a sword. He wrote that "[T]he late affair has almost broke my heart", and vowed to recover the prisoners Morgan had taken. Immediately giving chase, he was unable to gain on Morgan, who, although burdened with prisoners, was not burdened by a large baggage train. Cornwallis, in a move calculated to force his army to be able to move faster, ordered most of his baggage train destroyed on January 24. Starting with the personal effects of himself and his officers, he ordered the burning of everything except a minimal set of supplies. Cornwallis's second in command, Charles O'Hara, commented that the move "must ever do the greatest honor to Lord Cornwallis' military reputation".

This move inaugurated what has been called "race to the Dan". The Dan River separated Greene's army from his supply bases in Virginia, and Cornwallis wanted to catch Morgan before he and Greene could join forces, or before Greene could reach Virginia. In a rapid series of marches under extremely difficult conditions that tired out both armies, Greene and Morgan reunited their forces, and Greene made it across the flood-swollen Dan on February 13. Cornwallis decided to halt the pursuit, having effectively driven the Continentals from North Carolina, and returned to Hillsborough, where he again attempted to raise Loyalist militia.

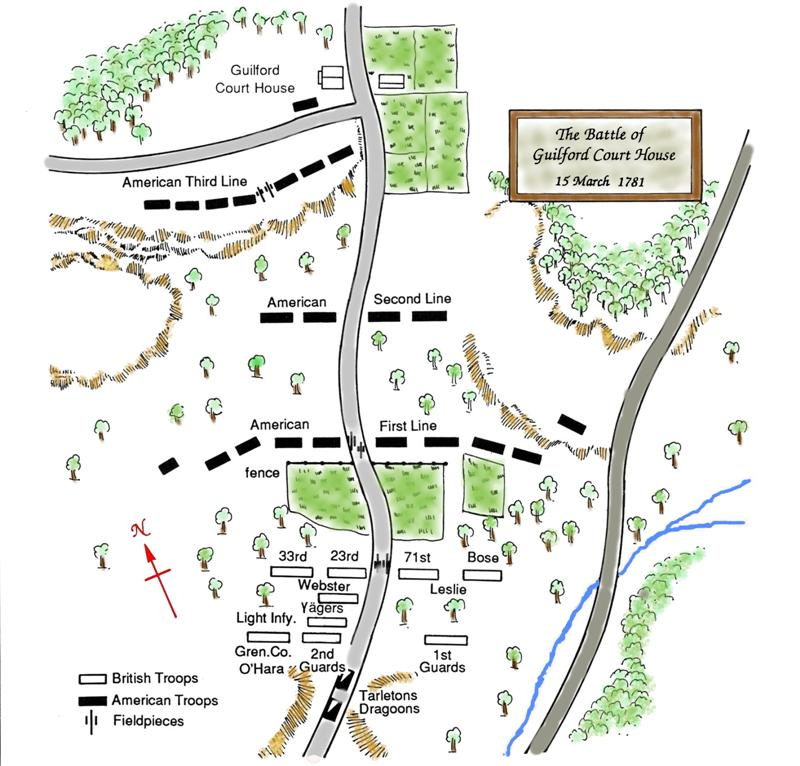
Map showing the battlefield of the Battle of Guilford Court House

After resting his troops, General Greene recrossed the Dan and returned to North Carolina. He and Cornwallis then engaged in a military dance of sorts, where Cornwallis tried to bring Greene to battle, while Greene, awaiting the arrival of more troops, sought to avoid it. Cornwallis's force was also constantly suffering food shortages, and the earl ensured that officers and soldiers shared equally in the suffering. Cornwallis was unable to intercept the arriving reinforcements, and learned that Greene had taken up a position at Guilford Courthouse on March 14, apparently ready to do battle. In the ensuing battle the next day, Cornwallis was victorious, but at significant cost. Greene's army had numbered over 4,000 men, while Cornwallis's was only about 2,000. The British successfully pushed the Americans back, but Cornwallis was several times in personal danger, and he was forced to commit his reserves early in the battle. With a furious melee going on before him and the outcome of the battle appearing to hang in the balance, Cornwallis made a controversial decision. He ordered his artillery to load with grape shot and fire into the melee, which included men from the elite Brigade of Guards. General O'Hara protested the move, but Cornwallis said "This is a necessary evil which we must endure, to arrest the impending destruction." A final charge then broke the Americans, who disengaged, leaving their artillery on the field. Although Cornwallis had won the battle, he had lost a quarter of his army, and the survivors were exhausted.

Cornwallis, his forces reduced by the seemingly endless campaign, then moved to Wilmington on the coast to resupply. Greene, whose army was still intact after the loss at Guilford Courthouse, crossed into South Carolina, where over the course of several months regained control over most of the state.

Cornwallis received dispatches in Wilmington informing him that another British army under Generals Phillips and Arnold had been sent to Virginia. He finally came to the conclusion that, in spite of orders that limited him to the Carolinas, he would best serve the British cause by going to Virginia to join his army with that of Phillips and Arnold. Writing after the campaign, he explained that he did not feel he could effectively support Lord Rawdon, who he had left in command in South Carolina, and that he would be unable to gain control of North Carolina until Virginia had been pacified. Since he had not received instructions from Clinton in some time, he wrote the general a letter specifically requesting direction: "I am very anxious to receive your Excellency's commands, being as yet totally in the dark as to the intended operations of the summer. I cannot help expressing my wishes that the Chesapeake may become the seat of war [...] North Carolina [...] is the most difficult of provinces to attack." He also wrote to Lord Germain arguing the case for operations in Virginia.

=== Virginia campaign ===
Cornwallis marched from Wilmington on April 25, sending orders to Phillips to meet him at Petersburg, Virginia. On his arrival at Petersburg on May 20, he learned that Phillips, an old friend of his, had died a week earlier of a fever. With his arrival and that of fresh troops from New York, the army that came under his command numbered about 7,200. It was opposed by a Continental Army contingent currently at Richmond under the command of the Marquis de Lafayette. Lafayette's force numbered 3,000, of which about two thirds were militia. He was also expecting to be reinforced soon by additional Continental Army troops from Pennsylvania led by Brigadier General Anthony Wayne.

==== Chasing Lafayette ====
Cornwallis, in the absence of instructions from Clinton, sought to execute the orders Clinton had given Phillips. These were to establish a naval station and to engage in raids against economic and military targets, and did not include any organized scheme of offense. Sending General Arnold, who complained of gout, back to New York, he set out in pursuit of the marquis on May 27. He also sent a letter to Clinton, outlining his preference for Yorktown over Portsmouth as the site of a naval station.

Lafayette, aware that he was not strong enough to oppose Cornwallis, fell back rapidly toward his supply base at Fredericksburg. When Cornwallis reached Hanover Court House he stopped the chase, and instead detached Tarleton and John Graves Simcoe on two separate raiding expeditions. Tarleton he sent to raid Charlottesville, where the Virginia legislature was meeting, while he sent Simcoe to Point of Fork, where Baron von Steuben had a supply depot. Both expeditions were qualified successes; Tarleton very nearly captured Virginia governor Thomas Jefferson at his home of Monticello, while Simcoe managed to destroy a significant cache of supplies despite being outnumbered by von Steuben's force. While these raids went on, Lafayette and Wayne joined forces, and Lafayette was further reinforced by the arrival of about 600 experienced militia a few days later.

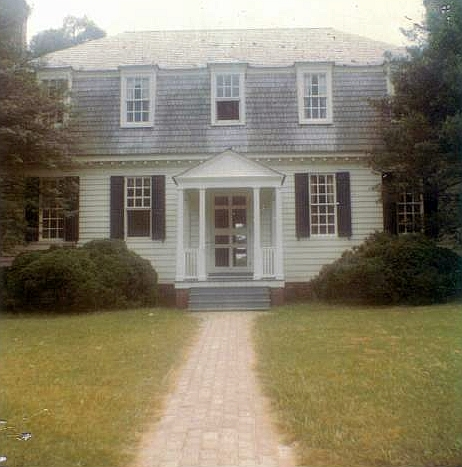
House where Cornwallis completed the surrender to George Washington, located near Yorktown, Virginia

Cornwallis began to slowly move east toward Williamsburg, practically ignoring Lafayette. He periodically detached Simcoe or Tarleton on foraging and raiding expeditions as he went, and his main army reached Williamsburg on June 25. Lafayette, buoyed by his reinforcements, followed the earl, and began sending out detachments of his own light troops to bring at least part of the British army to battle. Learning that Simcoe was foraging behind the main army, Lafayette sent out 600 men to track him down before he could rejoin Cornwallis. These two forces clashed on June 26 not far from Williamsburg, and Cornwallis escorted out reinforcements to cover Simcoe's retreat.

==== Confusing orders ====
At Williamsburg, Cornwallis received several letters from Clinton. Clinton was upset that Cornwallis had moved into Virginia, and ordered him to establish a suitable fortified point. He also ordered him to return any troops he could spare to New York. (This request, written in mid-June, reflected concern over the movements of the French army from Newport, Rhode Island to White Plains, New York, and intelligence that General Washington was considering an attack on New York City.) Cornwallis reconnoitered Yorktown, and found it to be inadequate. He informed Clinton that he would move to Portsmouth, embark troops there for Clinton's use, and assess whether Portsmouth was a more suitable location for a naval station.

Cornwallis accordingly began moving his army toward Portsmouth. This necessitated crossing the wide James River at Jamestown, a move the earl realized would give Lafayette an opportunity to attack. He decided to lay a trap for the marquis, who had come to the same conclusion when he noticed Cornwallis heading for the ferry. Lafayette's advance force, led by General Wayne, walked into the trap, and only just escaped it, suffering 150 casualties.

On July 8 Cornwallis received orders from Clinton directing the troops he was planning to embark for a potential operation against Philadelphia. Upon his arrival at Suffolk he received further dispatches from Clinton, including some that predated others he had already received. Cornwallis decided to proceed with the embarkation of troops for Philadelphia. By July 20, some of these troops had boarded their transports when fresh orders arrived countermanding those for the Philadelphia expedition. He was now ordered to, if possible, recall any embarked troops, and instead do nothing beyond establishing a fortified naval station. He was "at full liberty to detain all the Troops now in Chesapeake" for the purpose. It proved a fateful decision on Clinton's part, since the need to build and protect the new anchorage robbed Cornwallis of any freedom of manoeuvre. This was doubly unfortunate for as Cornwallis pointed out to his superior, the open bays and rivers of the Chesapeake, meant that any base there would "always be exposed to sudden French attack." Nevertheless, Cornwallis, after analysing Portsmouth and several other options, dutifully chose Yorktown and Gloucester Point (across the York River from Yorktown) as the best of the choices for the station. On August 2, he disembarked his army at Yorktown, and began fortifying the area.

==== Trapped ====
While Cornwallis fortified, forces from the West Indies and the allied camp outside New York were preparing to converge on his position. With the arrival of the French fleet under the Comte de Grasse at the end of August, and the arrival of General Washington's combined French-American army by late September, Cornwallis was trapped. After the Royal Navy fleet under Admiral Thomas Graves was defeated by the French at the 5 September Battle of the Chesapeake, and the French siege train arrived from Newport, his position became untenable.

On September 6, General Clinton wrote a letter to Cornwallis, telling him to expect reinforcements. Received by Cornwallis on September 14, this letter may have been instrumental in the decision by Cornwallis to remain at Yorktown and not try to fight his way out, despite the urging of Banastre Tarleton to break out against the comparatively weak Lafayette. The British military leadership in New York held a council on September 17 in which they agreed that Cornwallis could not be reinforced until they had regained control of the Chesapeake. Historian Richard Ketchum describes the decision of the council as leaving Cornwallis "dangling in the wind." One day earlier, Cornwallis wrote a desperate plea for help: "I am of the opinion that you can do me no effectual service but by coming directly to this place." Before dispatching the letter on the 17th, Cornwallis added, "If you cannot relieve me very soon, you must prepare to hear the worst".

"Sir,—I have the mortification to inform your excellency that I have been forced to give up the posts of York and Gloucester, and to surrender the troops under my command, by capitulation on the 19th instant, as prisoners of war to the combined forces of America and France."

— Cornwallis to Clinton, October 20, 1781

The siege formally got underway on September 28. Despite a late attempt by Cornwallis to escape via Gloucester Point, the siege lines closed in on his positions and the allied cannons wrought havoc in the British camps, and on October 17 he opened negotiations to surrender. On that very day, the British fleet again sailed from New York, carrying 6,000 troops. Still outnumbered by the French fleet, they eventually turned back. A French naval officer, noting the British fleet's departure on October 29, wrote, "They were too late. The fowl had been eaten." Apparently not wanting to face Washington, Cornwallis claimed to be ill on October 19, the day of the surrender, and sent Brigadier General O'Hara in his place to formally surrender his sword. General O'Hara first attempted to surrender to French Comte de Rochambeau, who declined the sword and deferred to General George Washington. Washington declined and deferred to Major General Benjamin Lincoln, who was serving as Washington's second-in-command. General Lincoln accepted the sword.

=== Aftermath ===
Cornwallis returned to Britain with General Arnold, and they were cheered when they landed in England on January 21, 1782. In 1782 Henry Laurens, a representative to the Continental Congress, was released from the Tower of London in exchange for a promise to effect the release of Cornwallis from his parole. Laurens was unsuccessful in this, and Cornwallis was not formally freed until a preliminary peace was agreed in 1783. His tactics in America, especially during the southern campaign, were a frequent subject of criticism by his political enemies in London, especially General Clinton, who sought to blame Cornwallis for the failures. His dispute with Clinton was particularly public; both men published works critical of the other, and much of their correspondence in 1781 was made public as a result. However Cornwallis retained the confidence of King George III and the British government.

== Later career ==
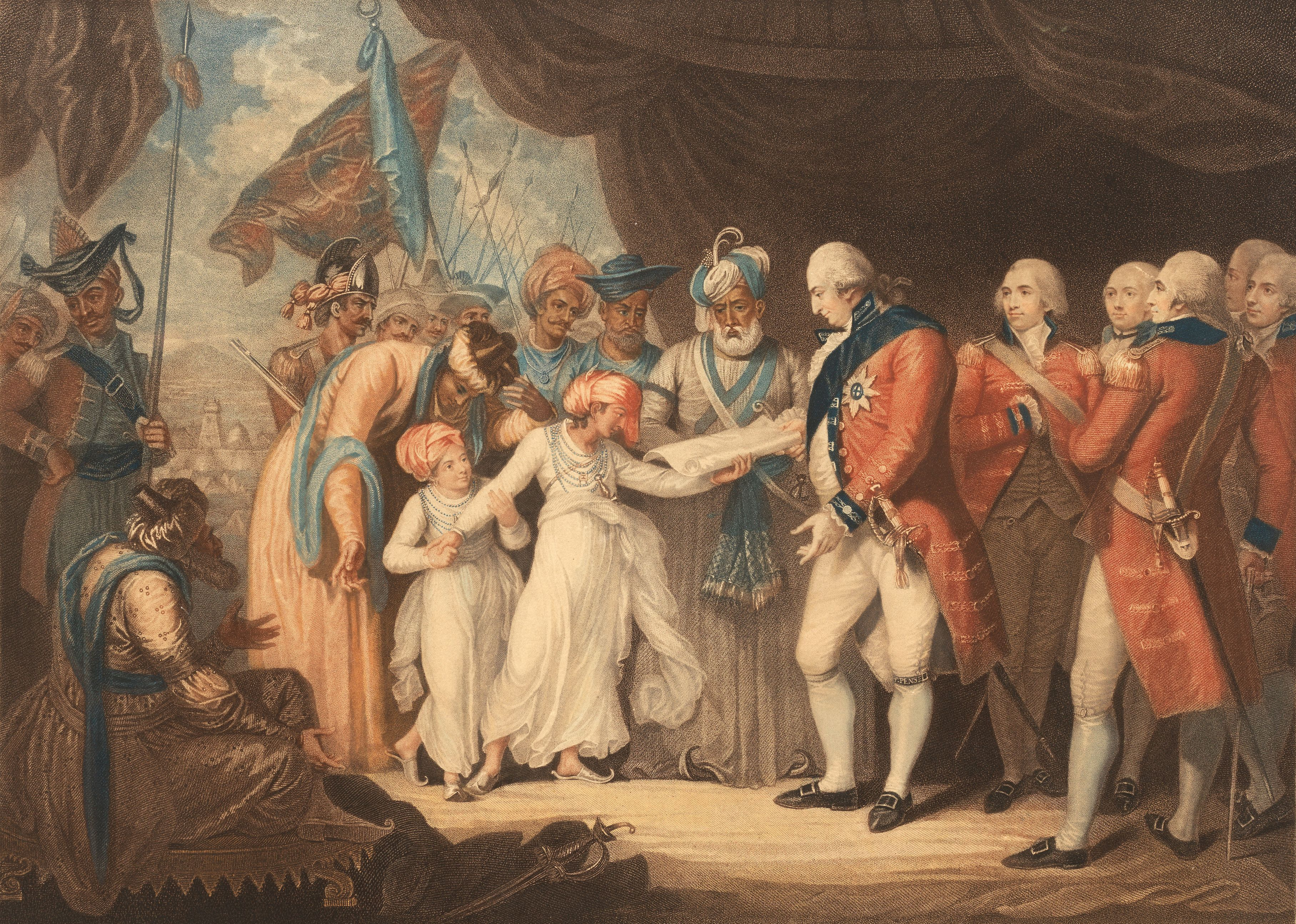
Cornwallis receiving as hostages the sons of Tipu Sultan at the end of the Third Anglo-Mysore War.

In August 1785 Cornwallis attended manoeuvres in Prussia along with the Duke of York where they encountered Frederick the Great and Cornwallis's Virginia opponent, the marquis de Lafayette. In 1786 he was appointed to be Commander-in-Chief of British India and Governor of the Presidency of Fort William, also known as the Bengal Presidency. He served in these posts with distinction, enacting administrative reforms in the British East India Company, and made changes to judicial, civil, and revenue administration in the company's territories that had significant long-term consequences. He returned to England in 1794, worn out from the difficult military campaigns of the Third Anglo-Mysore War, in which he led the first major British defeat of Tipu Sultan.

After holding administrative posts in London, he was despatched to the Kingdom of Ireland in June 1798 after the Irish Rebellion broke out. In addition to mopping up most of the remnants of the rebellion, Cornwallis was instrumental in convincing the Irish Parliament to pass the Act of Union (1800). This was a critical step in uniting the British and Irish crowns, creating the United Kingdom of Great Britain and Ireland. Cornwallis resigned his posts in Ireland in 1801 after King George refused to support Catholic emancipation.

The king then sent Cornwallis to finalize a peace agreement with Napoleon, and signed the Treaty of Amiens in March 1802 on behalf of the United Kingdom. In 1805 Cornwallis was again appointed to India. He died not long after his arrival, in October 1805. He is buried in Ghazipur, the place where he died.
