= Edward Stevens (general) =

American politician

- Born: 1745; Culpeper, Virginia
- Died: August 17, 1820 (aged 75); Culpeper, Virginia
- Burial place: Culpeper, Virginia
- Military career
- Allegiance: United States of America
- Service years: 1775–1781
- Rank: Lieutenant colonel Colonel; Brigadier general Major general (Virginia Militia)
- Commands: 10th Virginia Regiment
- Conflicts: American Revolutionary War; Battle of Great Bridge; Battle of Brandywine; Battle of Germantown; Battle of Camden; Battle of Guilford Court House; Siege of Yorktown

Signature
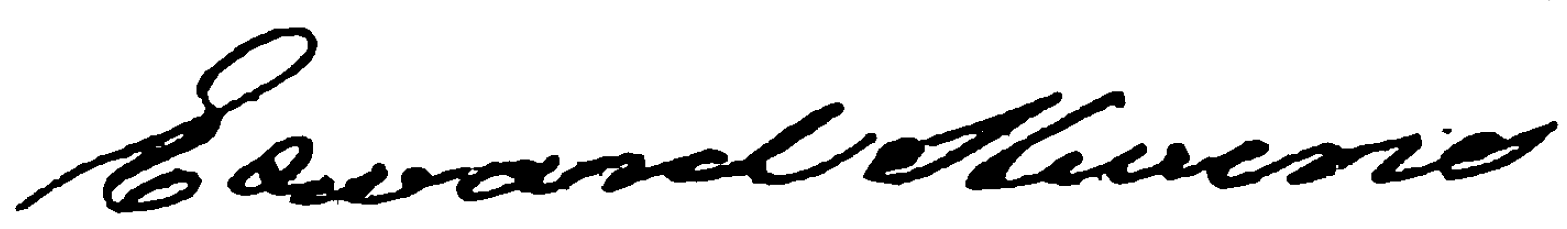

Edward Stevens (1745 – August 17, 1820) was an officer in the American Revolutionary War and later a state legislator for Virginia, serving in the Virginia Senate. He was elected to the American Philosophical Society in 1794.

Stevens began his military career as a lieutenant colonel in the 1775 Battle of Great Bridge, where he commanded a battalion of riflemen, the Culpeper Minutemen. Stevens distinguished himself in the battle and was given a command as colonel of the 10th Virginia Regiment. Stevens raised and equipped his regiment and marched to rendezvous with General George Washington, his direct commander. Stevens's command had their first engagement at the Battle of Brandywine, where the regiment did not enter the battle until the American forces had begun to retreat. Stevens troops covered the retreat and prevented the British from pursuing. Stevens received the public praise of Washington after both Brandywine and the subsequent Battle of Germantown.

Stevens became a brigadier general in the Virginia Militia. Stevens saw his first action as a general at the Battle of Camden. Before the battle Stevens complained that his "militia will not be satisfied with what regular troops well off with." At the council of war before the battle, Stevens advised "It is too late to retreat now; we must fight." Stevens's statement is thought to have convinced Horatio Gates to engage the British rather than retreat. The battle did not go well, and Stevens considered resigning, but Nathanael Greene convinced Stevens to continue his service.

Stevens next commanded his militia at the Battle of Guilford Court House. Stevens' militia was positioned behind a line of North Carolina militia. When the North Carolinians broke, dropped their weapons, and ran at the beginning of the battle, Stevens told his soldiers to make way for the retreat and that this was part of the battle plan. Stevens also positioned riflemen behind his line to shoot retreating soldiers. During the battle Stevens was wounded in the thigh. Stevens was in Charlottesville, Virginia, recovering from his wound when Banestre Tarleton launched a raid on the town to capture Virginia's legislature and its governor, Thomas Jefferson. Captain Jack Jouett, who had ridden through the night to warn of the British attack, drew the attention of the British and led them on a chase so the wounded Stevens could escape. Stevens returned to the battlefield to lead a brigade of 750 men at the Siege of Yorktown.
