= British Legion (American Revolutionary War) =

British unit of the American War of Independence

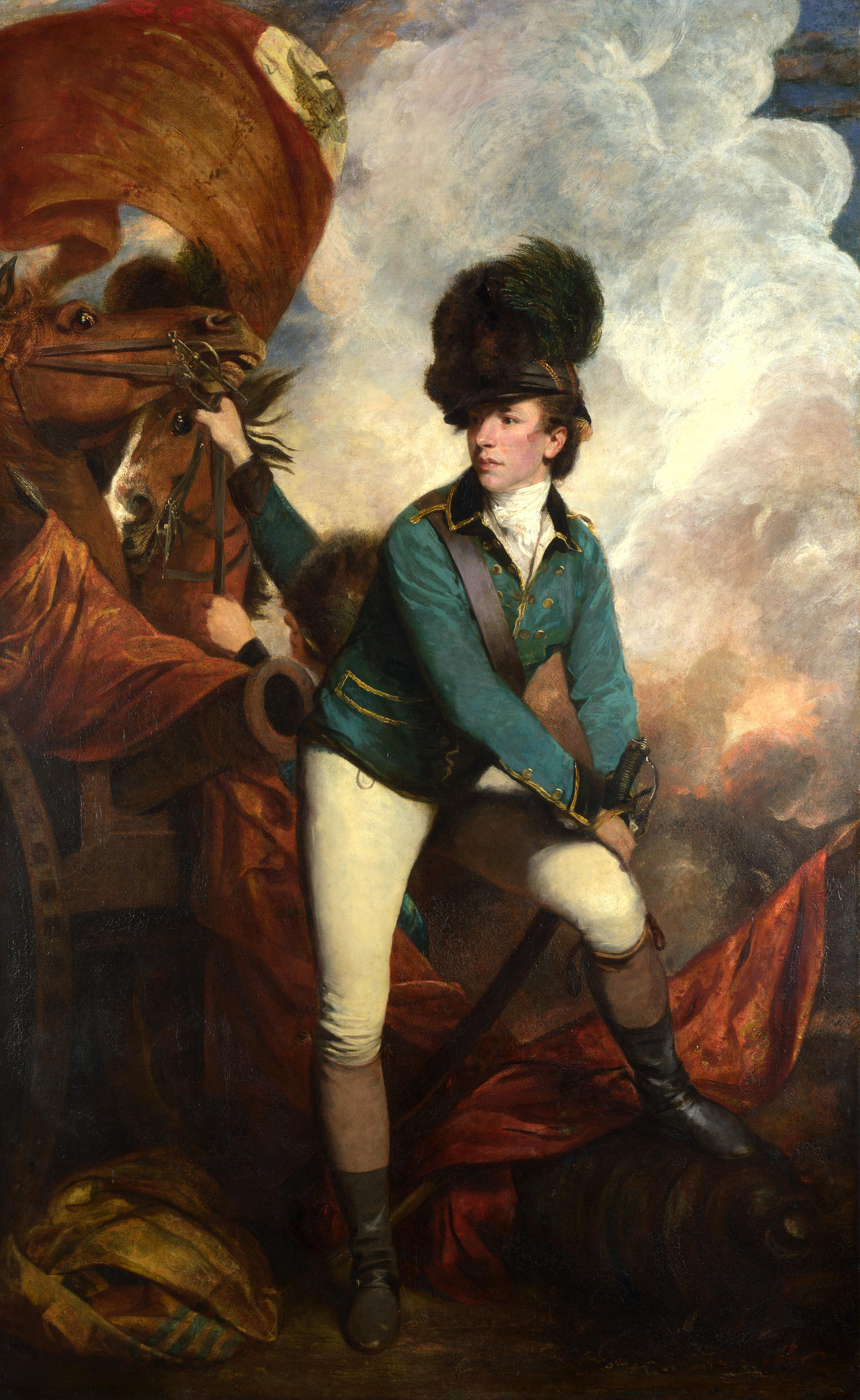
- Lieutenant-Colonel Banastre Tarleton in the uniform of the British Legion, 1782 painting by Sir Joshua Reynolds
- Active: 1777–1782
- Country: Great Britain
- Allegiance: British Army
- Branch: British provincial unit later, regulars of the American establishment (1779), then British establishment (1782)
- Type: Artillery; Dragoon; Light infantry
- Role: Anti-guerrilla warfare Cavalry tactics Charge; Counterinsurgency; Indirect fire Patrolling; Raid; Reconnaissance; Screening; Shock tactics Skirmisher; Tracking
- Size: 400 (Regiment)
- Garrison/HQ: Fort Edward, Province of New York
- Nickname: Tarleton's Legion
- Engagements: American Revolutionary War: Carolinas Campaign (1780–1782); Battle of Monck's Corner (1780); Battle of Lenud's Ferry (1780); Battle of Waxhaws (1780); Battle of Camden (1780); Battle of Fishing Creek (1780); Battle of Wahab's Plantation (1780); Battle of Charlotte (1780); Battle of Fishdam Ford (1780); Battle of Blackstock's Farm (1780); Battle of Cowpens (1781); Battle of Cowan's Ford (1781); Battle of Guilford Court House (1781); Virginia-Yorktown Campaign (1781); Gloucester Point Skirmish, Siege of Yorktown (1781)

Commanders
- Notable commanders: General Lord William Cathcart Lieutenant General Sir Henry Clinton Lieutenant Colonel Banastre Tarleton

The British Legion was a regiment-sized Loyalist unit on the American (provincial) establishment during the American War of Independence. It was made up of American infantry, artillery, and cavalry, to which a troop of the 17th Light Dragoon was attached. The Legion was commonly known as Tarleton's Legion after its commander, Lieutenant Colonel Banastre Tarleton, and often operated independently during the Southern Campaign of the American War of Independence.

== Regiment formed ==
The British Legion was raised in New York in July 1778 by Sir Henry Clinton to merge several small Loyalist units into a single force, a "legion" that combined infantry and cavalry forces and a battery of "flying" (light and fast moving) artillery. The infantry consisted of the Caledonian Volunteers, a partially mounted and partially foot unit raised in Philadelphia in late 1777 and early 1778, Ritzema's Royal American Reformers, the West Jersey Volunteers, and some members of the Roman Catholic Volunteers. The cavalry combined, in whole or in part, elements of Captain Kinloch's independent troop of New York Dragoons, the Philadelphia Light Dragoons, Emmerich's Chasseurs, the Prince of Wales' American Volunteers, and the 16th Light Dragoons. The regiment was commanded by Lord Cathart, as colonel; Banastre Tarleton was commissioned as lieutenant colonel. Once the unit left New York, Tarleton took full operational command. The Legion's peak operational strength was approximately 250 cavalry and 200 infantry.

== The Legion in the Carolinas campaign ==
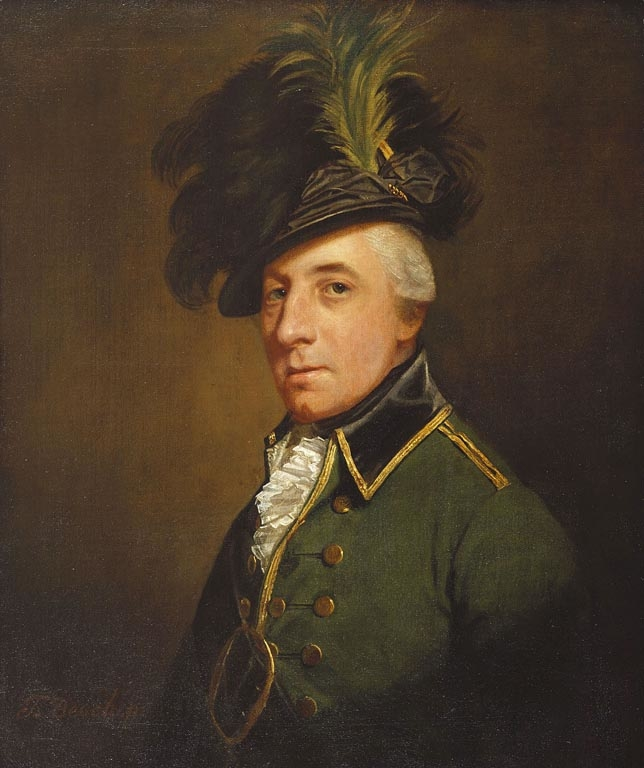
Major George Hanger, later Lord Coleraine (1751–1824) in the uniform of the British Legion

Elements of the Legion fought at the Siege of Savannah in 1779. The Legion as a whole was part of the British force that besieged and captured Charleston in 1780. The regiment participated in many battles in Clinton's South Carolina campaign, defeating General Isaac Huger and Lieutenant Colonel William Washington at Monck's Corner, dispersing another American force at Lenud's Ferry, and routing an American column under Colonel Abraham Buford at the Battle of Waxhaws.

During 1780, the Legion received reinforcements in the form of more drafts from Emmerich's Chasseurs and the Prince of Wales' American Volunteers and the permanent attachment of the Bucks County Dragoons.

After Lord Cornwallis took command of the southern Crown forces, the Legion participated in his defeat of General Horatio Gates at the Battle of Camden, nearly caught Thomas Sumter at Fishing Creek, were hit by a surprise attack at Wahab's Plantation, and was pinned by a rebel force at Charlotte, until the remainder of the British force could come up.

Throughout the autumn of 1780, the British Legion took part in anti-guerrilla operations, attempting to hunt down Francis Marion and Thomas Sumter and engaging in combat at Fishdam Ford and Blackstock's. The Legion seized and destroyed property in punitive attempts to suppress support for the guerrillas.

In January 1781, the Legion was part of the force under Tarleton defeated by Daniel Morgan at the Battle of Cowpens. The regiment suffered heavily in this action, particularly its infantry arm. After Cowpens, the remaining Legion infantry either transferred to the cavalry or joined the garrison of Charleston. From this point forward, the active British Legion was a cavalry force only.

After regrouping, the regiment led Cornwallis' movement into North Carolina in search of the American army under Nathanael Greene, seeing action at Cowan's Ford and Tarrant's Tavern.

The Legion was taken onto the American Establishment on 7 March 1781, as the 5th American Regiment. This made them an official part of the British Army, rather than provincial (local) troops.

On 15 March, the regiment fought at the Battle of Guilford Court House.

== The Legion in the Virginia campaign ==
As Cornwallis shifted his communications to the Chesapeake and abandoned the Carolinas for Virginia, the British Legion cavalry under Tarleton raided ahead of the British army, nearly capturing Virginia Governor Thomas Jefferson and the Virginia General Assembly at Charlottesville. The Legion again engaged in widespread destruction to punish rebel sympathizers and deny material support to the Continental Army and government.

After Cornwallis occupied Yorktown, the Legion moved across the York River to Gloucester on 2 October. They later fought a skirmish with French troops there and surrendered to the French at the conclusion of the siege. Lord Cornwallis sought terms of surrender that would have ensured no reprisals against the Loyalists in his army, but Washington refused to agree to them. Some of the men of the Legion were evacuated, sent with Cornwallis' dispatches to New York after the surrender. Some officers were paroled. Some enlisted men, and at least four officers who volunteered to stay with their troopers, were sent to a prison camp in Lancaster, Pennsylvania.

== Regiment disbanded and resettled in British Canada ==
On 25 December 1782, the regiment was taken onto the British establishment, suggesting that there may have been some thought to maintain the regiment as part of the postwar army. The infantry of the Legion still in Charleston, and such of the regiment as had escaped to New York, were eventually evacuated to Nova Scotia in 1783. Some officers transferred to other regiments of the British Army. The British Legion was disbanded on 10 October 1783. Most of those discharged settled in Nova Scotia.

== Legacy ==
Thomas Raddall, the prolific, award-winning writer on historical subjects, said of the British Legion:

Of all the loyalists who fought in the War of the American Revolution none were more famous in their day than those who formed the British Legion, generally known as Tarleton's Legion. By all accounts, British and American, this was the best led, the most enduring, the most dashing, the most relentless, and on the whole the most successful of the Loyalist regiments, and for all these reasons it was the one most feared and hated by rebels. To this day in the Carolinas and Virginia the exploits of Tarleton's Legion are folklore, and American histories still devote much invective to the memory of that celebrated corps…

American Oscar E. Gilbert, who has written much about tanks of the US Marine Corps, provides some of that invective:

…sent south to terrorize and subdue their fellow colonists, the battle efficiency of Tarleton's Legion was exceeded only by its mindless brutality.

and

The Legion had earned a reputation for butchery, literally hacking apart men who threw down their arms in surrender, and mutilating rebel wounded.

== See also ==
- American Revolutionary War § War in the South. Places ' British Legion ' in overall sequence and strategic context.
