= Bucks County Dragoons =

- Active: 1778–1782
- Country: Great Britain
- Allegiance: British Army
- Branch: British provincial unit later, merged with British Legion (auxiliary troops)
- Type: dragoons (mounted infantry)
- Role: cavalry, maneuver warfare, light infantry
- Size: ?
- Nickname(s): Bucks County Light Dragoons
- Engagements: American Revolutionary War: Clinton-Sullivan Expedition (1779); Carolinas Campaign (1780–1782)

Commanders
- Notable commanders: Lieutenant Colonel John Graves Simcoe Lieutenant Colonel Banastre Tarleton

The Bucks County Dragoons, also known as the Bucks County Light Dragoons, were an American Loyalist (American Revolution) unit during the American Revolutionary War. They were raised in Philadelphia, Province of Pennsylvania, in February, 1778 and returned with the British Army to New York in 1778.The Dragoons were attached to John Simcoe's Queen's Rangers for the 1779 campaign, and later attached to Banastre Tarleton's British Legion in Lord Cornwallis's 1780–1782 Carolinas Campaign. They were permanently merged into the British Legion in 1782.

== See also ==
- Bucks County, Pennsylvania
- Doan Outlaws
