= Volunteers of Ireland =

American Revolutionary War Loyalist military unit

- Active: 1778–1784
- Country: Great Britain
- Allegiance: Kingdom of Great Britain
- Branch: British Army
- Type: British provincial regiment; later part of the British establishment
- Role: Infantry
- Size: Regiment
- Engagements: Battle of Monmouth; Mathew–Collier Raid; Siege of Charleston; Battle of Camden; Battle of Hobkirk's Hill; Siege of Ninety-Six; Battle of Eutaw Springs

Commanders
- Notable commanders: Colonel Lord Francis Rawdon-Hastings

The Volunteers of Ireland, also known as the 2nd American Regiment and later the 105th Regiment of Foot, was a British provincial regiment raised for Loyalist service during the American Revolutionary War. It was placed on the American establishment in 1779 as the 2nd American Regiment and on the British establishment in 1782 as the 105th Regiment of Foot. The Volunteers of Ireland should not be confused with the contemporaneous Irish Volunteers, an autonomous militia that supported the Irish Patriot Party in the 1770s and 1780s.

== History ==
=== Formation ===
The regiment was raised in Philadelphia, Province of Pennsylvania, as the Volunteers of Ireland in 1777 and went to New York City with the British Army in April 1778. The regiment was placed on the American establishment as the 2nd American Regiment (Volunteers of Ireland) on 2 May 1779, by Francis Rawdon-Hastings, an Anglo-Irish lord who had joined the British Army and rose through the officer ranks and had been given permission to form a British Provincial regiment from men born in Ireland (then under British rule), serving in other Loyalist units, in the American Thirteen Colonies.

=== American Revolutionary War ===
Following the Patriot surrender at Charleston in May 1780, the Volunteers helped win the Battle of Camden, where Sergeant Thomas Hudson received a decoration for heroism, one of only two such decorations given during the duration of the prosecution of the war to a soldier of the British Army. The regiment was the primary unit in the Battle of Hobkirk's Hill in April 1781, as well as the relief of the Loyalist fort, at the Siege of Ninety-Six in May 1781. They remained in South Carolina until the British surrender of General Lord Cornwallis, at Yorktown in October 1781. The regiment was removed from the Province of South Carolina and taken by ship to New York. The Volunteers were put on the British establishment as the 105th Regiment of Foot on 25 December 1782.

=== Disbandment ===
The soldiers of the Volunteers of Ireland were mustered out in New York City, and thereafter taken by ship to Nova Scotia. This was in response to the policy of resettlement for British colonists displaced from their lands during the war, coupled with the fact that the vast majority of soldiers were Irish, and England had no desire to return Irish emigrants back to either England or Ireland, because it needed new settlers in Canada. It was also much cheaper to move them to Canada than it would be to physically return them to England. The regiment was placed in a cadre status, and officially "moved" to England in 1784.
