= American establishment (British Army) =

The American establishment refers to the amalgamation of several British provincial regiments raised in the American colonies during the American Revolutionary War under a single military establishment within the regular British army. The establishment was created on 2 May 1779 and set at five regiments; the Queens Rangers, Volunteers of Ireland, New York Volunteers, the King's American Regiment and the British Legion, which were numbered 1st, 2nd, 3rd, 4th and 5th American Regiments respectively.

In 1782 the 2nd American regiment (Volunteers of Ireland) was placed on the Irish establishment as the 105th Foot, whilst 4th and 5th American regiments were placed on the British establishment. The remaining two regiments were disbanded in 1783.

The creation of an army establishment in America followed the British tradition which existed in Ireland and Britain and gave the chosen American regiments nominally equal status to regular British units. In doing so the government hoped to encourage loyalist enlistment in the British army.

== List of regiments ==
- 1st American Regiment of Foot (Queen's Rangers)
- 2nd American Regiment of Foot (Volunteers of Ireland)
- 3rd American Regiment of Foot (New York Volunteers)
- 4th American Regiment of Foot (King's American Regiment)
- 5th American Regiment of Foot (British Legion)

== See also ==
- List of British units in the American Revolutionary War

== Sources ==
- Katcher, Phillip (1973). Encyclopedia of British, Provincial, and German Army Units, 1775-1783. Stackpole Books. ISBN 978-0-811-70542-4.
- Wood-Holt, B (1990). The King's loyal Americans. Holland House. ISBN 978-0-969-46720-5.
- Fryer, Mary (1989). Elizabeth Posthuma Simcoe 1762-1850: A Biography. ISBN 978-1-550-02064-9.
- Fryer, Mary (2012). King's Men: The Soldier Founders of Ontario. Dundurn Group. ISBN 978-0-919-67051-8.
