= William Washington =

American military officer

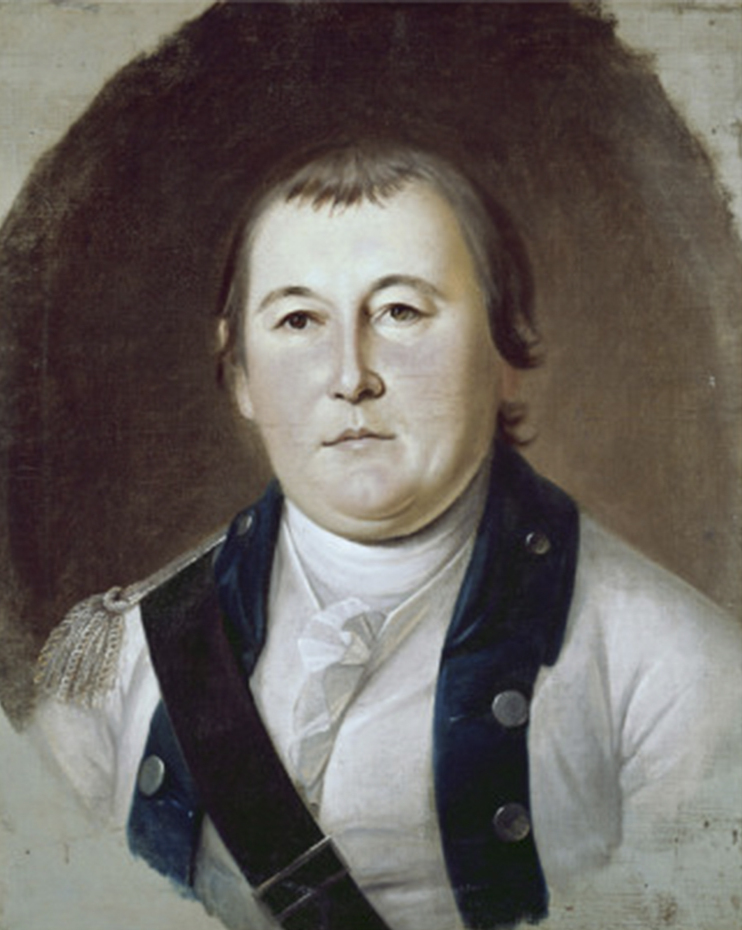
- Portrait by Charles Willson Peale, 1784

Member of the South Carolina House of Representatives for Charleston
- In office 1787–1804

Personal details
- Born: February 28, 1752 Stafford County, Virginia
- Died: March 10, 1810 (aged 58) Charleston County, South Carolina, U.S.
- Resting place: 3956 Waldon Road, Charleston, South Carolina (on Rantowles Creek)
- Spouse: Jane Riley Elliot
- Relations: Washington family
- Children: son, daughter

Military service
- Allegiance: United Colonies; United States
- Branch/service: Continental Army; Virginia militia United States Army; South Carolina Militia
- Years of service: 1775–1783; 1798-1800
- Rank: Brigadier general
- Unit: 3rd Virginia Regiment; 3rd Continental Light Dragoons; 4th Continental Light Dragoons; 1st Continental Light Dragoons; 7th Brigade of South Carolina militia
- Battles/wars: American Revolutionary War; Battle of Harlem Heights; Battle of Trenton; Baylor Massacre; Battle of Monck's Corner; Battle of Lenud's Ferry; Battle of Cowpens; Battle of Guilford Courthouse; Battle of Hobkirk's Hill; Battle of Eutaw Springs; Quasi-War

Brigadier General William Washington (February 28, 1752 – March 6, 1810) was an American military officer who served as a cavalry officer of the Virginia militia and Continental Army during the American Revolutionary War, who also served on General George Washington's staff in 1798 during the Quasi-War. Primarily known as a commander of light dragoons, he led mounted troops in a number of notable battles in the Carolinas during the campaigns of 1780 and 1781.

Following the conflict, this William Washington moved to South Carolina, where he married and served in the state legislature as well as led the Seventh Brigade of the South Carolina militia. Cavalry Commander William Washington of Stafford County and South Carolina has often been confused with his distant cousin William Augustine Washington, also a Revolutionary War patriot and planter, who served as a delegate representing Westmoreland County, Virginia.

== Before the war ==
Born in Stafford County, Virginia, William was the second son of Bailey Washington and Catherine (née Storke) Washington. Correspondence between William and George Washington, first President of the United States, indicates William and George were second cousins once removed. William received an education appropriate to his Southern slaveowning planter class, including tutoring from Reverend Dr. William Stuart, a Virginia clergyman. William learned the Greek language and may have studied theology for a potential career in the church.

However, in 1775, he established a local Stafford County militia company and soon abandoned his studies and took up arms against the British government during the Revolutionary War. William and his elder brother, Henry, reputedly drew straws to see who would get to join the Continental Army and who would stay home and manage the family plantations. William won.

== Revolutionary War ==
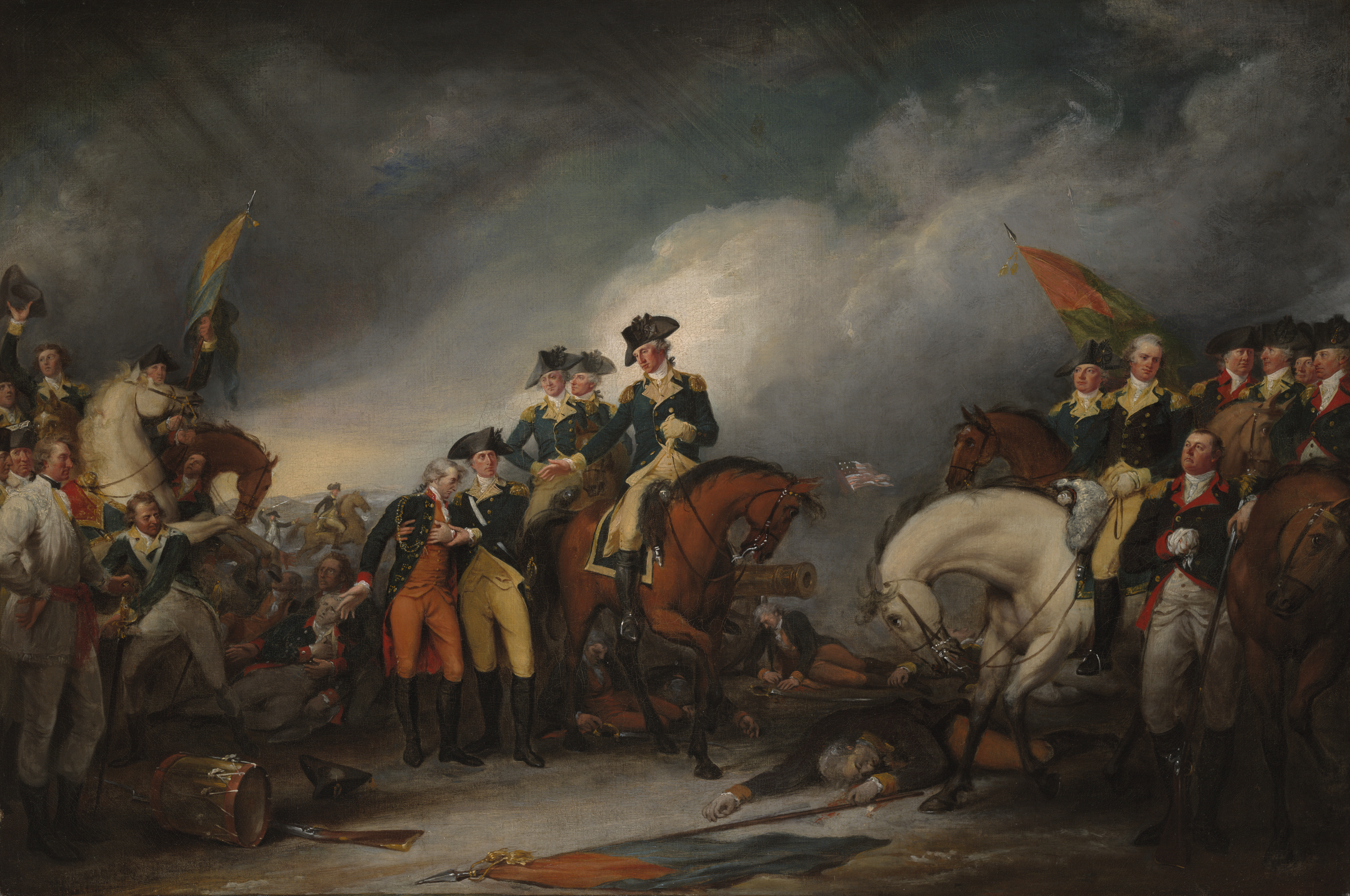
The painting The Capture of the Hessians at Trenton, December 26, 1776 by John Trumbull. William Washington stands at right and James Monroe is on the ground at left

Washington was elected a captain of Stafford County Minutemen on September 12, 1775; his militia company was soon assigned to Hugh Mercer's newly formed militia regiment, which became part of the 3rd Virginia Regiment, Continental Line on February 25, 1776, with Washington commanding its 7th Company. His lieutenant and second-in-command was fellow Virginian James Monroe, future fifth US. President. Their first combat was the Battle of Harlem Heights in New York on September 16, 1776, during which he may have been wounded by enemy musket fire. At the Battle of Trenton, under command of Nathanael Greene and after a night of scouting the countryside with Monroe to prevent detection, Washington led a successful assault into the town. His company drove in Hessian pickets, and seized two cannon on King Street, capturing their crews. Washington received wounds to both hands during the action, along with Lt. Monroe who was severely wounded in the shoulder. Both received thanks from Continental Army commander-in-chief George Washington.

On January 27, 1777, William was promoted to the rank of major and assigned to the newly created 4th Continental Light Dragoons. In the fall of 1778, he was assigned to the 3rd Continental Light Dragoons, which was severely mauled in a surprise attack on the night of September 27 at Old Tappan, New Jersey, by a force of British light infantry. Only 55 of the lightly armed dragoons escaped the attack and their commander, Lt. Col. George Baylor, was wounded and captured. Washington was promoted to lieutenant colonel and placed in command of the 3rd Light Dragoons on November 20, 1778. Washington's unit spent the summer of 1779 recruiting and remounting. On November 19, 1779, his unit was transferred to the war's Southern theater, and marched to join the army of Major General Benjamin Lincoln in Charleston, South Carolina.

On March 10, 1780, Washington's regiment joined forces with the remnants of the 1st Continental Light Dragoons at Bacon's Bridge, South Carolina, to reconnoiter and screen against the advancing British. On March 26, his first encounter with the British Legion, under command of Lieutenant Colonel Banastre Tarleton, resulted in a minor victory near Rantowle's Bridge on the Stono River in South Carolina. Afterward, on the Ashley River during the fight at Rutledge's Plantation on March 26, 1780, Lt. Col. Washington again bested a detachment of Tarleton's dragoons and infantry. Tarleton, however, attacked the encampment of General Isaac Huger at Monck's Corner on the night of April 14, 1780, and routed the Continentals, including the 3rd Light Dragoons, which lost 15 dead, 17 wounded, and 100 dragoons captured, along with 83 horses.

Washington and his remaining troops fled across the Santee River to escape capture. The severe attrition of Washington's command forced its amalgamation with the 1st Continental Light Dragoons under Lt. Col. Anthony Walton White. This force was defeated at Lenud's Ferry, waiting to cross the flooded Santee, on May 6, 1780. White was captured and Washington assumed command of the 1st-and-3rd Dragoons. The force withdrew to North Carolina when Lincoln surrendered the southern army and Charleston on May 12.

The reconstituted Southern army, now under General Horatio Gates, was defeated at the Battle of Camden, South Carolina, on August 16, 1780, which opened up the South to British control. Gates was replaced by General Nathanael Greene, who divided his army into two groups, one of which was led by General Daniel Morgan and the other by himself. Washington was placed under the command of General Morgan, for whom he participated in a series of raids in the western part of South Carolina. Two notable successes were the capture of Rugeley's Mill near Camden on December 4, 1780; Washington with 60 troops bluffed 112 Loyalists into surrendering a strongly fortified homestead without firing a shot by use of a "Quaker Gun", mounting a felled tree trunk on wagon axles to resemble a cannon; and the defeat of a Tory partisan unit at Hammond's Old Store in the Little River District on December 27, 1780; Washington routed 250 Georgia Loyalists, killing or wounding 150 and capturing the rest.

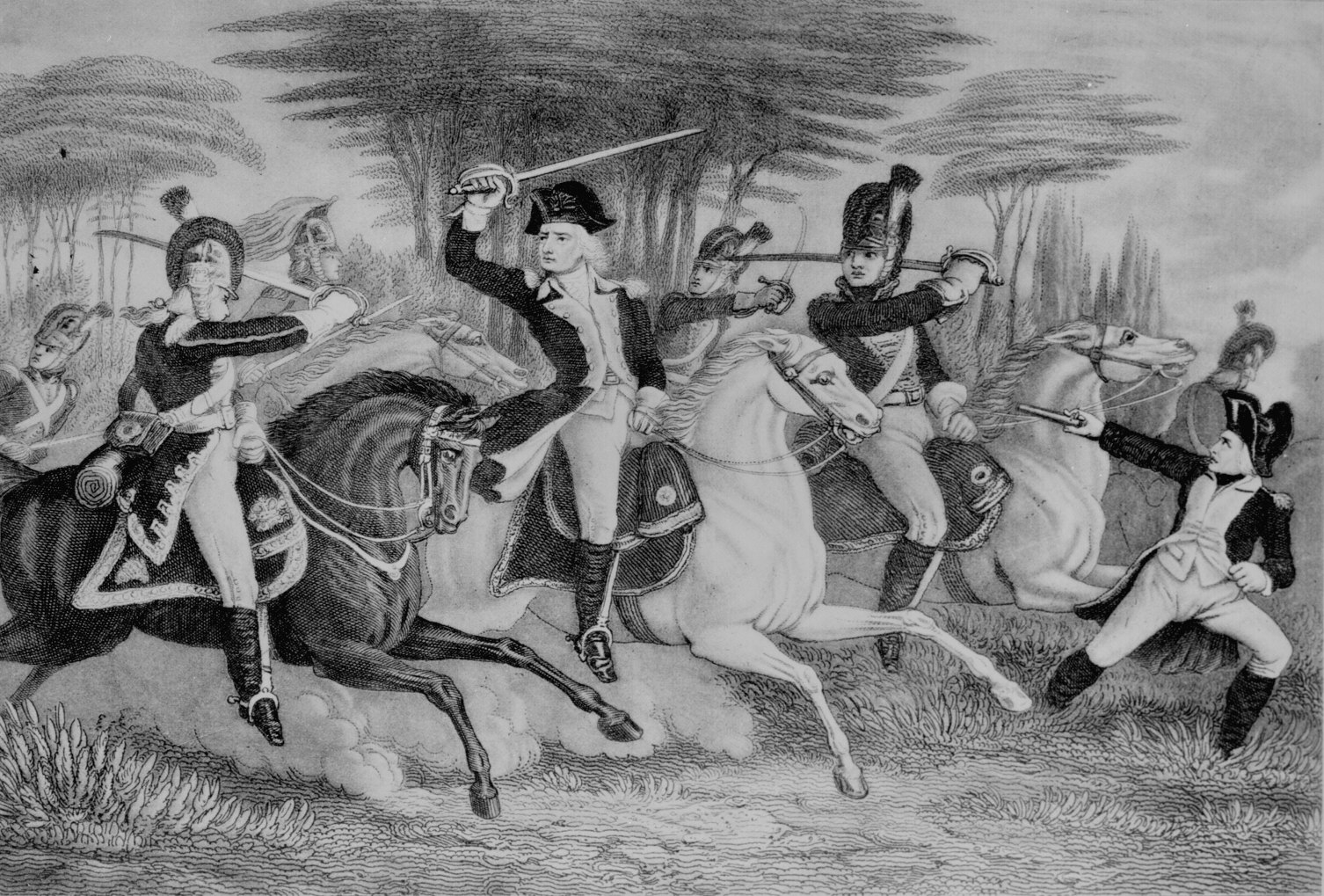
William Washington at the Battle of Cowpens

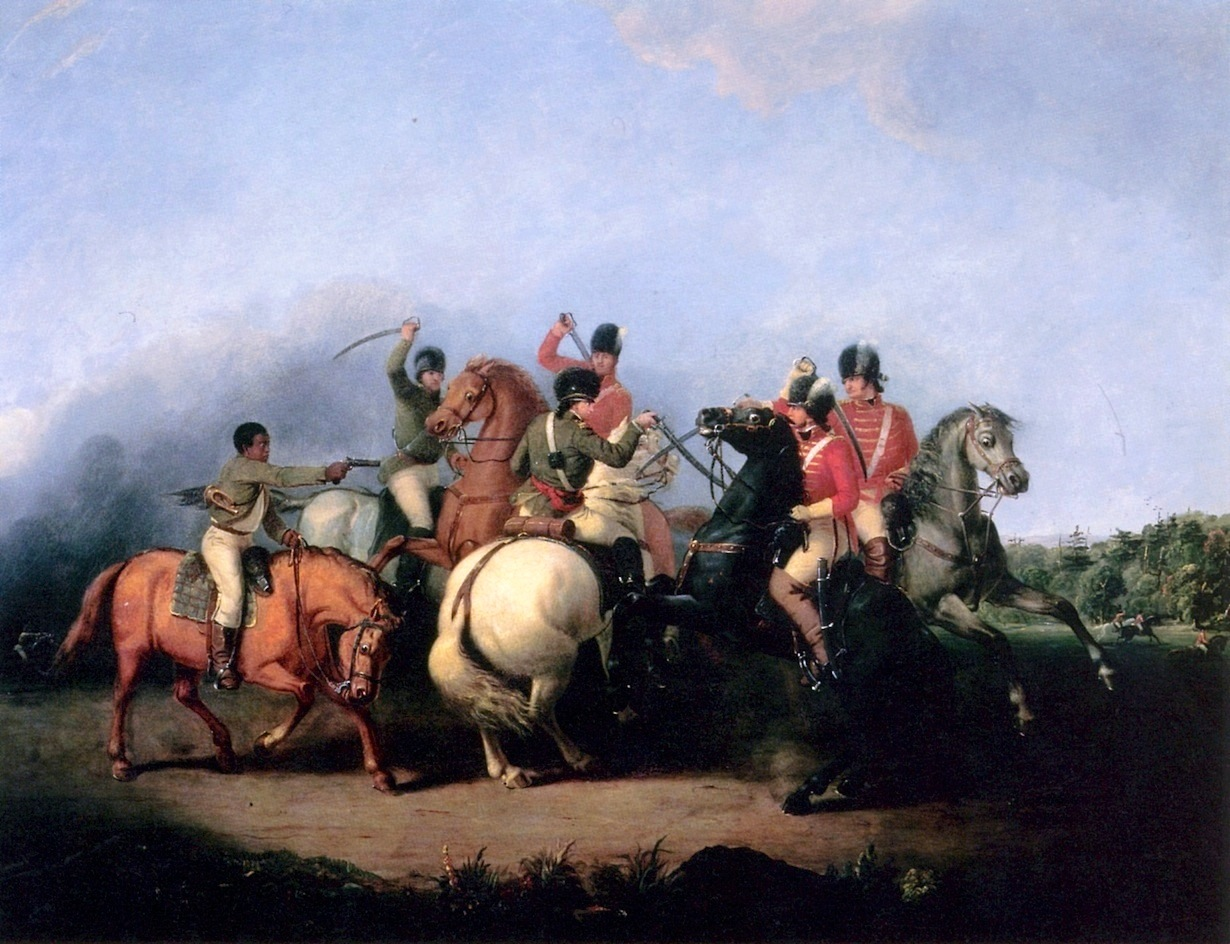
The Battle of Cowpens, painted by William Ranney in 1845. The scene depicts an unnamed black soldier (left) firing his pistol and saving the life of Colonel William Washington (on white horse in center).

These successes led to Tarleton being ordered by Lord Cornwallis to chase down Morgan's "flying corps", leading to the Battle of Cowpens on January 17, 1781. Morgan's battle plans called for Washington's group, 80 Continental dragoons and 45 mounted Georgia infantry, to serve as a defensive and offensive unit as the situation required. Washington's first encounter with the enemy involved the rescue of a South Carolina militia unit as it was reloading behind the front lines of Morgan's left flank and under attack by a unit of Tarleton's dragoons. Crushing the attackers, Washington regrouped and followed with an attack on Tarleton's left flank infantry. After repeated assaults by Washington, they moved through the infantry and attacked a small artillery position behind Tarleton's front lines.

With the main British infantry surrender and during Tarleton's retreat, Washington was in close pursuit and found himself somewhat isolated. He was attacked by the British commander and two of his men. Tarleton was stopped by Washington himself, who attacked him with his sword, calling out, "Where is now the boasting Tarleton?" A cornet of the 17th, Thomas Patterson, rode up to strike Washington but was shot by Washington's enslaved orderly trumpeter. Washington survived this assault and in the process wounded Tarleton's right hand with a sabre blow, while Tarleton creased Washington's knee with a pistol shot that also wounded his horse. Washington pursued Tarleton for sixteen miles, but gave up the chase when he came to the plantation of Adam Goudylock near Thicketty Creek. To escape capture by Washington, Tarleton had forced Goudylock to serve as an escape guide. For his valor at Cowpens, Washington received a silver medal awarded by the Continental Congress executed under the direction of Thomas Jefferson. The unique silver medal was designed by French artists Du Pre and De Vivier. (A British version of this duel can be found under Chapter 33 Year 1781.)

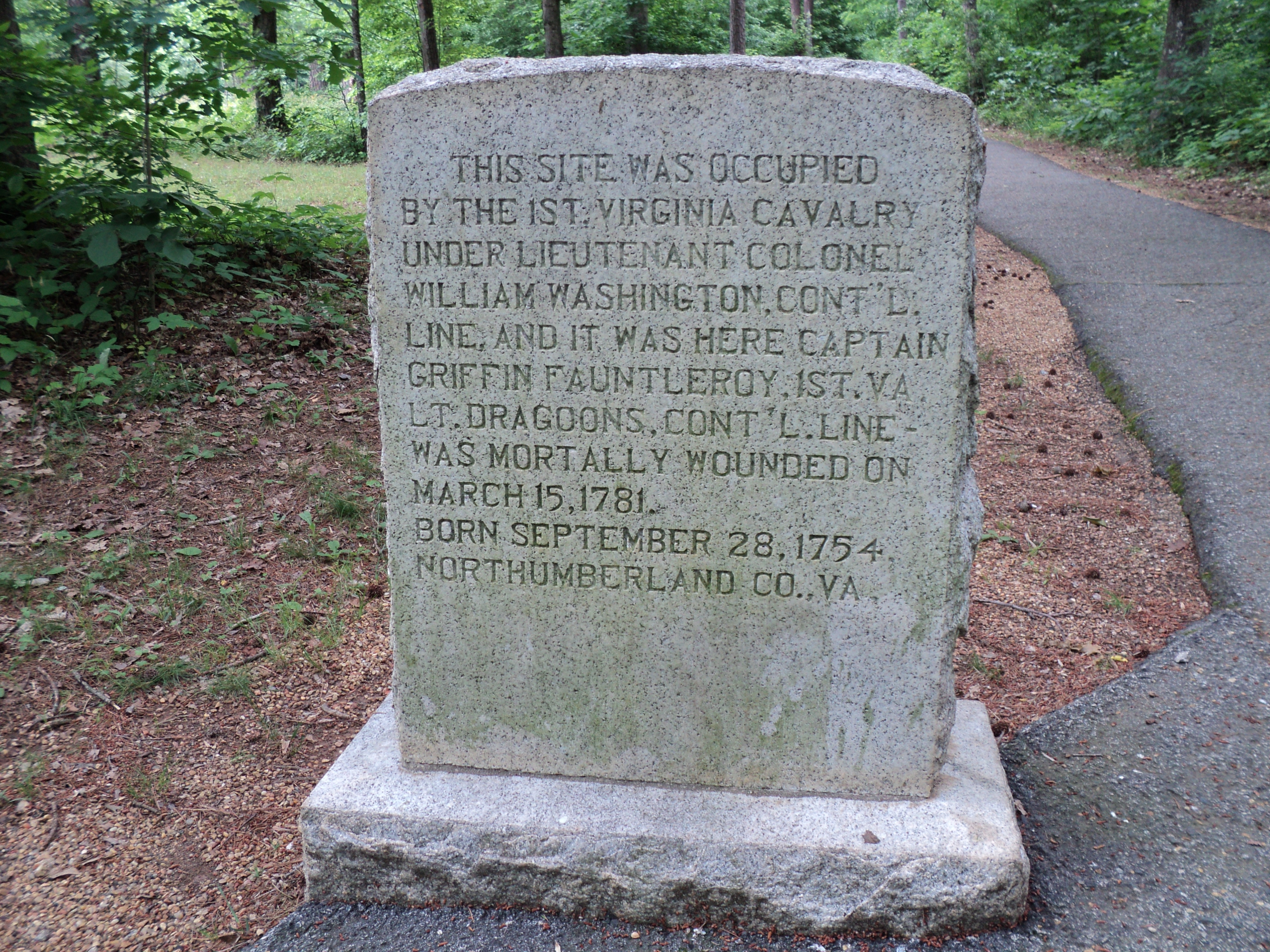
Monument to 1st Virginia Cavalry, under command of Lieut. Col. William Washington, Guilford Courthouse National Military Park, present-day Greensboro, North Carolina

After the Battle of Cowpens, Washington's dragoons assisted the retreat of General Nathanael Greene to Dan River in Virginia by rearguard actions against forces commanded by Lord Cornwallis. Afterward, Washington returned to North Carolina to act as vanguard for Greene's army.

On March 15, 1781, Greene and Washington fought against Cornwallis and Tarleton at the Battle of Guilford Courthouse. The Americans were driven from the field, but about one quarter of Cornwallis' men were killed or wounded, an unsustainable loss. This forced Cornwallis to move his main army to the coast to regroup.

On April 25, 1781, at the Battle of Hobkirk's Hill, Greene was attacked by British colonel Lord Rawdon. Ordered to attack Rawdon's flank, Washington was unable to complete the maneuver while policing prisoners, forcing Greene to retreat.

On September 8, 1781, the Battle of Eutaw Springs, the last major battle in the Carolinas, was Washington's final action. Midway through the battle, Greene ordered Washington to charge a portion of the British line positioned in a blackjack thicket along Eutaw Creek. The thicket proved impenetrable and British fire repulsed the mounted charges. During the last charge, Washington's mount was shot out from under him, and he was pinned beneath his horse. He was bayoneted and taken prisoner, and held under house arrest in the Charleston area for the remainder of the war.

The British commander in the South, Lord Cornwallis, would later comment that "there could be no more formidable antagonist in a charge, at the head of his cavalry, than Colonel William Washington."

== South Carolina planter and legislator ==
On April 21, 1782, Washington married Jane Riley Elliott of Sandy Hill plantation in Charleston County, South Carolina. They first met when she made his regiment a battle flag that was carried into combat from Cowpens to Eutaw Springs. After the war, the married couple settled on Sandy Hill plantation, which was 28 miles upriver from the port at Charleston, South Carolina and which Jane Elliott owned before their marriage. On 27 December 1785, the new couple purchased a townhouse at 8 South Battery in Charleston. Washington also ownered other properties in Charleston County's St. Paul Parish.

Washington farmed as a low-country planter using enslaved labor, as well as raised thoroughbred horses. In the 1800 federal census, Washington owned eighteen enslaved people in Charleston, and possibly was the nonresident planter of the same name who owned five slaves in the state's western region being settled by revolutionary veterans using land grants issued for their service. Washington won election to the State legislature from 1787 to 1804 but refused to run for State Governor because he, in his words, "was not born a Carolinian." Washington also accepted a post of brigadier general commanding the Seventh Brigade of the South Carolina State Militia in 1794.

During the naval war with France in 1798 former president George Washington was appointed by President Adams' Administration as commander of the American Army. George Washington offered a general's commission and staff position to William Washington, and he accepted the rank of brigadier general and served on George Washington's staff. He served the United States Army from 1798 to 1800, and concerned himself with the defenses of South Carolina and Georgia.

== Death ==
After a lingering illness, William Washington died on March 6, 1810, at the age of 58. He was buried at Live Oak, a plantation near Sandy Hill. He was survived by his wife, a son, and a daughter. His daughter was married to General Alexander Spotswood, a grandson of Virginia Governor Alexander Spotswood.
