= Battle of Camden =

1780 battle of the American Revolutionary War

- Part of the Southern theater of the American Revolutionary War
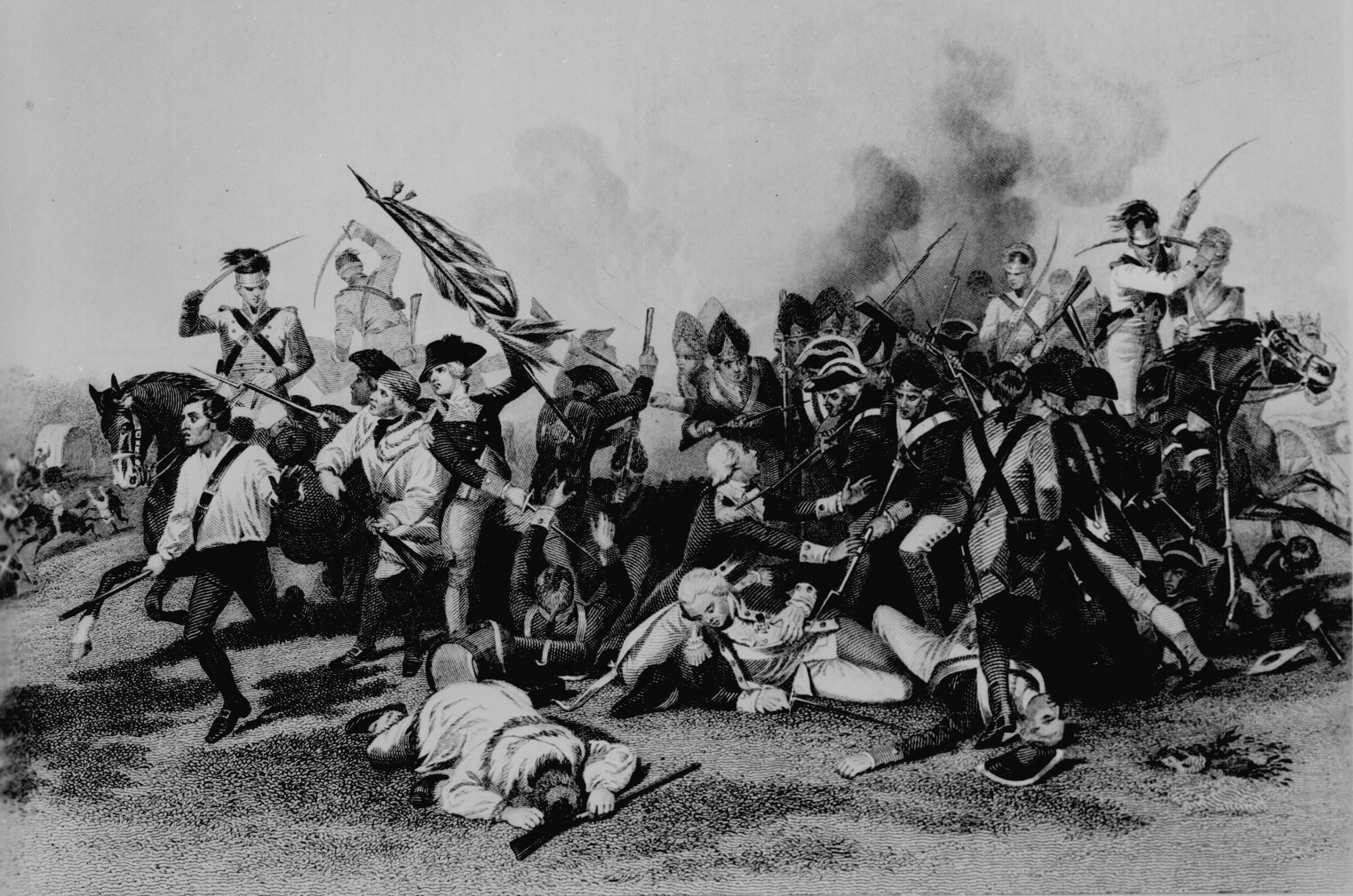
- Engraving of the battle
Date	August 16, 1780
Location	Near Camden, South Carolina 34°21′52.39″N 80°36′50.04″W
Result	British victory

Belligerents
Great Britain	United States

Commanders and leaders
Lord Cornwallis; Lord Rawdon	Horatio Gates; Johann de Kalb (DOW); Marquis de La Rouërie

Strength
1,500 regulars 600 militia 4 guns	1,500 regulars 2,500 militia 8 guns

Casualties and losses
68 killed; 245 wounded; 11 missing	900 killed or wounded; 1,000 captured

The Battle of Camden, also known as the Battle of Camden Court House, was fought on August 16, 1780, as part of the Southern theater of the American Revolutionary War. A British army of 2,100 regulars and militia under Lieutenant-general Lord Cornwallis engaged an American army of 4,000 regulars and militia under Major General Horatio Gates four miles north of Camden, South Carolina. The battle resulted in a major British victory, with Cornwallis' force suffering just over 300 casualties while Gates' suffered almost 2,000.

As a result of the battle, Britain's hold on the Carolinas, inaugurated by their earlier capture of Charleston, was further strengthened. Gates never held a field command again, but avoided being investigated or court-martialed due to his political connections. News of the battle was greeted with acclaim among the British and despair among the Americans, while European nations began to doubt the United States' ability to win the war. However, the Americans withdrew into the Southern interior and began engaging in asymmetrical warfare against the British, which ultimately culminated in the decisive American victory at the 1781 Yorktown campaign that ended the war.

== Background ==
Following the British defeat at Saratoga in 1777, and the Battle of Monmouth in 1778, the French entered the American Revolutionary War in June 1778, followed by the Spanish in June 1779. With the war at a stalemate in the north, the British decided to renew their "southern strategy" to win back their rebellious North American colonies. The strategy relied on the Loyalists joining forces with British regulars to roll northward through North Carolina and Virginia, besieging the rebels in the north on all sides. This campaign repeated the successful December 1778 Capture of Savannah, with Sir Henry Clinton's successful Siege of Charleston in May 1780. British forces then campaigned in the Back Country, capturing the key towns of Georgetown, Cheraw, Camden, Ninety Six, and Augusta. Clinton returned to New York on 5 June, after the southern remnants of the Continental Army were defeated in May at the Battle of Waxhaws, tasking Lord Cornwallis with the pacification of the remaining portions of the state.

The Patriot resistance remaining in South Carolina consisted of militia under commanders such as Thomas Sumter, William Davie, and Francis Marion. General George Washington sent Continental Army regiments south, consisting of the Maryland Line and Delaware Line, under the temporary command of Major General Jean, Baron de Kalb. Departing New Jersey on 16 April, they arrived at the Buffalo Ford on the Deep River, 30 miles south of Greensboro, in July. Horatio Gates, the "Hero of Saratoga" arrived in camp on 25 July, to take command. Two days later, Gates ordered his army to take the direct road to Camden, against the advice of his officers, including Otho Holland Williams. Williams noted the country they were marching through "was by nature barren, abounding with sandy plains, intersected by swamps, and very thinly inhabited," and what few inhabitants they might come across were most likely hostile. All of the troops had been short of food since arrival at the Deep River.

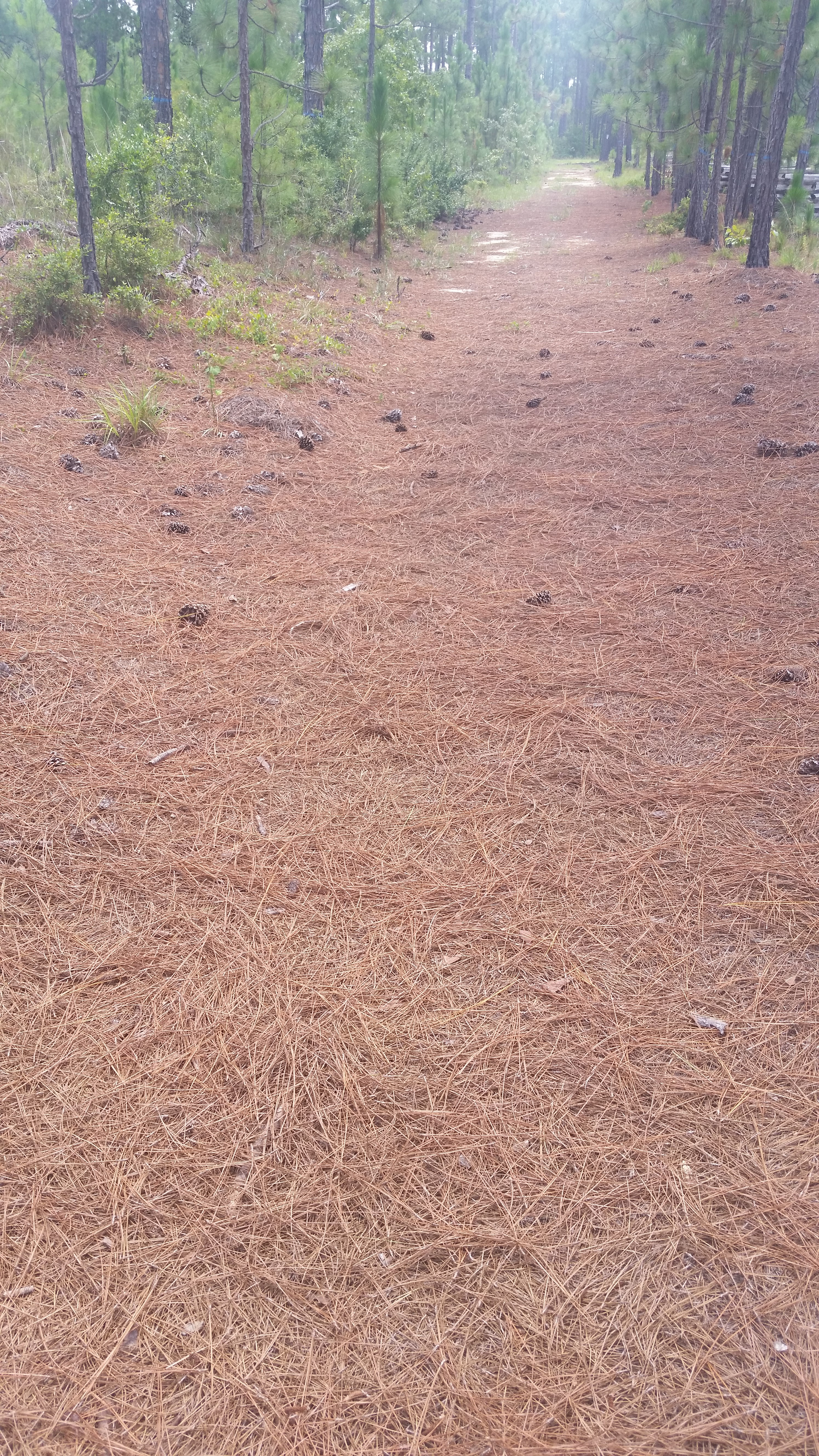
The Great Wagon Road, along which advance forces of both armies met on the night before the battle

On 7 August, Gates was joined by 2,100 North Carolina militiamen under the command of General Richard Caswell. At Rugeley's Mill, 15 miles north of Camden, 700 Virginia Militia under the command of General Edward Stevens joined Gates' "Grand Army". In addition, Gates had Armand's Legion. However, at this stage, Gates no longer had the help of Marion's or Sumter's men, and in fact had sent 400 of his Continentals to help Sumter with a planned attack on a British supply convoy. Gates also refused the help of Lieutenant Colonel William Washington's cavalry. Apparently Gates planned on building defensive works 5.5 miles north of Camden in an effort to force British abandonment of that important town. Gates told his aide Thomas Pinckney he had no intention of attacking the British with an army consisting mostly of militia.

Camden was garrisoned by about 1,000 men under Lord Rawdon. General Cornwallis, alerted to Gates' movement on August 9, marched from Charleston with reinforcements, arriving at Camden on August 13, increasing the effective British troop strength to 2,239 men. Gates ordered a night march to commence at 10:00 p.m. on 15th Aug., despite his army of 3,052, of which two-thirds were militia, having never maneuvered together. Unfortunately, their evening meal acted as a purgative while they marched, with Armand's horse in the lead. On a collision course was Cornwallis' army, also on a 10:00 p.m. night march, with Tarleton's dragoons in the lead. A short period of confusion ensued when the two forces collided around 2:00 a.m., but both sides soon separated, not wanting a night battle.

== Deployments ==
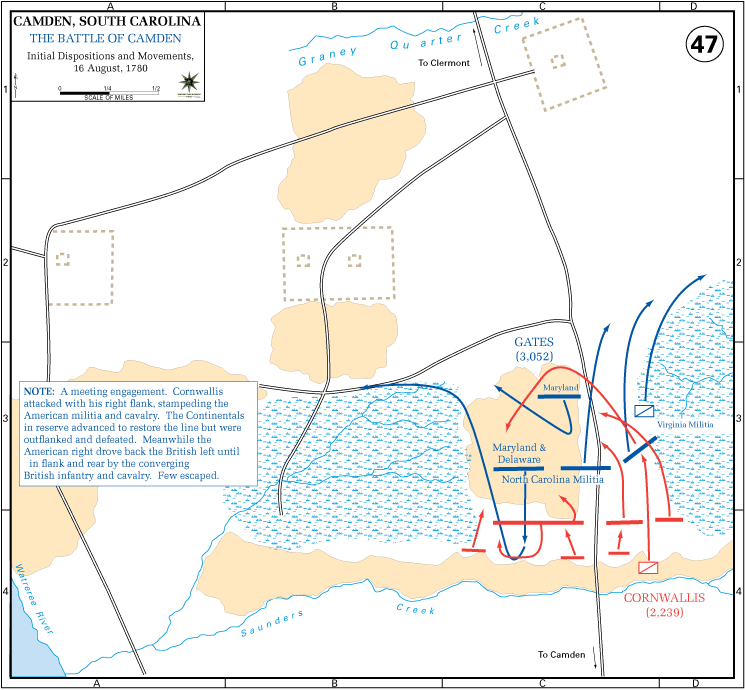
Initial dispositions and movements at the battle

Gates formed up before first light. On his right flank he placed Mordecai Gist's 2nd Maryland Brigade (three regiments) and the Delaware Regiment, with Baron de Kalb in overall command of the right wing. On his left flank, he placed Caswell's 1,800 North Carolina militia; to the left of them were Stevens' 700 Virginians, and behind the Virginians were 120 men of Armand's Legion. Gates and staff stayed behind the reserve force, Major General William Smallwood's 1st Maryland Regiment, about 200 yards behind the battle line. Thus, the total number of Continentals on the field numbered 900. Gates placed seven guns along the line, manned by about 100 men. Also present, but whose disposition was unknown, were 70 mounted volunteer South Carolinians. Gates' formation, though a typical British practice of the time, placed his weakest troops against the most experienced British regiments, while his best troops would face only the weaker elements of the British forces.

Cornwallis had roughly 2,239 men, including Loyalist militia and Volunteers of Ireland. Cornwallis also had the highly experienced Tarleton's Legion, who were formidable in a pursuit situation. Cornwallis formed his army into two brigades. On the right was Lt. Col James Webster, facing the inexperienced militia with the 23rd Royal Welch Fusiliers and the 33rd Regiment of Foot. Lord Rawdon was in command of the left, facing the Continental Infantry with the Irish Volunteers, Banastre Tarleton's infantry and the Loyalist troops. In reserve, Cornwallis had two battalions of the 71st Regiment of Foot and Tarleton's cavalry force. He also placed four guns in the British center. As Gates had done, Cornwallis placed his more experienced units on the right flank, and his less experienced units on the left flank.

== Battle ==
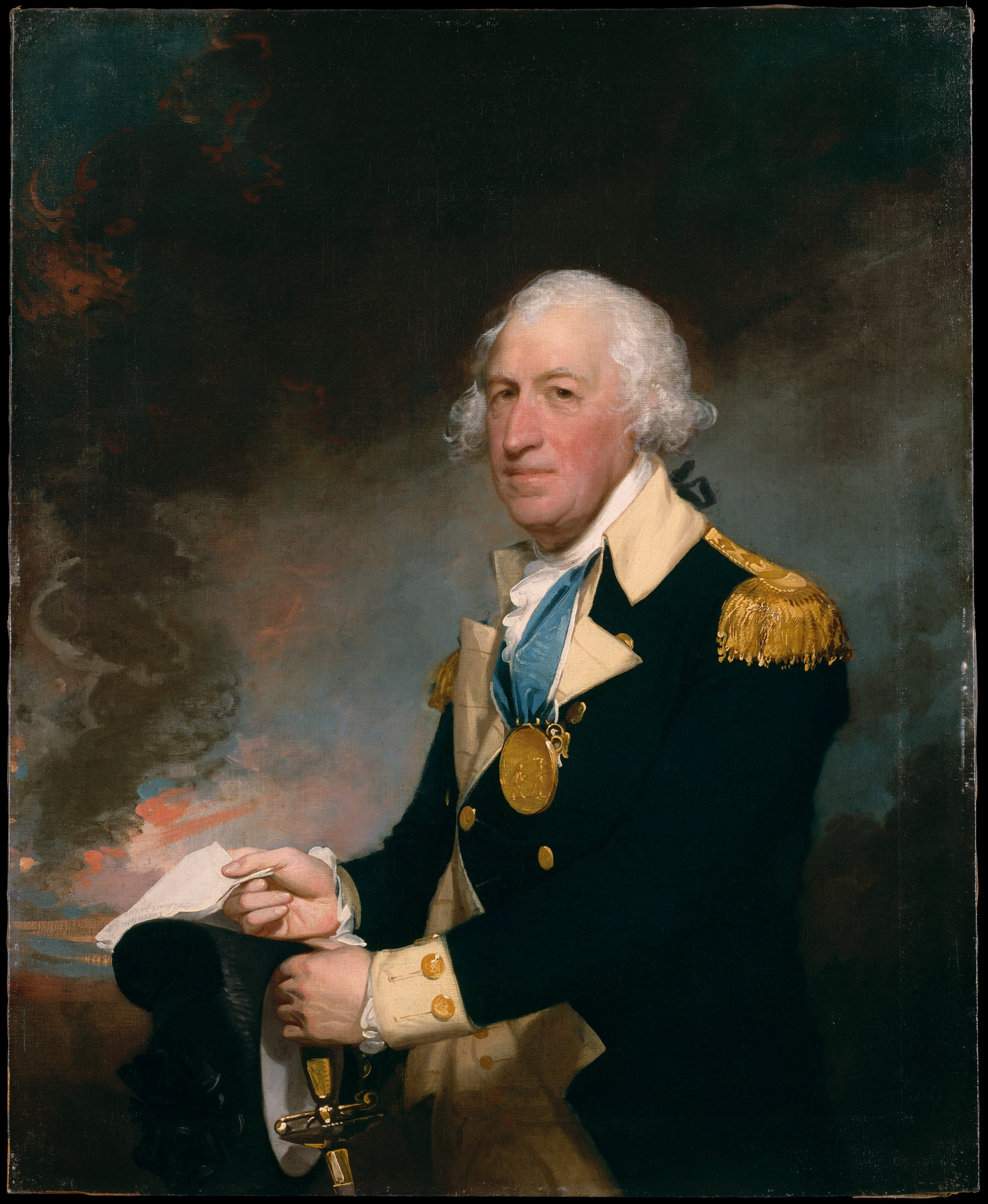
Portrait of Horatio Gates by Gilbert Stuart, 1794

Gates ordered Stevens and de Kalb to attack, while Cornwallis issued the same order to Webster. Webster's First Brigade consisting of 530 men of the 23rd and 33rd Regiments of Foot advanced with bayonets towards the 2,500 soldiers in the Virginia and North Carolina militia. The militia, however, had never used bayonets before. The American left wing collapsed as the Virginians and then the North Carolinians fled. The Virginians fled so fast that they suffered only three wounded. The North Carolinians fled all the way back to Hillsborough, North Carolina.

According to Williams, referring to the British charge, "the impetuosity with which they advanced, firing and huzzaing, threw the whole body of militia into such a panic that they generally threw down their loaded arms and fled in the utmost consternation. The unworthy example of the Virginians was almost instantly followed by the North Carolinians."

Furthermore, in a letter to Thomas Jefferson, then governor of Virginia, "picture it as bad as you possibly can and it will not be as bad as it really is."

A member of the North Carolina militia, Garret Watts, later confessed, "It was instantaneous. There was no effort to rally, no encouragement to fight. Officers and men joined in the flight. I threw away my gun..."

Rawdon's troops advanced in two charges, but heavy fire repulsed his regiments. The Continental troops then launched a counterattack which came close to breaking Rawdon's line, which began to falter. Cornwallis rode to his left flank and steadied Rawdon's men. Instead of pursuing the fleeing militia, Webster wheeled to the left, into the Continentals. One of the North Carolina militia brigades that had been stationed next to the Delaware Line held its ground, the only militia unit to do so.

De Kalb called up the reserve 1st Maryland Brigade to support the 2nd, but they could get no closer than several hundred feet. However, as Lt. Col. Benjamin Ford of the 6th Maryland Regiment stated to Williams' entreaties, "We are outnumbered and outflanked. See the enemy charge with bayonets." With the British closing in on three sides, Cornwallis ordered Tarleton's cavalry to charge into the rear of the Continental line. The cavalry charge broke up the formation of the Continental troops, who finally broke and fled. However, Gist was able to move 100 Continentals in good order through a swamp, where the cavalry could not follow. Additionally, about 50 to 60 Maryland Line Continentals, under the leadership of Maj. Archibald Anderson, Lt. Col. John Eager Howard, and Capt. Robert Kirkwood, were able to retreat in good order.

According to Tarleton, "rout and slaughter ensued in every quarter."

De Kalb, attempting to rally his men, was unhorsed, and would die of his numerous wounds (11 in total; 8 by bayonet and 3 by musket balls) two days later as a British prisoner. After just one hour of combat, the American troops had been utterly defeated, suffering over 2,000 casualties. Tarleton's cavalry pursued and harried the retreating Continental troops for some 22 miles (35 km) before drawing rein. By that evening, Gates, mounted on a swift horse, had taken refuge 60 miles (97 km) away in Charlotte, North Carolina.

According to Charles Stedman, one of Cornwallis' officers. "The road for some miles was strewn with the wounded and killed who had been overtaken by the legion in their pursuit. The numbers of dead horses, broken wagons, and baggage scattered on the road formed a perfect scene of horror and confusion: Arms, knapsacks, and accoutrements found were innumerable; such was the terror and dismay of the Americans."

== Casualties ==
The British casualties were 69 killed, 245 wounded and 11 missing. Hugh Rankin says, "of the known dead, 162 were Continentals, 12 were South Carolina militiamen, 3 were Virginia militiamen and 63 were North Carolina militiamen". David Ramsay says, "290 American wounded prisoners were carried into Camden after this action. Of this number, 206 were Continentals, 82 were North Carolina militia and 2 were Virginia militia. The resistance made by each corps may in some degree be estimated from the number of wounded. The Americans lost the whole of their artillery – 8 field pieces, upwards of 200 wagons and the greatest part of their baggage." A letter from Cornwallis to Lord George Germain, dated 21 August 1780, says that his army took "about one thousand Prisoners, many of whom wounded" on August 18.

Of 48 Continental officers at Camden: 5 were killed, 4 died of wounds, 4 were wounded without being captured, 11 were wounded and captured and 24 were captured without being wounded. One of the wounded Americans that was captured was Captain Richard Dorsey of the 1st Maryland Artillery who received eleven wounds. Dorsey had become a captain of an independent company of Maryland artillery in May 1778. Dorsey's artillery company was taken into the 1st Continental Artillery Regiment in late May 1778, and Dorsey was captured at the Battle of Camden. These ratios would suggest that many of the Americans wounded in the battle escaped capture.

== Analysis ==
There are many reasons given for Gates' defeat. The most prominent are the following:

=== Tactical evaluation ===
Gates, as a former British officer, was accustomed to the traditional deployment of the army's most experienced regiments on the place of honor, the right flank of the battle line. He therefore placed his Continental regiments on the line's right flank, while the masses of militia which had joined him, most of whom were Virginians that had never fought in a battle, were placed on the left flank, where they faced the most experienced British regiments. Gates was also too far behind his troops to observe the battle or communicate orders to them effectively. Tarleton believed Gates made four errors, including not taking a stronger position on Saunders' Creek before Cornwallis' army arrived, moving his troops at night, the placement of his militia, and the adjustment of Gates' disposition just before battle.

=== Strategic evaluation ===
Aside from tactics on the battlefield, Gates had made several strategic errors before joining the battle:

- His aggressive movement brought his forces deep into heavily Loyalist areas, where local residents would neither provide supplies nor join his army.
- Stretched far from their supply lines, Gates' troops were weakened by a lack of adequate foodstuffs, with many of them suffering from diarrhea.
- Gates took great confidence in his victory at Saratoga but erred in mapping the inexperience of Burgoyne onto Cornwallis, who was a gifted strategist.

== Aftermath ==
Gates proceeded onwards to Hillsborough to seek assistance from the North Carolina General Assembly, which was meeting there. Travelling 180 miles in three days, he arrived at Hillsborough on August 19 and composed his report to Congress the next day. Gates' report, addressed to President of the Continental Congress Samuel Huntington, began: "In deepest Distress and Anxiety of Mind, I am obliged to acquaint your Excellency with the Total Defeat of the Troops under my Command." In a letter Gates sent to George Washington on 30 August, he wrote:

But if being unfortunate is solely a Reason sufficient for removing me from Command I shall most cheerfully submit to the Orders of Congress; and resign an office few Generals would be anxious to possess...

News of the battle was met with despair among Americans, as it had dashed their hopes for a swift recapture of British-held areas in the South. William Dobein James, a soldier who served in Brigadier General Francis Marion's partisan corps, wrote after the war that "no event which had yet happened, was considered so calamitous." George Washington noted that "the stroke is severe" and it would be a struggle to rebuild the southern army while New York Congressman James Duane lamented "so deplorable a catastrophe." Gates' strategic and tactical decisions, including his rapid advance into South Carolina, choice of route, and deployment of militia at the battle were widely condemned. Combined with his journey to Hillsborough, which Alexander Hamilton denounced as "so precipitate a flight", Congress removed Gates from command of the southern army in October. Being the southern army's highest-ranking officer after the battle, Smallwood expected to succeed Gates, but when inquiries were made about his role at Camden no American troops recalled seeing him after he ordered his brigade to advance, which ended the possibility of Smallwood taking command.

George Washington replaced Gates with Major General Nathanael Greene, who arrived to take command of the southern army in December, by which time Gates had significantly rebuilt it by raising a light infantry corps, inspiring large number of Southern Patriots to return to the field as partisans, and convincing Congress to bring Daniel Morgan out of retirement and take command of the light infantry corps as brigadier general. After learning of Greene's appointment, Smallwood left the southern army and returned to Maryland to oversee recruitment efforts. Congress had ordered Greene to hold a court of inquiry to judge Gates' conduct, and though the two men had a poor relationship Greene declined to try Gates after witnessing the battlefield, declaring that he did not find find fault in Gates' tactical decisions and would have personally fought the battle in the same way. The official excuse Greene cited was a lack of sufficient numbers of high-ranking officers to convene a court of inquiry. The two men opened a correspondence following Greene's defeat near Camden at Hobkirk's Hill on April 25, 1781, "commiserating in the failures both had suffered in the same area."

De Kalb emerged from the battle as an American hero, with his death preventing questions being raised over his failure to maintain command over the 1st Maryland Brigade. American historian Jim Piecuch has defended Gates, noting that he had been marching towards Camden to unite with Caswell's militia force which was in danger of being surrounded and destroyed by British forces after Caswell ignored orders from de Kalb and Gates to unite with them. Piecuch also noted that Gates' rapid advance prevented Cornwallis' army from consolidating their positions and organizing Loyalist forces while concomitantly raising the morale of South Carolina Patriots and putting Gates' army in a position where it could assist partisans under Marion and Sumter. Regarding Gates' deployment of his militia units, Piecuch observed that "they would have fared no better had they been posted on the left flank, where the British fought the best of the Continentals to a standstill and certainly would have routed the militia."

In contrast to American reactions, the British reaction to the battle was one of jubilation. Public support in Britain for the war soared, with numerous predictions of imminent victory being made; Secretary of State for the Colonies Lord Germain, who was responsible for directing the British war effort, declared that the battle had guaranteed Britain's hold over Georgia and South Carolina, while George III stated that Cornwallis' defeat of a significantly larger American army "distinguished this victory from all that have been achieved since the commencement of the rebellion". Cornwallis, Rawdon, Tarleton, and Webster were all lavished with praise for their role in the victory, which British troops and Loyalists in New York City and Charleston celebrated with toasts and gun salutes.

Gates and the rest of the southern army was ridiculed, with one Loyalist newspaper claiming Gates hid in a cellar to escape pursuing British cavalry and another asserting that he had been arrested for misconduct. One newspaper published a joke return notice which offered a reward of millions in Continental currency for information leading to the recovery of "a whole army, consisting of horse, foot, and dragoons, with all their baggage, artillery, wagons, and camp equipage" which was reported to have last been seen near Camden; the notice claimed that there were suspicions "that a certain Charles Earl Cornwallis was principally concerned in carrying off the said army" and stated that no reward would be paid for the return of the American militia as it was "useless in battle". In Continental Europe, the battle led to the United States' French allies to doubt the Americans' ability to hold the South or even win the war. In Amsterdam, John Adams had nearly finalized a loan from the Dutch government to Congress when the Dutch learned of the battle and decided not to make the loan.

Following the battle, Morgan revised the southern army's use of militia and won a decisive victory at the Battle of Cowpens on January 17, 1781. As his victory at Camden led Cornwallis to confirm his belief that the war could won solely by British and Loyalist regulars carrying out frontal assaults against American troops, he neglected the Loyalist militia, which played a role in the decisive Loyalist defeat at the Battle of Kings Mountain on October 7, 1780. At the Battle of Guildford Court House in March 15, 1781, Cornwallis won a tactical victory against Greene but suffered heavy casualties, which led the British general to march to Virginia and unite with a larger army there, ultimately resulting in the decisive Franco-American victory in the Yorktown campaign that led to Britain agreeing to recognize American independence.

== Legacy ==
The Camden Battlefield is located about 5.5 miles (8.9 km) north of Camden. Approximately 479 acres of the core of the battlefield is owned by the Palmetto Conservation Foundation, and is undergoing preservation in private-public partnership. The original five acres were owned by the Hobkirk Chapter of the Daughters of the American Revolution who gave their portion over to the current owners. The American Battlefield Trust and its partners have acquired and preserved more than 294 acres of the battlefield as of mid-2023. The site was declared a National Historic Landmark in 1961, and placed on the National Register of Historic Places in 1966.

Aspects of the battle were included in the 2000 movie The Patriot, in which Ben and Gabriel Martin are seen watching a similar battle. Ben comments at the stupidity of Gates fighting "muzzle to muzzle with Redcoats". The film is not historically accurate, depicting too many Continental troops relative to the number of militia, and showing the Continentals and militia retreating at the same time.

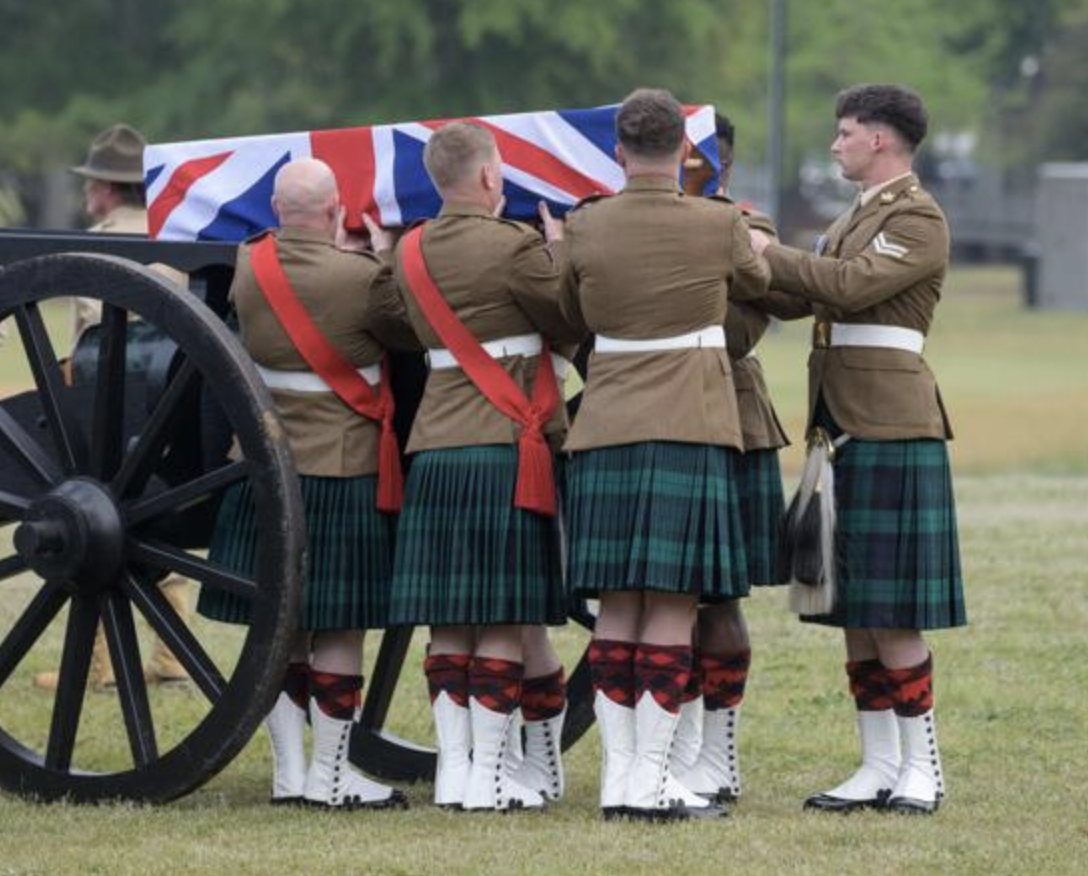
Reburial service in Camden of a British soldier whose remains were discovered in 2022.

In 2022, the remains of fourteen troops who died during the battle were discovered in shallow graves, twelve of whom were Continental Army soldiers, one being a soldier from the British Army's 71st Regiment of Foot, and one being determined to be Native American. All of the 'Camden Fourteen' were subsequently reburied in 2024 after an April 22, 2023 funeral with full military honors. The Royal Highland Fusiliers of the British army took part in the funeral. The US Air Force 79th Fighter Squadron from the Shaw Air Force Base performed a flyover to honor the men.

The first of the fourteen soldiers discovered was identified in 2026, using DNA from a tiny piece of his skull. Private John Pumphrey was a teenaged member of the Maryland 7th Regiment.

== Order of battle ==
=== British and Loyalists ===
The British and loyalist order of battle was as follows:

Overall Command: Lt. Gen. Lord Cornwallis

Right Brigade:

Commanding Officer: Lt. Col. James Webster

- 23rd Regiment of Foot
- 33rd Regiment of Foot
- 2 guns

Left Brigade:

Commanding Officer: Col. Lord Rawdon

- 2nd American Regiment
- Infantry, British Legion
- John Hamilton's Royal North Carolina Regiment
- Samuel Bryan's North Carolina Volunteers (Loyalist militia)
- 2 guns

Reserves:

- 71st Regiment of Foot: Lt. Col. Alexander McDonald
- Dragoons, British Legion: Lt. Col. Banastre Tarleton

=== Patriots ===
The Patriots' order of battle consisted of 4,100 soldiers:

Overall Command: Maj. Gen. Horatio Gates

Right Flank:

Commanding Officer: Brig. Gen. Mordecai Gist

- 2nd Maryland Regiment
- 1st Delaware Regiment
- 3 guns

Center:

Commanding Officer: Brig. Gen. Richard Caswell

- North Carolina state militia (Hillsborough District Brigade, Salisbury District Brigade, Edenton District Brigade, Halifax District Brigade, New Bern District Brigade, Wilmington District Brigade
- 2 guns

Left Flank:

Commanding Officer: Brig. Gen. Edward Stevens

- Virginia Militia
- Armand's Legion

Reserve:

Commanding Officer: Brig. Gen. William Smallwood

- 1st Maryland Regiment
- 2 guns

== See also ==
- American Revolutionary War § War in the South. Places ' Battle of Camden ' in overall sequence and strategic context.

== Bibliography ==
- Boatner, Mark Mayo, Cassell's Biographical Dictionary of the American War of Independence, 1763–1783, Cassell and Company Ltd., London, 1966. ISBN 0-304-29296-6
- Buchanan, John, The Road to Guilford Courthouse: The Revolution In The Carolinas. 1997, John Wiley and Sons, ISBN 0-471-32716-6
- Ramsay, David, The History of the American Revolution, Liberty Fund, Indianapolis, 1990 (first published 1789), Volume II
- Rankin, Hugh F. (1971). The North Carolina Continentals. Chapel Hill: The University of North Carolina Press. ISBN 0-8078-1154-8.
- Russell, David Lee The American Revolution in the Southern Colonies 2000.
- Ward, Christopher War of the Revolution 2 Volumes, MacMillan, New York, 1952
