= Battle of Monck's Corner =

1780 battle

- Part of the American Revolutionary War
Date	April 14, 1780
Location	Moncks Corner, South Carolina 33°11′48″N 80°0′24″W
Result	British victory

Belligerents
Great Britain: (Kingdom of Great Britain) Loyalists	United States

Commanders and leaders
(Kingdom of Great Britain) Banastre Tarleton; James Webster; Patrick Ferguson	(United States) Isaac Huger; William Washington

Strength
1,400	500

Casualties and losses
3 wounded	20 killed or wounded, 67 captured

The Battle of Monck's Corner was fought on April 14, 1780, outside of Charleston, South Carolina, which was under siege by British forces under the command of General Sir Henry Clinton in the American Revolutionary War. The British Legion, under the command of Lieutenant Colonel Banastre Tarleton, surprised a Patriot force stationed at Monck's Corner and drove them away. The action cut off an avenue of escape for Benjamin Lincoln's besieged army. Aside from the British Legion, and the 33rd Foot and 64th Foot led by Lieutenant Colonel James Webster, the force included the American Volunteers led by Major Patrick Ferguson.

== Background ==
The majority of the British soldiers who took part in the Battle of Monck's Corner were Loyalist troops raised from the colony of South Carolina, although a detachment of the 17th Light Dragoons under Captain William Henry Talbotwith also participated. Tarleton's unit was known as the British Legion, under the command of Lieutenant Colonel Banastre Tarleton. General Sir Henry Clinton arrived before Charleston, South Carolina on 1 April 1780 and began siege preparations as the opening move in British plan to gain control over the Carolinas. The city was defended by Continental Army troops under the command of General Benjamin Lincoln. Even after the British operations were underway, troops continued to arrive in the city to assist in its defense. On 8 April, after the British had begun establishing siege lines around part of the city, 750 Virginia Continentals, under the command of William Woodford, arrived in the city.

Clinton learned that a supply train, which was actually the baggage train of this company, was nearing the city and decided to cut the supply route. He detached 1,400 men under Lieutenant Colonel James Webster to go inland about 30 miles (48 km) to Biggin's Bridge on the Cooper River to intercept the train.

In order to protect their own lines, the British needed to face General Isaac Huger and his detachment that Lincoln had stationed at Monck's Corner. Huger's force consisted of 500 men, including cavalry under the command of Lt. Col. William Washington, and elements of Pulaski's Legion under the command of Chevalier Pierre-Francois Vernier. On the evening of 13 April, Tarleton intercepted a letter from Huger meant for Lincoln and learned the disposition of Huger's force. His march continued on in silence.

== Battle ==
The British attacked at 3 am on 14 April. What followed quickly became a rout.

According to Tarleton, "The Americans were completely surprised, General Huger, Colonels Washington and Jamieson, with many officers and men, fled on foot to the swamps.."

American casualties included 14 killed, 19 wounded and 64 captured. The biggest prize was the capture of the horses belonging to the American officers and cavalry.

== Aftermath ==
Tarleton's reputation for swift surprise attacks began with this major victory in the South. Some of the scattered remnants of Huger's force made their way north and east. They eventually regrouped under Colonel Anthony Walton White but were again scattered by Tarleton at Lenud's Ferry on 6 May. Lincoln was forced to surrender Charleston and more than 5,000 Continental Army troops on 12 May. It was the worst American loss of the war. The United States Army did not suffer a loss of similar size until the Battle of Harper's Ferry during the American Civil War.

== Sources ==
- Ward, Christopher. The War of the Revolution. 1952.
- Wilson, David. The Southern Strategy. University of South Carolina Press. 2005.
