= List of British units in the American Revolutionary War =

This is a list of British units in American Revolutionary War which took part in the conflict, fighting against the American rebels and their French, Spanish and Dutch allies in the Americas, Europe and Asia. In addition to the British Army, the list includes German auxiliary units along with provincial and irregular units formed raised in North America and the West Indies. No battle honours were ever awarded to British regiments who fought in America as it was seen by the British to be a civil war. Four battle honours were, however, awarded for actions against the French and Spanish in the West Indies and other theatres.

Of the British Army regiments raised during the war, primarily for military service in North America or the Caribbean, only three, the 23rd Light Dragoons and the 73rd and 78th Foot, survived the post-war reductions in the Army. The 23rd Light Dragoons (later the 19th Light Dragoons) served in India until 1806; the 73rd (renumbered 71st in 1786) later became part of the Highland Light Infantry while the 78th (renumbered 72nd in 1786) became part of the Seaforth Highlanders (Ross-shire Buffs) in 1881. The newly raised Regiments of Foot (85th, 86th, 87th, 88th, 89th, 90th, 91st, 92nd, 93rd, 94th and 99th) were stationed on garrison duty in the West Indies. All were disbanded at the end of the war.

Infantry units which remained in the British Isles during the war included the: 2nd, 11th, 12th, 25th (at Sussex), 32nd (at Cornwall), 36th (at Herefordshire), 39th (at East Middlesex), 41st, 51st and 81st. The 78th, 83rd and 95th Foot were stationed in Jersey, where they defeated a French invasion of the island in 1781 (the Battle of Jersey). Other regiments were in service in India or Gibraltar.

== British Army units ==
=== Cavalry ===
- 16th (The Queen's) Regiment of (Light) Dragoons
- 17th Regiment of (Light) Dragoons

=== Infantry ===
==== Foot guards ====
- Brigade of Foot Guards (raised from the 1st Regiment of Foot Guards, Coldstream Regiment of Foot Guards and 3rd Regiment of Foot Guards)
  - 1st Battalion
  - 2nd Battalion

See Rg 23, Entry 23 Revolutionary War Collection Greensboro U S Army British Journals located at the United States National Archives, Washington D.C.

==== Regular infantry ====
- 1st (Royal) Regiment of Foot (RF)
- 3rd RF or "Buffs" and "Royal East Kent Regiment"
- 4th (The King's Own) (Lancaster) RF
- 5th RF (Royal Northumberland Fusiliers)
- 6th RF (Royal Warwickshire Regiment)
- 7th RF (Royal Fusiliers)
- 8th (The King's) RF
- 9th RF (East Norfolk Regiment)
- 10th RF (Royal Lincolnshire Regiment)
- 13th RF (Prince Albert's) (Somerset Light Infantry)
- 14th RF (Prince of Wales's Own) (West Yorkshire Regiment)
- 15th RF (Sir William Clifton's Regiment of Foot) (East Yorkshire Regiment)
- 16th RF
- 17th RF
- 18th (or Royal Irish) RF
- 19th RF
- 20th RF
- 21st RF (Royal North British Fusiliers)
- 22nd RF (Cheshire Regiment)
- 23rd RF (Royal Welch Fusiliers)
- 24th RF
- 26th RF
- 27th (Enniskillen) RF
- 28th RF
- 29th RF
- 30th RF
- 31st RF
- 33rd RF
- 34th RF
- 35th RF
- 37th RF
- 38th RF
- 40th RF
- 42nd (Royal Highland) RF
- 43rd RF
- 44th RF
- 45th RF
- 46th RF
- 47th RF
- 48th RF
- 49th RF
- 50th RF
- 52nd RF
- 53rd RF
- 54th RF
- 55th RF
- 57th RF
- 59th RF
- 60th (Royal American) RF
- 62nd RF
- 63rd RF
- 64th RF
- 65th RF
- 69th RF
- 70th RF (Glasgow Lowland)
- 71st RF (Frasers Highlanders)
- 74th Regiment of (Highland) Foot
- 76th RF (Macdonald's Highlanders)
- 79th RF (Royal Liverpool Volunteers)
- 80th RF (Royal Edinburgh Volunteers)
- 82nd RF (1777)
- 83rd RF (Royal Glasgow Volunteers)
- 84th RF (Royal Highland Emigrants) (Loyalist)
- 85th RF (Westminster Volunteers)
- 86th RF (Rutland Regiment)
- 87th RF (1779)
- 88th RF (1779)
- 89th RF (1779)
- 90th RF (Yorkshire Volunteers)
- 91st RF (Shropshire Volunteers)
- 92nd RF (1779)
- 93rd RF (1780)
- 94th RF (1780)
- 99th RF (Jamaica Regiment)

=== American establishment ===
- 1st American Regiment (formerly the Queen's Rangers) (1756–1783)
- 2nd American Regiment (formerly the Volunteers of Ireland, placed on British establishment, in 1782, as 105th Regiment of Foot) (1778-1784)
- 3rd American Regiment (formerly the New York Volunteers) (1776-1783)
- 4th American Regiment (formerly the King's American Regiment, placed on British establishment, in 1782, possibly as the 110th Regiment of Foot) (1776-1783)
- 5th American Regiment (formerly the British Legion, placed on British establishment, in 1782, as Tarleton's Dragoons) (1777-1782)

=== His Majesty's Marine Forces ===
- 1st Battalion
- 2nd Battalion

== Loyalist units ==
=== Provincial Corps ===
- American Legion (1780–1783)
- American Volunteers (1779–1780)
- Armed Boat Company (1781–1783)
- Black Company of Pioneers (also, known as the Black Pioneers, later merged into the Guides and Pioneers in 1778), (pioneers, another name for military construction engineers) (1777–1778)
- British Legion (placed on American establishment in 1781 as 5th American Regiment) (1777–1778)
- Bucks County Dragoons (absorbed by British Legion in 1780) (1778–1780)
- Butler's Rangers (1777–1784)
- Caledonian Volunteers (formed part of the British Legion in 1778) (1777–1778)
- Campbell's Dragoons (South Carolina Dragoons) (1781)
- Canadian Companies (1777–1783)
- Claus' Rangers (1775–1783)
- Collett's Independent Company (1777)
- De Lancey's Brigade (1776–1783)
- Detroit Volunteers (claimed descent from Roger's Rangers, later became 1st Battalion 119th Field Artillery Regiment, Michigan National Guard) (1778–1783)
- Diemar's Troop of Black Hussars (also, known as Diemar's Hussars and Black Hussars), hussars, (light cavalry) (1779–1781)
- Duke of Cumberland's Regiment (1781–1783)
- Duchess County Company (1776–1777)
- Emmerich's Chasseurs (chasseurs / light cavalry) (1777–1779)
- Fenwick's Dragoons (South Carolina Dragoons) (1781)
- Forshner's Independent Company (1780–1781)
- Georgia Light Dragoons (there was also, a Local Volunteer Corps unit, of the same name) (1779–1781)
- Georgia Loyalists (1779–1782)
- Governor Wentworth's Volunteers (1777–1781)
- Guides and Pioneers (absorbed the Black Company of Pioneers in 1778) (1778–1783)
- Harkimer's Batteau Company (1780–1783)
- Hierlihy's Corps
- James Island Light Dragoons
- King's American Dragoons
- King's American Regiment (placed on American establishment, in 1781, as 4th American Regiment, part of the regular, British Army) (1776–1783)
- King's Rangers
- King's (Carolina) Rangers
- King's Orange Rangers
- King's Royal Regiment of New York
- Kinloch's Light Dragoons (formed part of the British Legion in 1778)
- Locke's Independent Company
- Loyal American Rangers (1780–1783)
- Loyal American Regiment
- Loyal Foresters
- Loyal New Englanders
- Loyal Rangers
- Loyal Rhode Islanders
- Maryland Loyalists Battalion
- McAlpin's Corps (also, known as McAlpin's Corps of Royalists, absorbed the American Volunteers, King’s Loyal Americans, Queen’s Loyal Rangers, and Adams' Rangers)
- Nassau Blues
- Newfoundland Regiment (placed on British establishment in 1782)
- New Hampshire Volunteers
- New Jersey Volunteers (Skinner's Greens)
- Newport Artillery Company (Rhode Island) 1741
- New York Volunteers (placed on American establishment, as 3rd American Regiment in 1779)
- North Carolina Highlanders
- North Carolina Independent Company
- North Carolina Independent Dragoons
- Pennsylvania Loyalists
- Philadelphia Light Dragoons (formed part of the British Legion in 1778)
- Prince of Wales's American Volunteers
- Provincial Light Infantry
- Queen's Rangers (placed on American establishment, in 1779, as 1st American Regiment, descended from Roger's Rangers)
- Roman Catholic Volunteers (1777–1778)
- Royal American Reformers
- Royal Fencible Americans
- Royal Garrison Battalion (placed on British establishment in 178
- Royal Georgia Volunteers
- Royal Highland Emigrants (placed on British establishment in 1779 as 84th Foot)
- Royal Nova Scotia Volunteer Regiment
- Saint John's Volunteers
- Starkloff's Dragoons (South Carolina Dragoons) (1781)
- South Carolina Rangers
- South Carolina Royalists
- Stewart's Troop of Light Dragoons
- Van Alstine's Batteau Company
- Volunteers of Ireland (absorbed the Roman Catholic Volunteers and New Jersey Volunteers and placed on American establishment, in 1779, as 2nd American Regiment, part of the regular, British Army) (1778–1782)
- Volunteers of New England
- West Florida Royal Foresters
- West Jersey Volunteers

=== Local Volunteer Corps ===
- Adams Company of Rangers (also, known as Adams' Rangers) (1777–1780)
- Bay Fusiliers (also, known as Mosquito Shore Volunteers and Black River Volunteers) (1779–?)
- Bucks County Volunteers (1778–1783)
- Detroit Volunteers (1778–1783)
- Dunlop's Corps (1780–1781)
- East Florida Rangers (1776–1779)
- East Florida Volunteers (1777–1780)
- Ethiopian Regiment (1775–1776)
- Georgia Light Dragoons (there was also, a Provincial Corps unit, of the same name) (1781–1782)
- Georgia Rangers (1773–1776)
- Georgia Rifle Dragoons (1779)
- King's Dock Yard Volunteers (1780)
- King's Loyal Americans (1776–1781)
- Loyal Volunteers of the City of New York, under the command of Mayor David Mathews
- Mackay's Corps (also, known as Mackay’s Corps of Royalists, Pfister's Corps of Royalists, and Leake's Corps of Royalists) (1777–1781)
- Mayor's Independent Company of Volunteers of New York City under the command of Loyalist Mayor David Mathews
- McAlpin's Corps of Royalists (also, known as McAlpin's Corps and American Volunteers) (1777–1781)
- Mosquito Shore Volunteers (also, known as Bay Fusiliers and Black River Volunteers) (1779–?)
- Natchez Volunteers (1781)
- Negro Volunteers (1779)
- Newfoundland Volunteers (1779–1980)
- North Carolina Volunteers (1776)
- Queen's Loyal Rangers (1777–1781)
- Queen's Loyal Virginia Regiment (absorbed by Queen's Rangers in 1776) (1776–1783)
- Queen's Royal Rangers (1775–1776)
- Rattan and Black River Volunteers (1780–1781)
- Royal Bateaux Volunteers (bateau|batteux) (1779–1781)
- Royal Ethiopian Regiment (disbanded) (1775–1776)
- Virginia Light Horse (1776)
- Virginia Volunteers (1781)
- Volunteers of Augusta (1781–1782)
- West Florida Provincials (1778–1781)
- West Florida Refugees (1777–1781)

=== Associator and Refugee units ===
- Associated Loyalists (1780–1782)
- Black Brigade (Black Loyalists) (1779–1783)
- Brant's Volunteers (1777–1779)
- De Lancey's Refugees (1776–1783)
- Hatfield's Company of Partisans (partisan irregulars) (1779–1782)
- Hazard's Corps of Refugees (1780–1782)
- James Stewart's Company of Refugees (1780–1781)
- King's Militia Volunteers (1779–1780)
- Loyal American Association (1775–1776)
- Loyal Associated Refugees (1779)
- Loyal Irish Volunteers (1775–1776)
- Loyal Newport Associators (1777–1779)
- Loyal Refugee Volunteers (1779–1782)
- Maryland Royal Retaliators (1780–1781)
- Pepperell's Corps (1779–?)
- Robins Company of Partisans (partisan irregulars) (1780–1782?)
- Royal North British Volunteers (1775–1776)
- Sharp's Refugee Marines (marines - naval-based infantry force) (1779)
- Uzal Ward's Company of Refugees (1780–1783)

=== Militia units ===
- Charleston Militia (1780–1782)
- Charleston Volunteer Battalion (1780–1782)
- Detroit Militia (1775–1784)
- East Florida Militia (1776–1783)
- Georgia Artillery (1781–1782)
- Georgia Militia (1779–1782)
- German Independent Company, (part of New York City Militia) (1776–?)
- Independent Troop of Black Dragoons (also, known as Black Pioneer Troop) (1782)
- Loyal Commissariat Volunteers (1779–1782)
- Loyal Ordnance Volunteers (1780)
- Loyal Volunteers of the City of New York (also, known as New York City Militia) (1776–1783)
- Massachusetts Militia (1775–1783)
- Massachusetts Volunteers (1777–1783)
- McDonald's Company of Volunteers (1778)
- Minorca Volunteer Company (part of East Florida Militia) (1777–?)
- New Jersey Militia (1776–1777)
- New York City Militia (1776–1783)
- New York Independent Highland Volunteers (1776–1783)
- New York Marine Artillery Company (1780–1783)
- New York Militia (1776–1783)
- New York Rangers (1776–1783)
- North Carolina Militia (1781–1782)
- Nova Scotia Militia (1775–1784)
- Nova Scotia Volunteer Militia Regiment (1776–1781)
- Quebec City Militia (1775–1783)
- Quebec Militia (1775–1783)
- Saint Johns County Volunteers (1781)
- South Carolina Militia (1775–1782)
- South Carolina Volunteers (1781–1782)
- Westchester Chasseurs (chasseurs (light cavalry) (1777)
- West Florida Militia (1778–1781)

=== West Indian units ===
- Barbados Militia
- Barbadian Rangers (1781–1783)
- Black Carolina Corps
- Grenada Militia (1775–1779)
- Jamaica Corps of Foot (also, known as the Jamaica Corps and Amherst’s Corps) (1781–1783)
- Independent Companies (Jamaica)
- Jamaica Legion (absorbed by Jamaica Volunteers in 1780) (1780)
- Jamaica Light Dragoons (1780–1781)
- Jamaica Militia (1780–1781)
- Jamaica Rangers (1779–1783)
- Jamaica Volunteers (absorbed the Jamaica Legion, after 1780) (1779–1781)
- Turks Island Company (1781–1783)

== German auxiliary units ==
=== Principality of Anhalt-Zerbst ===
- Rauschenplatt's Princess of Anhalt-Zerbst's Regiment (2 battalions, 1 infantry in Quebec (1778), and 1 "Pandour" in New York (1780))
- Nuppenau's Jäger Company
- Company of Artillery

=== Margrave of Ansbach and Bayreuth ===
- 1st Regiment Anspach (later Regiment von Volt; 1st Anspach Battalion)
- 2nd Regiment Bayreuth (later Regiment Seybothen; 2nd Anspach Battalion)
- Anspach Jäger Company

=== Duchy of Brunswick ===
- Dragoon Regiment Prinz Lüdwig Ernst
- Grenadier Battalion Breymann
- Light Infantry Battalion von Barner
- Musketeer Regiment Riedesel
- Musketeer Regiment Specht
- Regiment Prinz Friedrich
- Regiment von Rhetz
- von Geyso's Jäger Company

=== Electorate of Hanover ===
- 1st Battalion von Reden
- 1st Battalion von Hardenberg
- 1st Battalion la Motte
- 2nd Battalion Prinz Ernst von Mecklenburg
- 2nd Battalion von Goldacker
- 14th Regiment
- 15th Regiment

=== Landgrave of Hesse-Kassel (or Hesse-Cassel) ===
- Combined Regiment von Loos
- Fusilier Regiment von Dittfurth
- Fusilier Regiment Erbprinz (later Musketeer Regiment (1780))
- Fusilier Regiment von Knyphausen
- Fusilier Regiment von Lossburg
- Grenadier Regiment von Rall (later von Wöllwarth (1777); von Trümbach (1779); d'Angelelli (1781))
  - 1st Battalion Grenadiers von Linsing
  - 2nd Battalion Grenadiers von Block (later von Lengerke)
  - 3rd Battalion Grenadiers von Minnigerode (later von Loewenstein)
  - 4th Battalion Grenadiers von Koehler (later von Graff; von Platte)
- Garrison Regiment von Bünau
- Garrison Regiment von Huyne (later von Benning)
- Garrison Regiment von Stein (later von Seitz; von Porbeck)
- Garrison Regiment von Wissenbach (later von Knoblauch)
- Jäger Corps
- Leib Infantry Regiment
- Musketeer Regiment von Donop
- Musketeer Regiment von Trümbach (later Von Bose (1779))
- Musketeer Regiment von Mirbach (later Jung von Lossburg (1780))
- Musketeer Regiment Prinz Carl
- Musketeer Regiment von Wutginau (later Landgraf (1777))

=== County of Hesse-Hanau ===
- Janecke's Frei Corps of Light Infantry
- Musketeer Regiment Erbprinz
- Creuzbourg's Jäger Corps
- Pausch's Company of Artillery

=== Principality of Waldeck ===
- 3rd Waldeck Regiment

== See also ==
- British Army during the American War of Independence
- List of Regiments of Foot
- List of British Army regiments (1881)
- List of Continental Forces in the American Revolutionary War
