= McAlpin's Corps =

- Active: 1777-1783
- Country: Great Britain
- Allegiance: British Army
- Branch: infantry
- Type: Loyalist local volunteer corps, (auxiliary troops)
- Role: infantry, fortification construction
- Size: battalion-corps (184)
- Garrison/HQ: Province of Quebec
- Nickname(s): McAlpin's Corps of Royalists, American Volunteers
- Engagements: American Revolutionary War: Saratoga Campaign (1777); Battle of Freeman's Farm (1777)

Commanders
- Notable commanders: General Sir William Howe General John Burgoyne Brigadier General Sir John Johnson Lieutenant General Sir Frederick Haldimand Major-Commandant Daniel McAlpin Major John Nairne Major Edward Jessup Major Patrick Ferguson

McAlpin's Corps, also known as McAlpin's Corps of Royalists and the American Volunteers, referred to either of two loyalist units in the British Army, in British Canada, commanded by Major Daniel McAlpin, during the American Revolutionary War. In most instances, the name described the American Volunteers, a corps of American Loyalists, who served in the 1777 Burgoyne Expedition, of the Saratoga Campaign. The term was also used, at times, to refer to a 'battalion' put under the command of McAlpin, in 1779, formed from the remnants of General Burgoyne's several loyalist corps, including the "American Volunteers", the King's Loyal Americans, the Queen's Loyal Rangers, and Adams' Rangers.

== Corps formed ==
McAlpin's Corps, the "American Volunteers", first mustered in on August 1, 1777. Daniel McAlpin was a retired, elderly British army captain of the 60th Royal American Regiment who had become a major landholder, in Stillwater, Province of New York. After 1775, Daniel McAlpin was actively persecuted by rebels for his loyalty. In September 1776, he received a warrant from Sir William Howe to raise a Loyalist corps and secretly begin recruiting men. McAlpin was arrested, but later escaped and went into hiding. When the British Army, under General John Burgoyne, marched south towards Albany, McAlpin joined at Fort Edward.

== Campaigns ==
The corps numbered some 184 men and officers and was engaged largely in the "batteau service" and defending supply lines, during the Saratoga Campaign. Following the Battle of Freeman's Farm, a portion of Daniel McAlpin's men were drafted into British regiments to help offset heavy casualties. After the defeat at the battle of Bemis Heights, Burgoyne allowed loyalist troops to quietly escape before his surrender. Men of the American Volunteers were entrusted with transporting Burgoyne's military pay chest back to Canada to prevent its capture. Fifty of these men were taken prisoner on the retreat, but the chest was safely delivered.

The Loyalist units of Burgoyne's army returned to British Canada seriously mauled and badly under-strength. The Corps was loosely assembled into a battalion, initially under Sir John Johnson of the King's Royal Regiment. In May 1779, the unit was turned over to McAlpin, who was made Major-Commandant. The troops were primarily engaged in garrison duty and building fortifications to secure the Province of Quebec against Patriot American invasion.

In late 1779, Daniel McAlpin became seriously ill. Despite his condition, he continued in his duties until his death in July, 1780. McAlpin was replaced by Major John Nairne, of the 84th Regiment of Foot or "Royal Highland Emigrants", who was ordered to form the rather loose collection of men into formal companies. Even so, the unit was often referred to as McAlpin's Corps.

In November, 1781, the American Volunteers, King's Loyal Americans and most of the Queens Loyal Rangers were incorporated into a new provincial regiment, the Loyal Rangers, under the command of Major Edward Jessup. The former Corps also, became a part of the, King's American Regiment.

== Corps disbanded and resettled in British Canada ==
Following the war the Loyal Rangers, including former American Volunteers, were settled in the South East of what is now the Province of Ontario, in Ernestown, Edwardsburgh, Augusta, and Elizabethtown townships.

== Sources ==
King's Men: The soldier founders of Ontario
Mary Beacock Fryer, Dundurn Press, Toronto, Ontario, 1980

Skulking for the King
J. Fraser, The Boston Mills Press, Erin, Ontario, 1985

The History and Master Roll of the King's Royal Regiment of New York
Cruikshank and Watt, Global Heritage Press, Campbellville, Ontario, 2006
