= Armed Boat Company =

- Active: 1781–1783
- Country: British America
- Allegiance: Britain
- Branch: H.M. Provincial Forces
- Type: Amphibious raiding force
- Size: Company (50–70)
- Engagements: American Revolutionary War: Whaleboat War

Commanders
- Notable commanders: Captain William Luce; Captain Nathanael Hubbel

The Armed Boat Company was a seagoing Loyalist military unit, with a strong black presence, operating as an amphibious raiding force out of New York City during the Whaleboat War. It was raised in 1781 and disbanded after the British evacuation of New York in November 1783.

== Background ==
After the British occupation of New York City in 1776, Long Island was used as a supply base. Supplies were brought to the coast of the island and shipped by sea to the city. Patriot amphibious forces in whaleboats attacked supply vessels at sea and supply warehouses on land; but also plundered the local population, who during the war largely consisted of loyalist refugees. The British had organized three battalions for the defense of Long Island, but two of these were sent to Georgia in 1778. In spite of repeated protests in 1780 and 1781, by the British commander-in-chief, Sir Henry Clinton, the Royal Navy allocated far too few ships to be able to effectively prevent the attacks.

== Formation ==
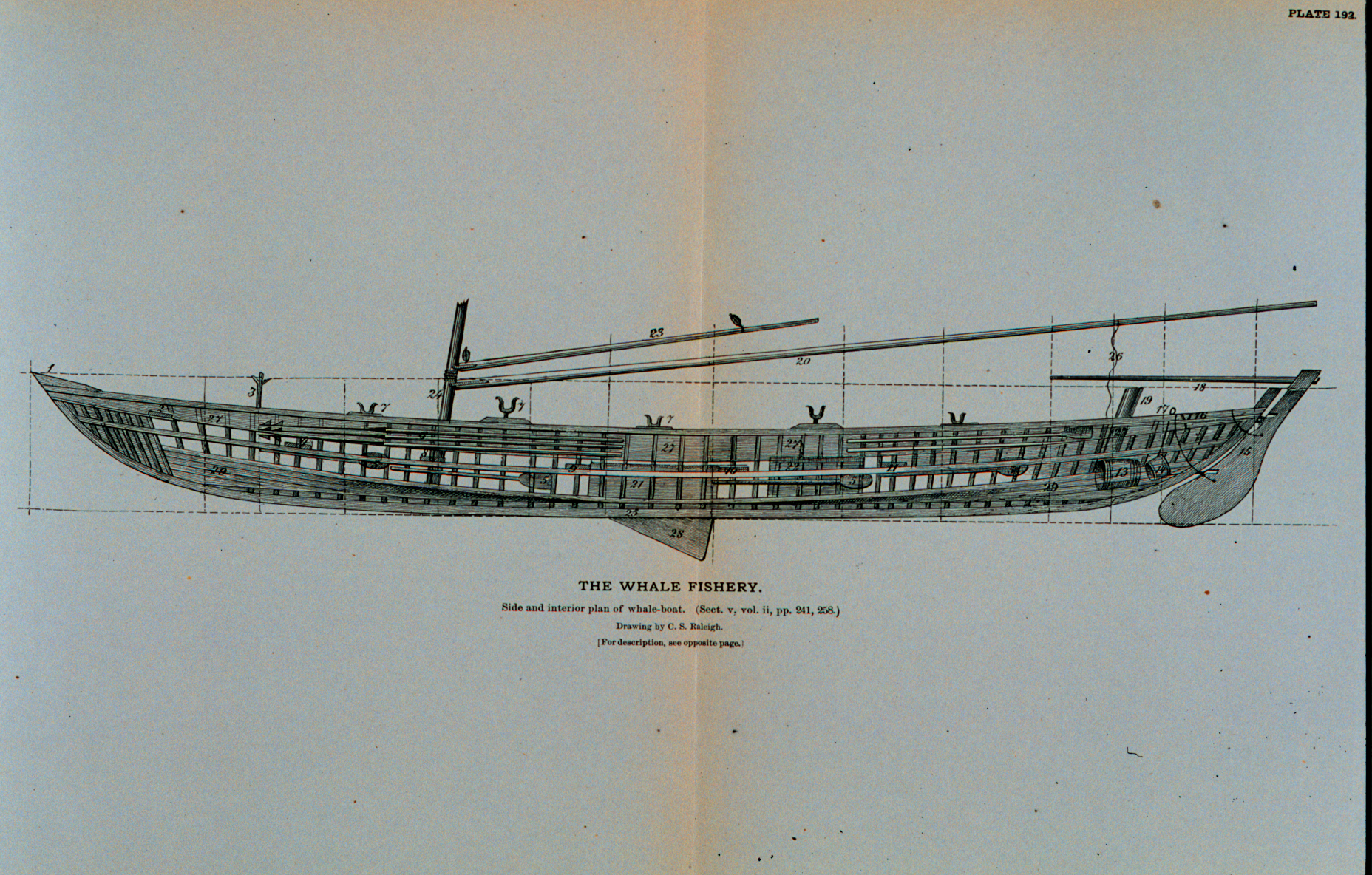
Diagram of a whaleboat.

The Armed Boat Company was organized in 1781 under a warrant issued by the Commander in Chief of the British Army in America, authorizing William Luce, a New Jersey loyalist, to raise one company of able bodied men employed in whaleboats and other armed vessels. The term of enlistment was two years or, if required, until the end of the war; with the same pay as marines serving on armed vessels of the Quartermaster-General's Department. The men were to be clothed and armed and serve under the same regulations as His Majesty's Provincial Forces. The Company served until British evacuation of New York City in November 1783.

== Organization ==
The Armed Boat Company was originally to have one captain, four lieutenants, eight mates and 92 privates. In 1782 its strength was increased to 125 men. A return from 1783 shows that the company had 81 officers and other ranks; of which one captain, six mates and 50 privates at the East River boat yard, and one lieutenant, two mates and 21 privates at Fort Knyphausen. Many of its members were recruited in Essex County, New Jersey. Several members of the company were former slaves. During an operation in 1782, the Company contained 40 blacks and 40 whites.

Captain William Luce, the officer entrusted with organizing the company was soon captured by the Patriots. His replacement was Captain Nathanael Hubbel.

== Operations ==
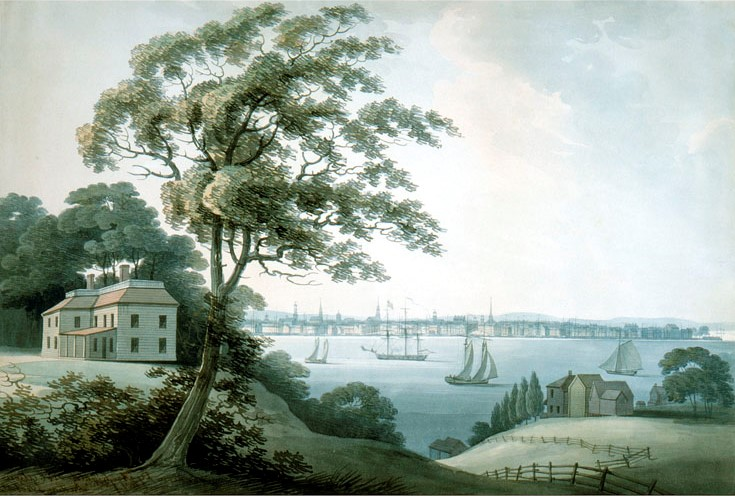
New York City seen from Long Island at the end of the 18th century.

The Armed Boat Company was created as an amphibious raiding force with its base in New York City. Its primary mission was to attack and demoralize Continental troops along the shores of New Jersey and Connecticut, including destruction of military and civilian stores and property. Another important mission was to combat Patriot amphibious forces that raided British-held Long Island and Patriot privateers that operated against British merchant shipping during the Whaleboat War.

The Company participated in engagements on the Hudson River at Tappan Zee, on August 21, 1781; at Woodbridge, New Jersey on December 21, 1781; and off Elizabethtown Point, New Jersey on March 10, 1782. On January 8, 1782, the Company joined about 300 British regulars in attacking Patriot whaleboats at New Brunswick, New Jersey. Black and white troops from the Company landed at Forked River on June 5, 1782, burning the saltworks and confiscating private property.

The company was also involved in the attack on Toms River, New Jersey, a Patriot whaleboat base and the locality of important saltworks, on March 23, 1782. Together with 40 Associated Loyalists took the Patriot blockhouse and most of its garrison after a bloody struggle with several killed and wounded. Among the prisoners were a Patriot captain, Joshua Huddy, who was handed over to Captain Richard Lippencot of the Associators, in order to exchange him for an Associator captain who had been captured a week earlier. At that occasion, an Associator taken prisoner by the Patriots had either been murdered or killed while trying to escape. As a retaliation, Captain Lippencott killed his Patriot counterpart on the Jersey Shore, which lead to George Washington threatened with revenge.
