= Warren Peacocke =

British general

General Sir Warren Peacocke KCH
- Born: 21 September 1766
- Died: 22 August 1849, age 82; 49 Brook Street, London
- Burial place: Kensal Green Cemetery
- Military career
- Allegiance: United Kingdom
- Branch: British Army
- Service years: 1780–1849
- Rank: General
- Unit: Coldstream Guards
- Commands: 4th Brigade, 4th Division; Commandant of Lisbon
- Conflicts: French Revolutionary Wars; Irish Rebellion; Battle of Ballynahinch; Anglo-Russian invasion of Holland; Egypt Campaign; Battle of Abukir; Battle of Mandora; Battle of Alexandria; Napoleonic Wars; Hanover Expedition; Copenhagen Expedition; Peninsular War; Second Battle of Porto; Lines of Torres Vedras
- Awards: Knight Bachelor; Knight Commander of the Royal Guelphic Order; Knight Commander of the Tower and the Sword (Portugal); Knight of the Order of the Crescent (Ottoman Empire)
- Other work: Governor of Kinsale

General Sir Warren Marmaduke Peacocke KCH (21 September 1766–22 August 1849) was a British Army officer of the eighteenth and nineteenth centuries, most notable for his command of the Lisbon garrison during the Peninsular War. Peacocke joined the British Army in 1780, serving with a series of units before transferring to the Coldstream Guards in 1793. After having served as an aide de camp during the Irish Rebellion of 1798, Peacocke fought as a company commander with his regiment in the Egypt Campaign between 1800 and 1801, for which he was made a Knight of the Order of the Crescent by the Ottoman Empire. He subsequently served with the Coldstream Guards on the Hanover Expedition in 1805 and Copenhagen Expedition in 1807.

Promoted to colonel in 1808, Peacocke served with his regiment at the beginning of the Peninsular War, fighting at the Second Battle of Porto. In June 1809 he left regimental service to take up post as Commandant of Lisbon, which he would hold until the end of the Peninsular War. Tasked with organising troops ready to join the Duke of Wellington's army, as well as with arranging the rehabilitation of injured soldiers and coordinating with the Portuguese government, Peacocke was promoted to brigadier-general in May 1811 and major-general in June. He was made a Knight Commander of the Tower and the Sword by Portugal and a Knight Bachelor by Britain for his services during the Napoleonic Wars.

Not sent on active service again after the wars, Peacocke was promoted to lieutenant-general in 1821 and then appointed to the sinecure of the governorship of Kinsale in 1830. He was subsequently promoted to general in 1838 and became colonel of the 19th Regiment of Foot in 1843. He died at 49 Brook Street, London, aged 82, in 1849.

== Early life ==
Warren Marmaduke Peacocke was born on 21 September 1766, the son of Marmaduke Peacocke, of London, and Mary Peacocke, of County Clare. His parents were cousins, and Peacocke their eldest child. He had four younger brothers who all had military careers, including Richard who became a vice-admiral and Thomas who became a general.

== Military career ==
=== Early service ===
Peacocke joined the British Army on 12 December 1780, being commissioned as an ensign in the 88th Regiment of Foot. While officially part of the regiment, at the time of his posting to the 88th it was serving in the West Indies. However, there is no evidence to say that he ever served there. Peacocke was promoted to lieutenant on 22 May 1782 and captain-lieutenant on 14 April 1783, but in the latter year the 88th was disbanded, the American Revolutionary War having ended. This left Peacocke on half pay, a position in which he stayed until 1 December 1786 when he was appointed a captain in the 17th Regiment of Foot.

Peacocke was still serving in the 17th when, in 1789, the regiment was ordered to provide soldiers to temporarily serve as marines on board Royal Navy vessels. As such Peacocke served on the 74-gun ship of the line HMS Colossus, guardship at Portsmouth, for six months. He then returned to regular service with the 17th, continuing there until 3 April 1792 when he transferred to the 59th Regiment of Foot. Peacocke stayed with the 59th only briefly, moving to the command of an independent company on 22 October 1793. He in turn quickly exchanged this command for a place in the Coldstream Guards, joining the latter regiment in the rank of lieutenant (regimental rank) and captain (army rank) on 7 November of the same year. (Note: Also recorded as transferring on 6 November. The latter rank provided Peacocke with seniority among army officers as a whole, but his regimental rank denoted his separate position within the Coldstream Guards.)

The Coldstream Guards became Peacocke's long term regiment, with him no longer attempting any exchanges or transfers. He was promoted to brevet major on 1 March 1794, and on 3 May 1796 was seconded from the regiment to become aide-de-camp to Major-General George Nugent in Ireland. Peacocke was still serving in Ireland on 1 January 1798 when he was promoted to brevet lieutenant-colonel, and later in the year he was present at and served in the suppression of the Irish Rebellion of 1798. He was present at the Battle of Ballynahinch on 12 June. Peacocke re-joined his regiment in the following year and travelled to fight in the Anglo-Russian invasion of Holland, but arrived there only after the fighting had ended and as the evacuation of the allied forces was occurring. Having returned to England, he was promoted to captain-lieutenant and lieutenant-colonel on 9 May 1800 and given command of a company within the 1st Battalion of the Coldstream Guards.

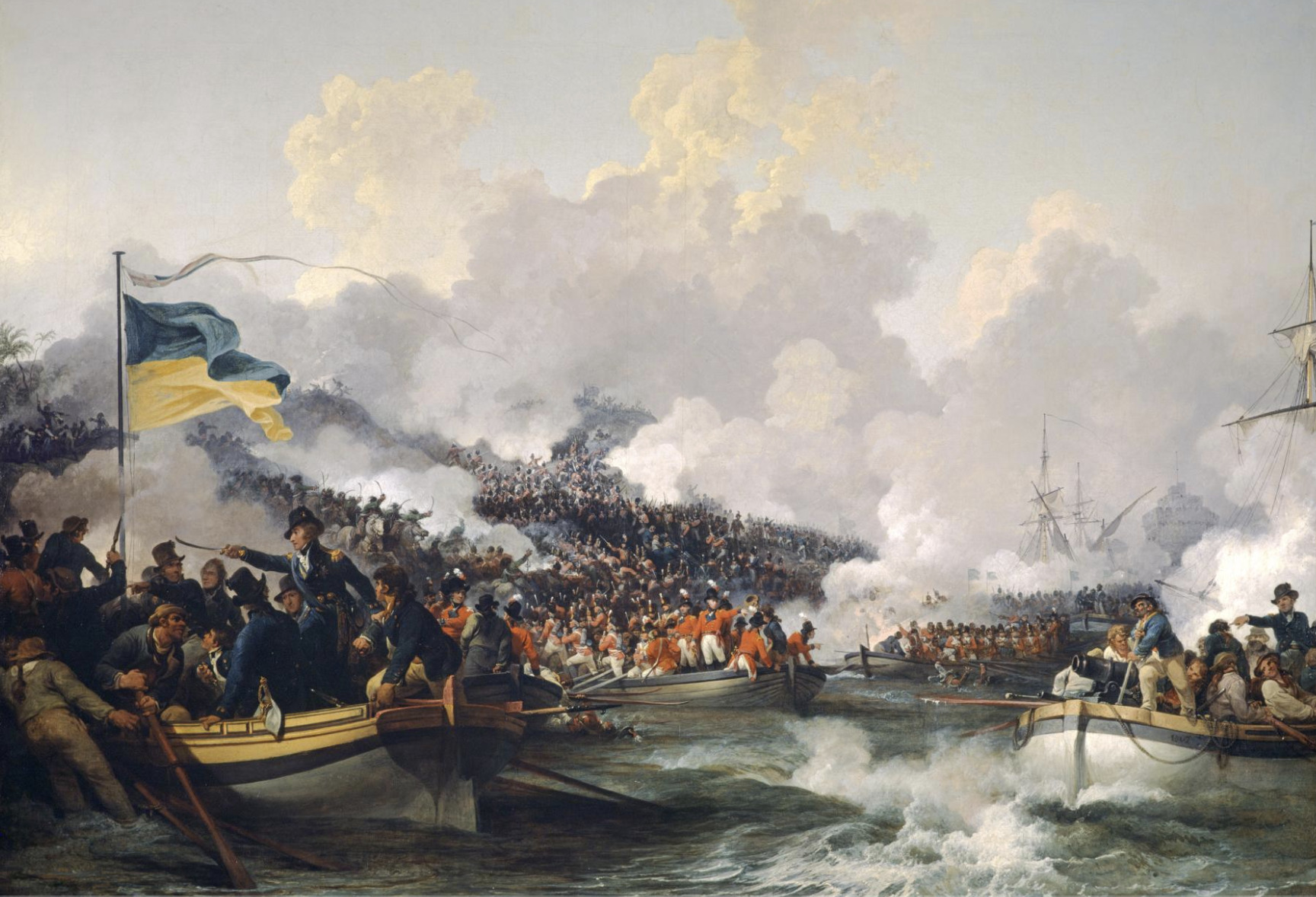
The Landing of British Troops at Aboukir (Philip James de Loutherbourg, 1802)

Later in 1800 Peacocke's battalion was sent to serve in the invasion of French-occupied Egypt, and he led his company through that campaign from the landings at the Battle of Abukir on 8 March 1801, where the battalion was in one of two brigades in the first wave of the attack. The Coldstream Guards fought at the Battle of Mandora on 13 March and then at the Battle of Alexandria on 21 March. In this latter battle Peacocke was given command of the advance guard of the army, attacking and forcing away the French gun batteries that were placed to the west of the city to guard a nearby flotilla of ships. Continuing on campaign, he was promoted to captain and lieutenant-colonel on 19 November. Peacocke returned to England towards the end of the year, the campaign having finished successfully. For his services in Egypt he was created a Knight of the Order of the Crescent by the Ottoman Empire. Peacocke stayed on garrison duty in England for several years after this, before in 1805 his battalion joined the Guards Brigade commanded by Major-General Edward Finch. This brigade was then sent to fight in the Hanover Expedition, arriving there in November. The expedition was not a success and Peacocke saw no action before returning to England in February 1806.

=== Peninsular War ===
Peacocke went on campaign as part of Finch's Guards Brigade again in August 1807, when his battalion joined the expedition to Copenhagen tasked with capturing or destroying the Danish navy to ensure it was not taken intact by the French. With this completed, Peacocke returned to England in November. He was then promoted to brevet colonel on 25 April 1808, and continued to command his company. The battalion then joined Major-General John Sherbrooke's army sent to secure Cádiz, sailing on 15 January 1809, but the Spaniards refused to allow the British force to disembark and instead they went to Lisbon. Here the force joined Lieutenant-General Sir Arthur Wellesley's Peninsular army and Peacocke fought with the Guards in a campaign to retake the city of Porto from the French. This culminated in the Second Battle of Porto on 12 May, where the city was finally recovered. Soon after this Peacocke's health began to deteriorate due to the rigors of service on campaign, and he retired to Lisbon to recuperate; while he went about this, he served as the temporary commander of the garrison there.

Later in May Peacocke had recovered from his health setback, but instead of re-joining his battalion, he requested that he be assigned to Wellesley's staff so that he could serve in his army rank of colonel rather than in his regimental rank of captain. Initially Peacocke was not allowed to do this because there were several colonels in the army who were senior to him, who would therefore hold the rights to any staff position before him. However, by the middle of June the composition of the army had changed and Peacocke was now the second most senior colonel without a staff appointment. His request was finally granted, and on 14 June he was given command of the 4th Brigade. On 18 June divisions were formed within the army, and Peacocke's brigade was assigned to 4th Division. Peacocke himself, however, never had the chance to officially take charge of his new brigade, because in the meantime Wellesley had discovered a need for a permanent commander of the Lisbon garrison, who would necessarily need to be a senior officer, to manage operations in support of the army from that city.

=== Commandant of Lisbon ===
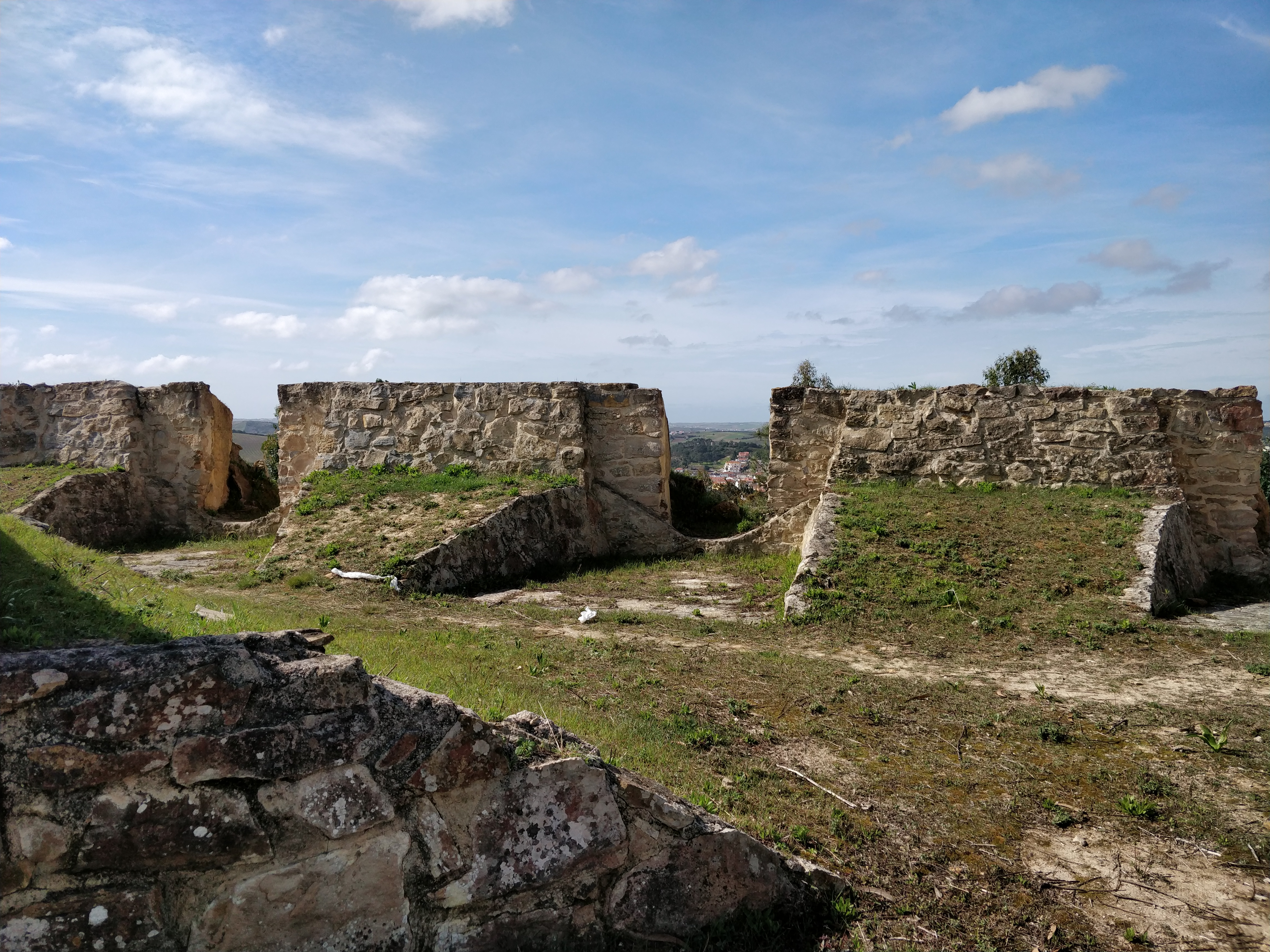
A surviving section of the Lines of Torres Vedras

On 22 June Peacocke, with his previous experience of the Lisbon garrison, was appointed Commandant of Lisbon. (Note: Also titled as Governor of Lisbon.) Peacocke now commanded all British soldiers serving in the garrison as well as all those landing at Lisbon to join Wellesley's main army. He was in charge of housing the new arrivals and of inspecting them for readiness to start their active service. In the winter of 1810 Wellesley's army retreated to the Lines of Torres Vedras, defences that had been built to protect Lisbon, and Peacocke was involved in helping to hold the lines with his garrison. Working alongside units of militia and the Ordenanças, his command during this period was described by military engineer Major-General Sir John Jones as "an efficient as well as imposing force".

As well as soldiers going to the army, Peacocke also had responsibility over those returning from the army for medical reasons, billeting them and monitoring their recovery. Many soldiers who were sent to recuperate in Lisbon attempted to accentuate their illnesses or injuries in order to spend more time away from the army, and this became one of Peacocke's most frequent problems. Peacocke was "disgusted" by these "useless officers", and on several occasions he requested that Wellesley find a different officer to fill the post at Lisbon so that he would not have to involve himself with them. Wellesley however had a great appreciation for the work Peacocke was doing for him in Lisbon, saying that "you are too valuable here to be replaced by anyone. I cannot possibly spare you".

Captain Rees Howell Gronow echoed Wellesley's opinion of Peacocke, saying that he was "remarkable for his urbanity of manner, his untiring business habits, and a keen judgment which made him alike an accomplished statesman and an intelligent soldier". Wellesley appointed Peacocke a brigadier-general on 9 May 1811, backdating the promotion to 23 January. Then on 4 June Peacocke was promoted to major-general. Not all of the British were as positive towards Peacocke's work. When the 15th Hussars arrived at their barracks in Lisbon in February 1813 they found them in a very poor state. They recorded Peacocke's operations as "so excessive bad that nothing was to be procured without considerable delay and much difficulty; in general things appeared excessively mismanaged".

As well as working with and commanding the British presence in Lisbon Peacocke was also one of the chief liaisons with the Portuguese government, corresponding between it, Wellesley, and the British government. The Portuguese were not always supportive of the military presence in their capital city, and Peacocke was often tasked with reconciling them to the situation. He only relinquished his command at Lisbon when the Peninsular War ended in April 1814. The Portuguese rewarded Peacocke for his services by creating him a Knight Commander of the Tower and the Sword on 17 December, but he was not equally rewarded by the British government. While the majority of his contemporaries who had served as general officers under Wellesley were made Knights Commander of the Order of the Bath, Peacocke was not. Instead, he was made a Knight Bachelor on 27 July 1815, which award historians Ron McGuigan and Robert Burnham suggest was only given to him because of the Portuguese knighthood he already held.

== Retirement ==
Peacocke returned home in 1814 and was not employed during the Hundred Days campaign, or for a long time afterwards. He was promoted to lieutenant-general on 19 July 1821 and was then given the sinecure post of Governor of Kinsale on 3 August 1830, which provided him with an annual salary of £315 5s 4d. He was further rewarded for his services in 1832 when he was made a Knight Commander of the Royal Guelphic Order. His final promotion came on 28 June 1838 when he was made a general, and his final official army position was the colonelcy of the 19th Regiment of Foot, which he was appointed to on 31 May 1843. Peacocke spent his later life living in retirement at his family seat of Rivers Hall in Boxted, Essex. He died on 22 August 1849 at the age of 82 in the Coulson Hotel at 49 Brook Street, London. Unmarried, Peacocke left his estate to his nephew George Sandford. He was buried at Kensal Green Cemetery, where he is commemorated by an obelisk.

== Notes and citations ==
=== Citations ===
Government offices
Preceded by William Guard	Governor of Kinsale; 1830–1849	Succeeded by Position abolished
Military offices
Preceded by Sir Hilgrove Turner	Colonel of the 19th (The 1st Yorkshire North Riding) Regiment of Foot; 1843–1849	Succeeded by Charles Turner
