= John Sinnott (VC) =

Irish recipient of the Victoria Cross

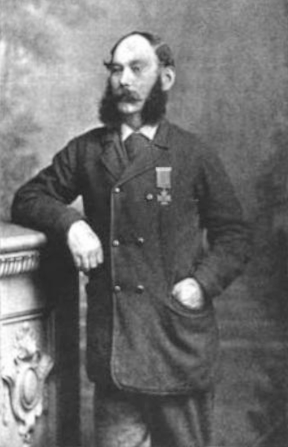
- Born: 1829; Wexford, Ireland
- Died: 20 July 1896 (aged 66–67); Clapham, London
- Burial place: Battersea New Cemetery, Morden
- Military career
- Allegiance: United Kingdom
- Branch: British Army
- Rank: Sergeant
- Units: 84th Regiment of Foot
- Conflicts: Indian Mutiny
- Awards: Victoria Cross

John Sinnott VC (1829 – 20 July 1896) was born in Wexford and was an Irish recipient of the Victoria Cross, the highest and most prestigious award for gallantry in the face of the enemy that can be awarded to British and Commonwealth forces.

== Details ==
He was about 28 years old, and a lance corporal in the 84th Regiment (later the 2nd Battalion, York and Lancaster Regiment), British Army during the Indian Mutiny when the following deed took place on 6 October 1857 at Lucknow, British India for which he was awarded the VC:

For conspicuous gallantry at Lucknow, on the 6th of October, 1857, in going out with Serjeants Glinn and Mullins and private Mullins, to rescue Lieutenant Gibaut, who, in carrying out water to extinguish a fire in the breastwork, had been mortally wounded, and lay outside. They brought in the body under a heavy fire. Lance-Corporal Sinnott was twice wounded. His comrades unanimously elected him for the Victoria Cross, as the most worthy. He had previously repeatedly accompanied Lieutenant Gibaut when he carried out water to extinguish the fire. Despatch from Lieutenant-General Sir James Outram, Bart., G.C.B., dated 2nd December 1857.

== Further information ==
Elected by the regiment. He later achieved the rank of Sergeant. He died at Clapham, London on 20 July 1896.

== The medal ==
His Victoria Cross is displayed at The York & Lancaster Regiment Museum, Rotherham, South Yorkshire, England.
