= George Bernard =

British army officer

General George Bernard
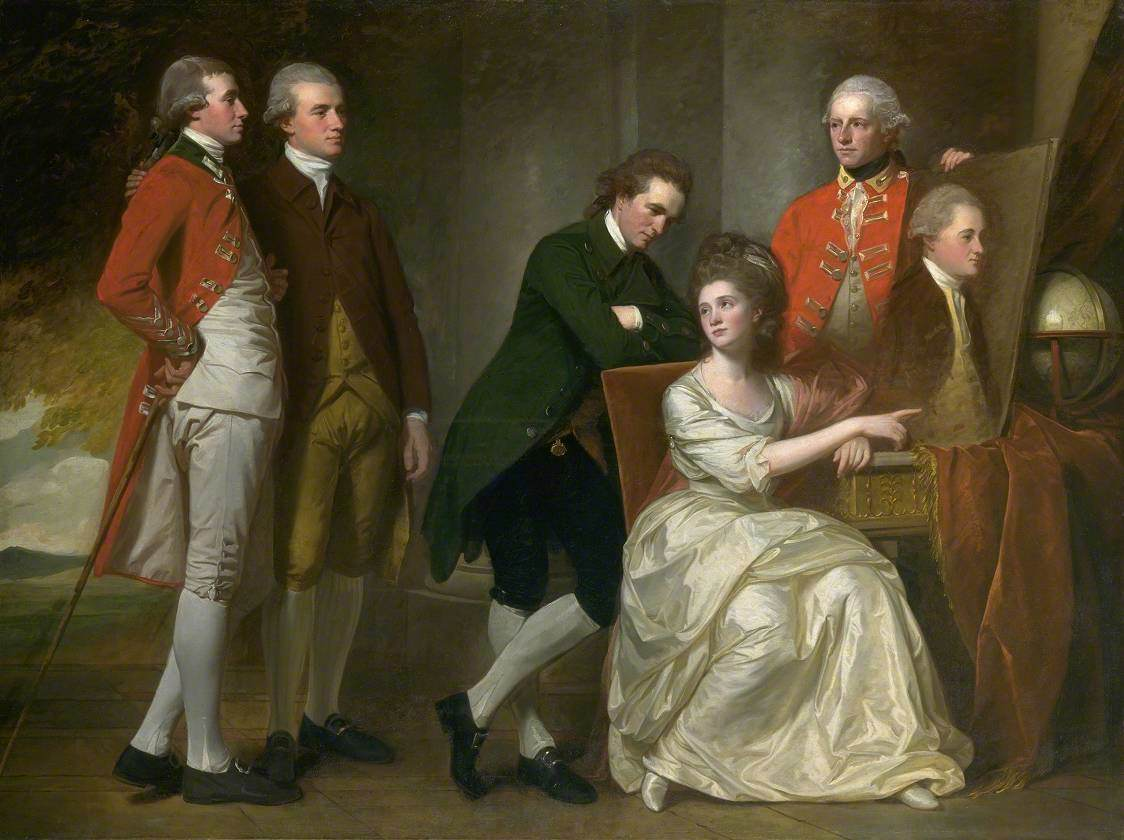
- The Beaumont Family, painting by George Romney, 1777-1779; General George Bernard is standing in a leaning posture over the back of the chair of his wife, Elizabeth Beaumont
- Died: 1820
- Military career
- Allegiance: Great Britain
- Branch: British Army
- Rank: General

General George Bernard (died May 1820) was a British Army officer.

== Military career ==
Bernard was appointed a captain in the 6th (Inniskilling) Dragoons on 7 July 1774 and then promoted to major in the 20th Light Dragoons on 3 December 1782 and to lieutenant colonel in the 86th Regiment of Foot on 8 April 1783.

He became Lieutenant-Governor of Kinsale and Charles Fort on 30 December 1786. He raised the 84th Regiment of Foot on 2 November 1793 and was appointed its lieutenant colonel commandant on 1 March 1794 before being promoted to full colonel on 15 March 1794. He was promoted to major-general on 14 May 1796, lieutenant-general on 1 October 1803 and to full general on 4 June 1813.

He lived at Heaton Lodge in Kirkheaton.
