= William Gardiner (British Army officer) =

British Army general

Lieutenant-General William Gardiner
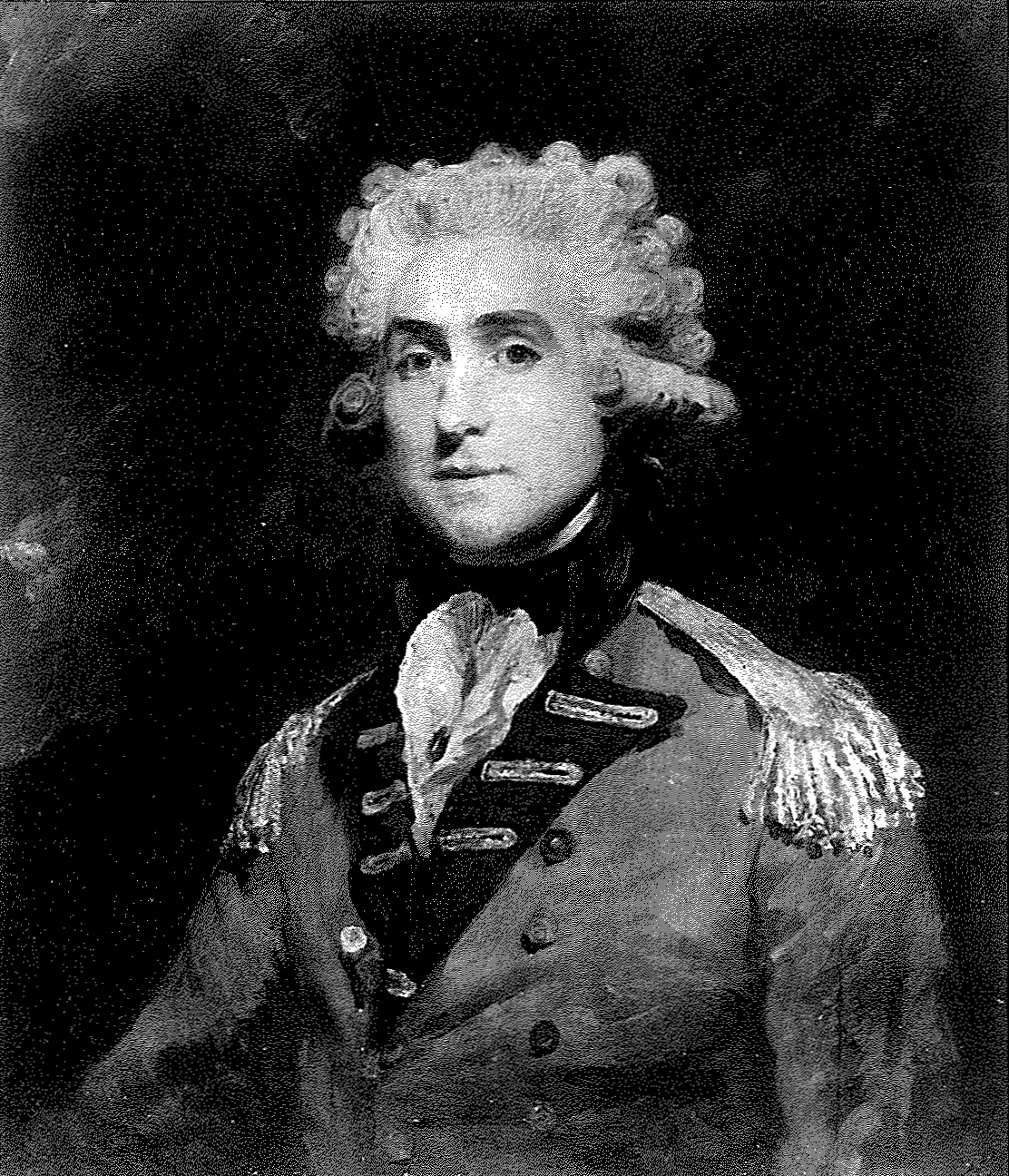
- Portrait by Sir Joshua Reynolds
- Born: 23 April 1748; Dublin, Kingdom of Ireland
- Died: 7 February 1806 (aged 57) Halifax, Nova Scotia
- Buried: St. Paul's Church, Halifax
- Allegiance: Great Britain; United Kingdom
- Branch: British Army
- Service years: 1767–1806
- Rank: Lieutenant-General
- Commands: 88th Regiment of Foot; 99th Regiment of Foot
- Spouse: Harriett Wrottesley (m. 1779)

Lieutenant-General William Neville Gardiner (23 April 1748 – 7 February 1806) was an Anglo-Irish army officer, diplomat, and politician. During a career that spanned the 1760s to 1800s, Gardiner was involved in major historical events including the American Revolution, Partitions of Poland, and unification of Great Britain and Ireland. During the American Revolution he served on the staff of Sir William Howe and later commanded a regiment of his own. In 1792 he was appointed Minister Plenipotentiary to Poland and served in that role until the breakup of the country in 1795. Gardiner returned to Ireland in 1798 and in 1800 sat in the last Parliament of Ireland before the creation of the United Kingdom of Great Britain and Ireland. His final appointment came in 1805 when he was made the commander-in-chief of the British forces in Nova Scotia and New Brunswick. Gardiner held this position only briefly and died in Nova Scotia in 1806.

== Biography ==
=== Early life ===
William Neville Gardiner was born on 23 April 1748 in Dublin to Charles Gardiner (1720–1769) and Florinda Norman (1722–1812). Charles was the son of Luke Gardiner (d. 1755), a landholder and politician, and Anne Stewart. Anne was the granddaughter of William Stewart, 1st Viscount Mountjoy, and after the death in 1769 of her cousin the 3rd Viscount (William Stewart, 1st Earl of Blessington), Charles Gardiner inherited the Stewart estates. Charles and Florinda had five children:

1. Luke Gardiner, 1st Viscount Mountjoy (1745–1798)
2. Anne Gardiner (1746–1829)
3. William Neville Gardiner (1748–1806)
4. Robert Gardiner (1749–????)
5. Florinda Gardiner (1760–1830)

In 1795, the Viscount Mountjoy title was recreated for Luke Gardiner. When Luke was killed in the Battle of New Ross in 1798, the title passed to his son, Charles John Gardiner (1782–1829), who was later created the 1st Earl Blessington. Anne Gardiner married William Trench, 1st Earl of Clancarty, and was styled lastly as the Countess of Clancarty.

=== Military service ===
William's military career began on 31 December 1767, when he was gazetted cornet in the 18th Light Dragoons. On 31 March 1770 he received his first command, a company of the 45th Regiment of Foot. In 1775-76 Gardiner fought with the 45th in the Boston Campaign of the American Revolution. During the campaign he served as the aide-de-camp to Sir William Howe, 5th Viscount Howe, and brought home the dispatches after the Battle of Long Island. Howe said of him that "Capt. Gardiner was always the first in the field and the last to leave it." Gardiner was later promoted to Major in the 10th Regiment of Foot, with whom he fought in the Philadelphia campaign of 1777. On 28 June 1778 he was wounded during the Battle of Monmouth.

Gardiner was subsequently appointed Lieutenant-Colonel of the 45th Regiment of Foot and returned to England. In January 1782 he was promoted to Colonel was given command of the 88th Regiment of Foot. In February 1783 he was given command of the 99th Regiment of Foot, although his duties as the aide-de-camp to the Lord Lieutenant of Ireland precluded him from joining the regiment. The 99th was disbanded when the Treaty of Paris was signed on 3 September 1783, and at this time Gardiner was put on half pay.

Colonel Gardiner remained half pay until 1789, when he was sent to the Austrian Netherlands during the revolution. He reported on the condition of Fortress of Luxembourg. He was stationed at Brussels until 1792.

=== Years in Poland ===
Gardiner spent most of the 1790s in Poland and played a significant role in the conflicts during the Second Partition of Poland and Third Partition of Poland. On 5 January 1792, Gardiner succeeded Daniel Hailes as the minister-plenipotentiary in Poland, having been recommended by his friend James Bland Burges. Gardiner did not arrive in the country until 13 October of that year. His first task was to repair Britain's strained relations with King Stanislaus Augustus and his brother, Michał Jerzy Poniatowski. In the Kościuszko Uprising, he assumed the role as the "unofficial leader of the diplomatic corps in Warsaw" and held regular meetings with the King. During the 4 November 1794 Battle of Praga, Gardiner sheltered 300 refugees in his home. Later, he attempted to escort the King to his exile in Grodno in January 1795. On 26 January, the King wrote his final official letter, which was to Gardiner:

The part you have acted near my person, which is verging towards the grave, and no hope being left me of ever seeing you again, there remains for me, at least, one important ? – from the very bottom of my soul to big you eternal farewell; to the last moment of my life, I shall bear you in my heart; and I hope we shall meet again in a place, where honest minds, and righteous souls, will be united forever. All that belongs to the etiquette of Courts, has been so much deranged, by my unfortunate fate, that, probably, neither I nor you will be able to observe its usual forms. But my heart shall ever remain true. I love and revere your King, and your nation – you will be so good as to inform them of it. Ever shall it remain a certain truth that I wish you to preserve your affection for your friend – unable to converse with you myself, my picture must supply its place.

Gardiner responded to the King:

The letter which your Majesty did me the honor to write to me, on the 18th instant, from Grodno, and which I received yesterday, has moved me, even to tears; and I still feel the inward sensations it has caused, and which it is impossible for me to utter. I return your majesty infinite thanks for the present you have sent me ?, I set a double value upon it, because on the one hand, it comes from your Majesty's own hands; and on the other, because it so much resembles you. However, Sire, I did not need any thing to recall you to my memory. The image of your Majesty, the excellence of you character, your particular kindness to me, and your misfortunes, Sire, are so deeply engraved in my heart, that they never will be effaced from it. I wish that just Heaven may, in future, give your Majesty a destiny worthy of your virtues, and that it may re-establish in your mind the tranquility which is necessary, after so many storms. My prayers Sire, are always for the welfare of your Majesty; and I humbly intreat you to think now, and the, of a person who will always preserve the sentiments of the most profound reverence, and the most perfect esteem towards, you. May it moreover please you Sire, to accept of the assurance of the real attachment, with which I have the honor to be Sire, Your Majesty's, Gardiner.

While he was in Poland, in April 1794 Gardiner was promoted to Major-General. On 6 March 1795 he was appointed to the general staff in Corsica, and on 21 March was given command of a newly raised 99th Regiment of Foot, which he retained until the regiment was disbanded in 1797. Whether he ever went to Corsica or saw the 99th is unclear. Due to his personal debts, Gardiner was detained in Warsaw until late 1797 or early 1798.

=== Later appointments ===
By 1799 Gardiner had returned to Dublin. Gardiner stood for the Irish House of Commons at Clogher, but was declared not duly elected on 3 February 1800. He was then returned for Thomastown on the interest of Lord Clifden, and was sworn on 8 May 1800. His service as a Member of Parliament was brief, as the last meeting of the Parliament of Ireland before the Union was on 2 August that year. He held the sinecure post of Governor of Kinsale from 1801 until his death.

In Dublin, commander in chief, Lord Charles Cornwallis described him "like Lake in manner, but graver." He commanded the 60th Regiment of Foot during the British anti-invasion preparations of 1803–05.

In 1805, Gardiner was appointed commander-in-chief in Nova Scotia and New Brunswick. He died in Halifax, Nova Scotia the following year and is buried in the crypt of St. Paul's Church, Halifax.

== Personal life ==
On 9 January 1779, Gardiner married Harriet Wrottesley (1754–1824). Harriet was the daughter of Sir Richard Wrottesley, 7th Baronet (1721–1769) and Lady Mary Leveson-Gower (1717–1778). William and Harriet had five children:

1. Gertrude Florinda (1779–1864); m. John Charles Clarke; m. Hon. Charles Tollemache
2. Charles (1780–1818); m. Anna Beresford
3. Harriet (1781–????) m. Robert Patrick
4. Frances (1783–1860)
5. Mary (1786–1851); m. Charles Holland Hastings

During his time in Poland, Gardiner also had by an Irishwoman named Lucy O'Moore a daughter, Eliza Lila (1784–1849). After he left Poland, Lucy and Eliza were cared for by the Czartoryski family. Eliza married Arthur Bourne White (1788–1856) and had a son, Sir William Arthur White (1824–1891), who later became a diplomat and ambassador. Sir William and his wife Katherine Marie Kendzior (1840–1902) had two children: Lila Lucy Catherine Mary (1867–1941) and Neville William Arthur Philip Hugh (1870–1953).

== See also ==
- List of ambassadors of the United Kingdom to Poland
