= Musketeer Regiment von Trümbach =

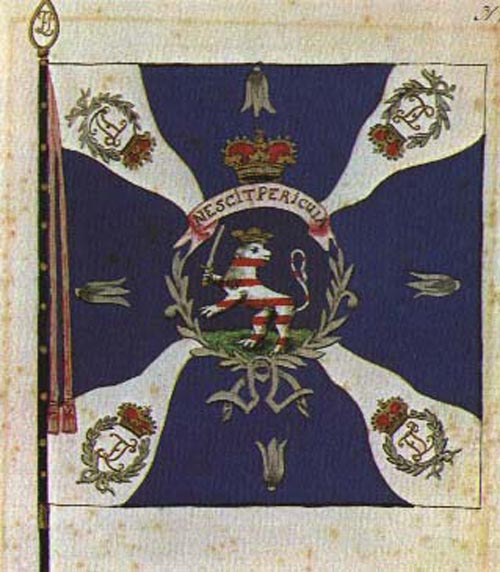
- Colors of Regiment von Trümbach.
- Active: 1701-1919
- Country: Hesse-Kassel; Electorate of Hesse; Kingdom of Prussia
- Allegiance: Hessian Auxiliaries of the British Army during the American Revolutionary War
- Type: Infantry
- Engagements: Battle of Stono Ferry Battle of Eutaw Springs Capture of Savannah Siege of Charleston Battle of Guilford Court House Siege of Yorktown

Depiction of Regiment Von Bose, circa 1780s

Regiment Von Trümbach (from 1778 known as Regiment Von Bose) was a regiment from the Landgraviate of Hesse-Kassel that fought alongside Britain in the American Revolution. It became Second Battalion, Regiments Prinz Carl von Hessen in 1789; Second Battalion, 3rd Hessian Infantry Regiment in 1821; and was known as First Battalion, 3. Hessian Infantry Regiment Nr. 83 of the Prussian Army from 1866. From 1889 it was part of Infanterie-Regiment von Wittich (3. Hessisches) Nr. 83.

== American Revolutionary War ==
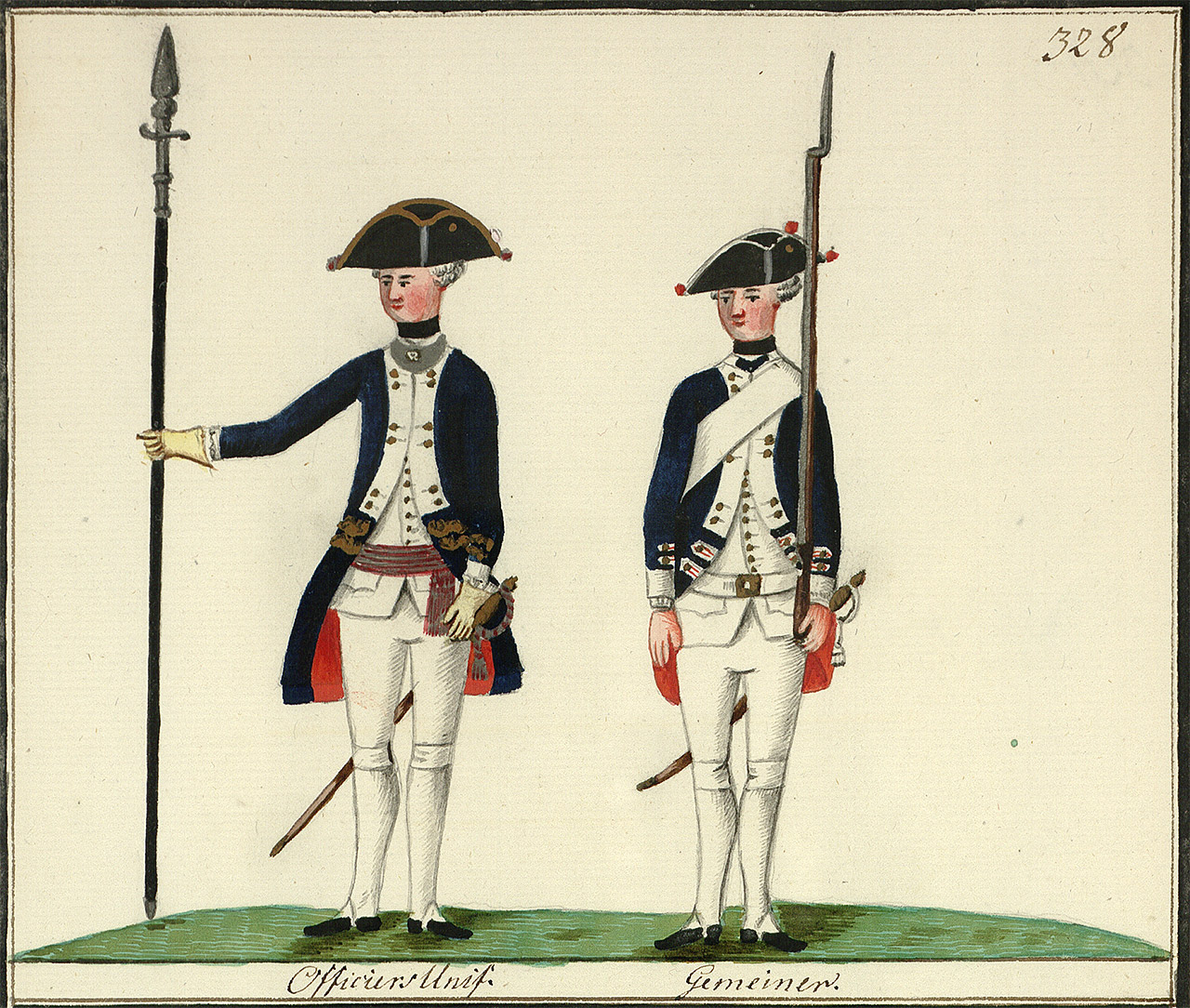
Uniform of Regiment von Bose.

Due to the number of conflicts Britain was involved with globally at the time the American Revolution broke out, Britain found itself in need of more troops to quell the rebellion. As was the custom of the time, it signed a treaty with several German Principalities to essentially lease their armies for the duration. These troops, from several German states were commonly referred to as Hessians, because the largest block of troops came from the Landgraviate of Hesse-Kassel. The total number of German troops committed to the conflict eventually reach about 33,000- almost a full third of the total Crown forces. The Hesse Cassel army was based on the Prussian army of the time and was among the most professional in Europe. The 8th infantry regiment came to the American shores as the Regiment von Trümbach and changed names a couple years later when Carl von Bose became the regiment's Chef, or commander. Von Trümbach/Bose participated in many of the major events of the war, including the actions in New York, Stono Ferry, Eutaw Spirings, Savannah, Charleston, Guilford Courthouse and Yorktown. At Guilford Courthouse the regiment received special note for its bravery as they fought back-to-back to battle foes on both sides. The main body of the regiment surrendered with Cornwallis's army at Yorktown. The Grenadier company remained in New York and returned to Hesse Cassel from there. Regiment von Bose was raised as the Regiment von Shöepping and served with distinction in the Seven Years' War as the Regiment von Mansbach. The red neck stocks worn by the regiment signify it is a veteran regiment.

== See also ==
- List of British units in the American Revolutionary War
- Hessian (soldiers)
