= Joel Holmes =

English recipient of the Victoria Cross

- Born: c. 1821; Halifax, West Riding of Yorkshire
- Died: 27 July 1872 (aged 50–51); Halifax
- Burial place: All Souls Cemetery, Halifax
- Military career
- Allegiance: United Kingdom
- Branch: British Army
- Rank: Private
- Units: 84th Regiment of Foot
- Conflicts: Indian Mutiny
- Awards: Victoria Cross

Joel Holmes VC (c. 1821 – 27 July 1872) was an English recipient of the Victoria Cross, the highest and most prestigious award for gallantry in the face of the enemy that can be awarded to British and Commonwealth forces.

== Details ==
He was about 36 years old, and a private in the 84th Regiment (later The 2nd Battalion, York and Lancaster Regiment), British Army during the Indian Mutiny when the following deed took place on 25 September 1857 at Lucknow, India for which he was awarded the VC.

Private Joel Holmes
For distinguished conduct in volunteering to assist in working a gun of Captain Maude's Battery, under heavy fire, from which gun nearly all the artillerymen had been shot away. (Extract from Field Force Orders of the late Major-General Havelock, dated 17 October 1857.)

== The medal ==
His Victoria Cross is displayed at The York & Lancaster Regiment Museum at Rotherham, South Yorkshire, England.
