= Governor of Kinsale =

British military appointment

The governor of Kinsale was a military officer who commanded the garrison at Kinsale and Charles Fort in County Cork. The office became a sinecure and in 1833 was to be abolished from the next vacancy.

== List of governors of Kinsale and Charles Fort ==
=== Governors ===
- 1690: Charles Churchill
- 1693: The Earl of Inchiquin
- 1719: Lord Harry Powlett
- 1723: Humphrey Gore
- 1726: Gervais Parker
- 1739–1740: John Ligonier
- 1749: Robert Frazer
- Philip Anstruther
- 1759–1764: John Folliott
- 1765–1770: The Earl of Drogheda
- 20 March 1770: James Gisborne
- 8 September 1770–1801: The Lord Rossmore
- 1801–1806: William Neville Gardiner
- 1806–1819: Sir Cornelius Cuyler
- 1819–1827: Sir David Baird
- 1827–1830: William Guard
- 1830–1849: Sir Warren Marmaduke Peacocke

=== Lieutenant-governors ===
- c. 1697: James Waller (died 1702)
- Henry Hawley (died 1724)
- 1724: George Bate
- 1725: Gervais Parker
- 1747–1759: John Folliott
- –1776: Nicholas Price
- 1776– : Sir Francis James Buchanan
- 1783–1786: John Hancock
- 1786–1789: George Bernard
- 1789–1827: Arthur Browne
- 1827–1829: Sir William Inglis
- 1829–1833: John Sulivan Wood
