= 90th Regiment of Foot (Yorkshire Volunteers) =

- Active: 25 October 1779 – 1784
- Country: Kingdom of Great Britain (1777–1800)
- Branch: British Army
- Type: Infantry

Commanders
- Colonel of the Regiment: Gen. Loftus Anthony Tottenham

The 90th Regiment of Foot was a line infantry regiment of the British Army during the American Revolutionary War.

== History ==
The regiment was raised in Yorkshire in October 1779 and was posted to the Leeward Islands under the command of General Loftus Anthony Tottenham, arriving in January 1780.

It returned to England in 1783 and was disbanded in Yorkshire the following year.
