= Whaleboat War =

Privateer activity in American Revolutionary War

The Whaleboat War was a series of actions fought by American privateers in the aftermath of the British victory at the Battle of Long Island and in the context of the subsequent Northern theater of the American Revolutionary War after Saratoga. The Americans used whaleboats rowed from New Jersey into New York Bay and from Connecticut into Long Island Sound to capture and disrupt British commercial shipping, occasionally making raids on the coast of British occupied Long Island. They quickly sold their prizes, dividing their profits with the financier (persons or company) and the state.

== See also ==
- Culper Ring
- Meigs Raid
