= 94th Regiment of Foot (1780) =

- Active: 1780–1783
- Country: Kingdom of Great Britain
- Branch: British Army
- Type: Line Infantry
- Role: Infantry
- Size: One battalion
- Engagements: Anglo-Spanish War

The 94th Regiment of Foot was a British Army regiment formed in England in October 1780. It was placed on garrison duty in Jamaica in 1781 during the Anglo-Spanish War and then returned to England. The regiment was disbanded in England in 1783.
