= 99th Regiment of Foot (Jamaica Regiment) =

Former infantry regiment of the British Army

The 99th Regiment of Foot (Jamaica Regiment) was an infantry regiment of the British Army, raised in 1780 by Charles Rainsforth and disbanded in 1783.

It was raised in the Midlands for service in the West Indies, and spent three years (1780 to 1783) stationed in Jamaica as a garrison unit before being returned to England to be disbanded.

Lieutenant General Robert Skene was Colonel of the Regiment from 1781 to 1783. William Neville Gardiner became a colonel the following year.
