= 91st Regiment of Foot (Shropshire Volunteers) =

- Active: 1 November 1779–1784
- Country: Kingdom of Great Britain (1779–1784)
- Branch: British Army
- Type: Line infantry

Commanders
- Colonel of the Regiment: Colonel Dudley Ackland

The 91st Regiment of Foot (Shropshire Volunteers) had a brief existence as a British Army infantry regiment between 1779 and 1784. It was raised in Shropshire, posted to the West Indies, where much property was destroyed in a hurricane, and disbanded in 1784.

The Colonel of the regiment throughout its life was Colonel Dudley Ackland.
