= 84th (York and Lancaster) Regiment of Foot =

- Active: 1793–1881
- Country: Kingdom of Great Britain (1793–1800); United Kingdom (1801–1881)
- Branch: British Army
- Type: Infantry
- Size: One battalion (two battalions 1793–1795, 1808–1819)
- Garrison/HQ: Pontefract Barracks, Yorkshire
- Nicknames: The Young and Lovelies; The Tigers
- Engagements: French Revolutionary Wars; Third Anglo-Maratha War; Napoleonic Wars; Indian Rebellion

The 84th (York and Lancaster) Regiment of Foot was a regiment in the British Army, raised in 1793. Under the Childers Reforms it amalgamated with the 65th (2nd Yorkshire, North Riding) Regiment of Foot to form the York and Lancaster Regiment, with the 84th becoming the 2nd Battalion, in 1881.

== History ==
=== Formation ===
The regiment was raised at York by Lieutenant Colonel George Bernard as the 84th Regiment of Foot, in response to the threat posed by the French Revolution, on 2 November 1793. A short-lived 2nd Battalion was raised in March 1794. The 1st Battalion was sent to join the Duke of York's army in the Netherlands in September 1794 as part of the unsuccessful defence of that country against the Republican French during the Flanders Campaign. Returning to Britain in the spring of 1795, both battalions of the 84th were posted to the Cape of Good Hope in 1795 where they were amalgamated. From South Africa, the regiment was sent to Madras in India in 1798 and on to Bombay in February 1799.

=== Napoleonic Wars ===
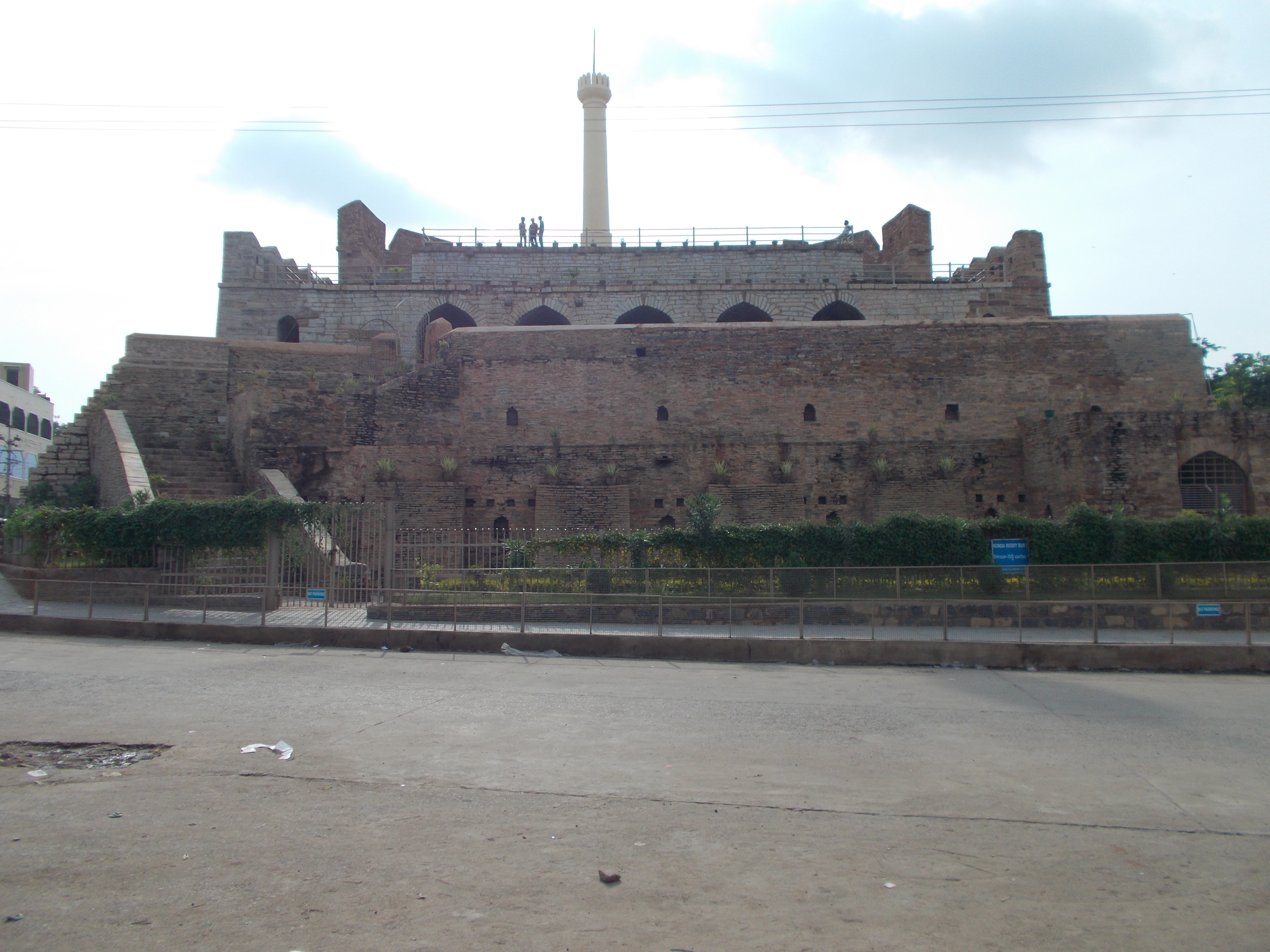
The Kondareddy Buruju fort at Kurnool, captured by the regiment in 1815

A second battalion was raised again in May 1808 and the regiment became the 84th (York and Lancaster) Regiment of Foot (reflecting the fact that the 1st Battalion had been raised in Yorkshire and the 2nd Battalion had been raised in Lancashire) in January 1809. The 1st Battalion was sent to the French held island of Mauritius in the Indian Ocean where they participated in the capture of the island in 1810. After this the battalion served in Bangalore for the next four years. From there they were involved in the recapturing of Kurnool in 1815 and against the Mahratta princes in the last stages of the Third Anglo-Maratha War. The battalion returned to England in 1819 where it absorbed the 2nd Battalion.

Meanwhile, the 2nd Battalion took part in the disastrous Walcheren Campaign in autumn 1809. The battalion embarked for Portugal for service in the Peninsular War in August 1813. Pursuing the French Army into France, it saw action at the Battle of the Bidassoa in October 1813, the Battle of Nivelle in November 1813 and the Battle of the Nive in December 1813. The battalion returned to England, where it was absorbed by the 1st Battalion in 1819.

=== The Victorian era ===
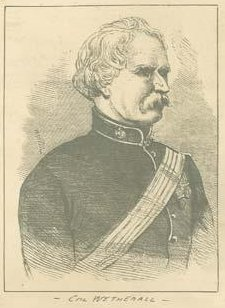
George Wetherall, Colonel of the Regiment during the Indian Rebellion

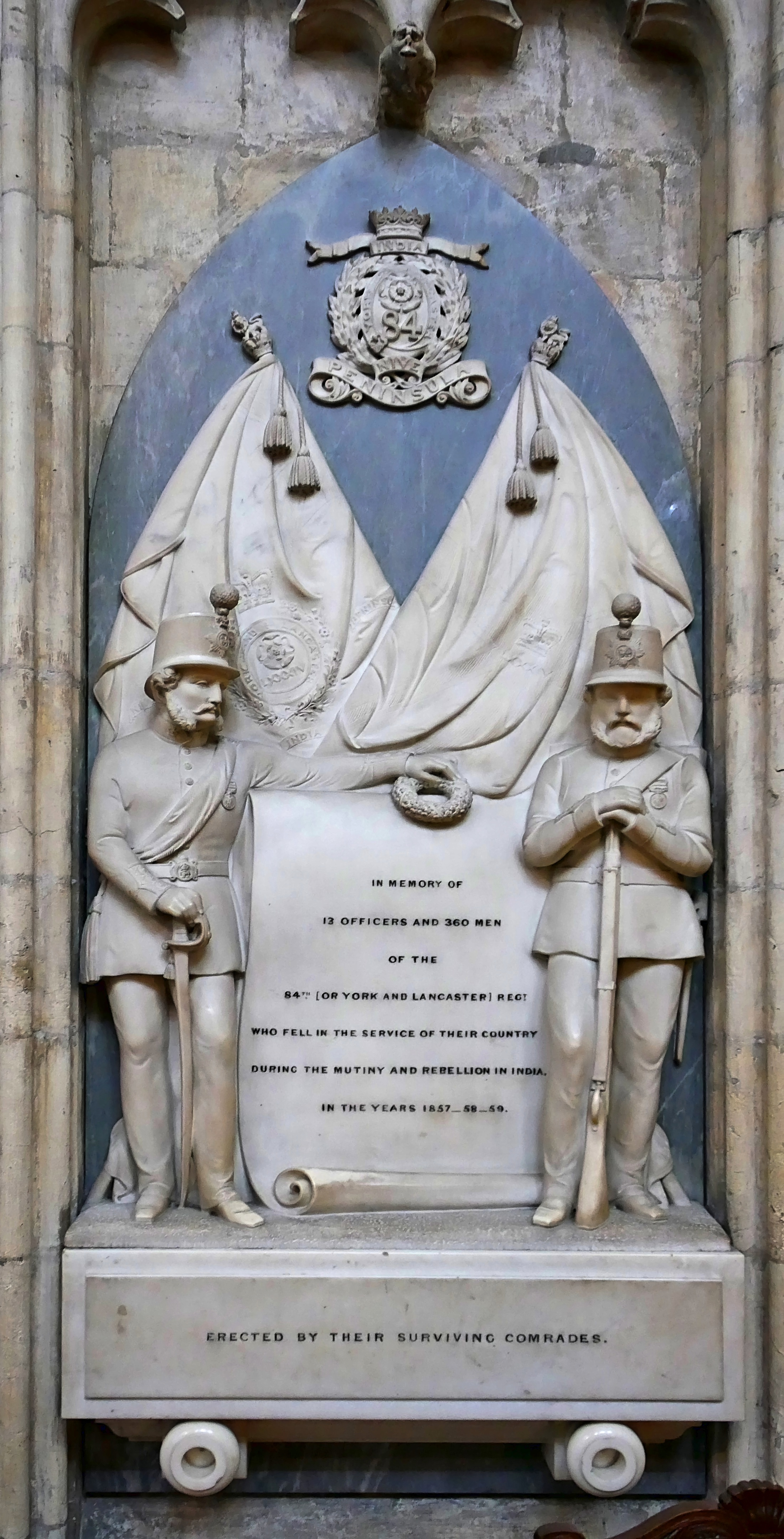
Memorial inside the York Minster

Detachments boarded HMS Dromedary and HMS Coromandel as escorts for convicts bound for Van Diemen's Land and New South Wales in 1820. Both ships continued to New Zealand to harvest kauri trees for use as spars for first rate (98 gun) Royal Navy warships. Two officers and a detachment of the regiment remained on HMS Dromedary for the eleven-month expedition to the Bay of Islands and Whangaroa. The battalion was sent to Jamaica, where it helped quell the slave riots, in 1827. The regiment remained in the West Indies until 1839 when it returned home.

The regiment was sent to Burma in 1842 and to India in 1845. The regiment was involved in the Siege of Cawnpore and the Relief of Lucknow during the Indian Rebellion. General James Outram wrote of the regiment:

A private letter is hardly a proper medium for giving expression to the strong feelings I bear to the glorious old 84th, but the feelings I do bear it are very strong, and every officer, non-commissioned officer and private of the Corps is, and ever shall be, my comrade and my friend!

After Cawnpore and Lucknow were recaptured the regiment was involved in the protection of the countryside under Brigadier John Douglas who wrote:

I did not think of the smallness of my force opposed to three separate bodies, each doubling it, when I remembered it was the 84th I had with me!

The regiment was the only formation ever to receive a salute from the battery at Fort William, Calcutta and received that acclaim when it left India in 1859. It was deployed to Malta in 1865 and to Jamaica in 1867 before going on to Halifax, Nova Scotia in 1870. It returned home in 1871.

As part of the Cardwell Reforms of the 1870s, where single-battalion regiments were linked together to share a single depot and recruiting district in the United Kingdom, the 84th was linked with the 65th (2nd Yorkshire, North Riding) Regiment of Foot, and assigned to district no. 7 at Pontefract Barracks in Yorkshire. On 1 July 1881 the Childers Reforms came into effect and the regiment amalgamated with the 65th (2nd Yorkshire, North Riding) Regiment of Foot to form the York and Lancaster Regiment, with the 84th becoming the 2nd Battalion.

== Victoria Crosses ==
The 84th Foot had six Victoria Crosses awarded to men serving in its ranks all won during the Indian Mutiny :

- Captain Augustus Anson
- Lance-corporal Abraham Boulger
- Private Joel Holmes
- Sergeant-major George Lambert
- Private Patrick Mylott
- Corporal John Sinnott

== Battle honours ==
Battle honours won by the regiment were:

- Peninsular War: Nive, Peninsula
- India, Lucknow

== Colonels of the Regiment ==
Colonels of the Regiment were:

=== 84th Regiment of Foot ===
- 1794–1820: Gen. George Bernard

=== 84th (York and Lancaster) Regiment of Foot - (1809) ===
- 1820–1822: Gen. Sir George Townsend Walker, Bt, GCB
- 1822–1823: Maj-Gen. Sir Denis Pack, KCB
- 1823–1840: Gen. Sir Fitzroy Jeffries Grafton Maclean, Bt
- 1840–1854: Gen. Sir Loftus William Otway, CB
- 1854–1868: Gen. Sir George Augustus Wetherall, GCB, KH
- 1868–1872: Gen. Thomas Wood
- 1872–1881: Gen. Sir David Russell, KCB

== Sources ==
- Creighton-Williamson, Donald (1968). The York and Lancaster Regiment. Great Britain: Leo Cooper.
