= American Volunteers =

- The Battle of Kings Mountain, at which the American Volunteers were virtually annihilated as a fighting force
- Active: 1779-1780
- Country: Great Britain
- Branch: British Army
- Type: British provincial unit of infantry (auxiliary troops)
- Size: company (150)
- Garrison/HQ: Long Island, Province of New York
- Engagements: American Revolutionary War: Siege of Charleston (1780); Battle of Monck's Corner; Battle of King's Mountain (1780)

Commanders
- Notable commanders: Major Patrick Ferguson

The American Volunteers were a British Loyalist unit during the American Revolutionary War.

== Company formed ==
British Army Major Patrick Ferguson raised the "American Volunteers" in 1779 in the Province of New York.

== Campaigns ==
In 1780, the Volunteers were sent to the Siege of Charleston. On 2 May 1780 they captured the redoubt at Haddrell's Point. The Battle of King's Mountain resulted in the death of Major Ferguson and the unit's virtual annihilation.
