= 88th Regiment of Foot (1779) =

- Active: July 1779 – 1783
- Disbanded: 1783
- Country: Kingdom of Great Britain
- Branch: British Army
- Type: Infantry
- Size: 900
- Engagements: American Revolutionary War

Commanders
- Colonel: Thomas Keating (1779–1783)
- Lieutenant-Colonels: Sir Alexander Leith (1779–1780) Henry Phipps (1780–1782) William Gardiner (1782–1783) Charles Gunter Legge (1783)

The 88th Regiment of Foot was an infantry regiment in the British Army from 1779 to 1783, formed during the American Revolutionary War. It was raised in Worcestershire under Colonel Thomas Keating and saw service in Jamaica. It was disbanded in England in 1783 at the end of the war.

== History ==
The 88th Regiment of Foot was an infantry regiment raised by Lieutenant Thomas Keating, a half pay officer from the 42nd Regiment of Foot, in July 1779. Keating became the regiment's first and only colonel on 12 October, at the time of which the regiment was 762 men strong. (Note: Keating's colonelcy was only a temporary rank, and he continued to be a substantive lieutenant.) Sir Alexander Leith was assigned as the regiment's lieutenant-colonel, with seven captains, a chaplain and an adjutant under him.

The regiment was sent to serve in the West Indies on 6 November, consisting at the time of 900 men. Having arrived at Jamaica as escort to an artillery train, the 88th joined the command of Major-General John Vaughan on 7 December. It was expected that Vaughan would attempt to attack Puerto Rico, or to retake Grenada, Dominica, or St Vincent. Leith died at Jamaica on 3 October 1780 whilst preparing to command an expedition to the Spanish Main and was replaced by Lieutenant-Colonel Henry Phipps. Disease impacted all ranks of the regiment, and recruiting officers were sent to find more men, some of whom were taken from prison hulks stationed in North America. Lieutenant-Colonel William Gardiner took over from Phipps on 9 January 1782. Still at Jamaica on 1 March, the regiment had decreased in size to only 394 men, of which 142 were sick.

Some time after this the 88th returned to England. Gardiner was promoted to colonel on 28 February 1783 and replaced by Lieutenant-Colonel Charles Gunter Legge. Under Keating and Legge the regiment was disbanded later on in the year.

== Uniform ==
The regiment wore yellow facings, which sources describe as either pale yellow or bright yellow. The regiment's red coats were accompanied by white breeches and waistcoats. Officers wore lace and buttons made from silver, while that of the rank and file is not recorded. It is likely that the regulation uniform was modified when the regiment began to serve in the hotter clime of the West Indies.
