= King's American Regiment =

- Active: 1776–1783
- Country: Great Britain
- Branch: British Army: associators; British provincial unit; regiment (as 4th American Regiment of Foot)
- Type: auxiliary infantry and artillery
- Size: regiment (1,000)
- Nickname: 4th American Regiment of Foot
- Engagements: American Revolutionary War: Attacks on Fort Clinton and Fort Montgomery (1777); Carolinas Campaign (1780-1781); Siege of Charleston (1780); Raid on Newport (1781); Raid on Richmond (1781); Georgia Campaign (1781); East Florida Campaign (1781)

Commanders
- Notable commanders: Lieutenant General Sir Henry Clinton Colonel Edmund Fanning

The King's American Regiment, also known as the "Associated Refugees", were a Loyalist regiment during the American Revolutionary War. They were raised in 1776 and fought for the British in various battles during the war and were disbanded in 1783.

== History ==
The King's American Regiment was raised on Staten Island in the Province of New York in December 1776 by Colonel Edmund Fanning as the "Associated Refugees". Originally recruitment to the King's American Regiment was open to all but in 1777, an order was made to dismiss all "negroes, mollatoes (sic), and other Improper persons who have been admitted into these corps" due to it being deemed an "Abuse". It served in the 1777 attacks on Fort Clinton and Fort Montgomery, the Southern Campaign 1780–1781, the 1780 Siege of Charleston, the 1781 raids on Newport and Richmond, Virginia, and the 1781 Campaigns in Province of Georgia and East Florida.

The regiment was brought into the American Establishment, on 7 March 1781, and renamed the "4th American Regiment of Foot". The regiment later joined the British Regular Army, on 25 December 1782, possibly as the "110th Regiment of Foot", and was disbanded in the Province of Canada in 1783.

== Uniforms ==
The King's American Regiment wore the regular British Army uniform of red coats with blue facings, with their buttons being marked "RP" for Royal Provincials. The regiment's King's Colour was produced locally, opposed to other British regiments that had them made in Great Britain but it was not known if they had a Regimental Colour. The Colours were made of repurposed silk and had irregular placements for the flag of Great Britain. Uniquely for British regiments at the time, it had two separate emblems on either side. One side bore an Eye of Providence while the other side bore the lettering "K.A.R." for "King's American Regiment" or "King's Associated Refugees".
