= Kingstree jail fire =

Deaths in custody, South Carolina, 1867

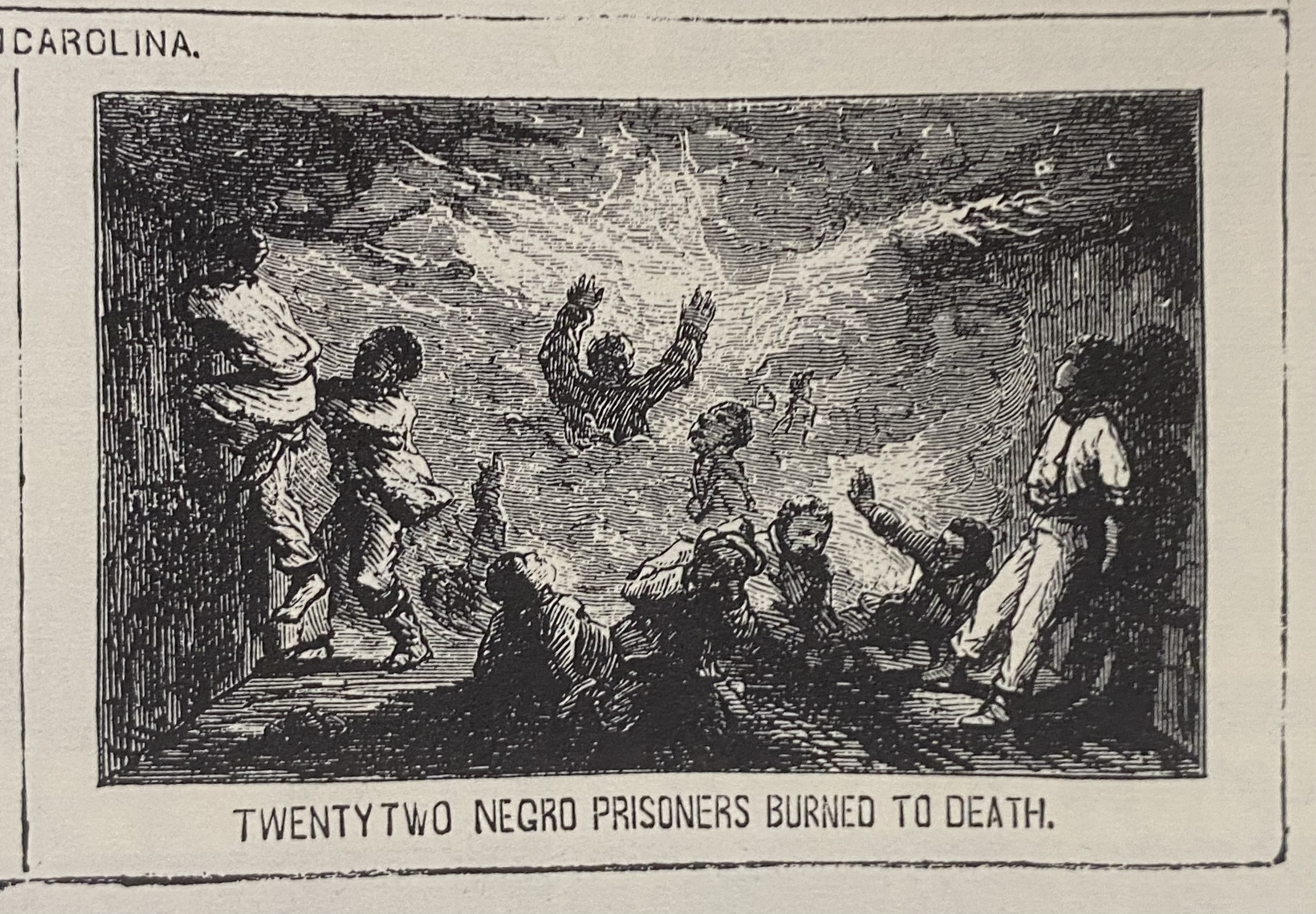
- "Twenty-Two Negro Prisoners Burned to Death," detail of Southern Justice (Thomas Nast, Harper's Weekly, March 23, 1867)
- Date: January 7, 1867
- Time: 8 p.m. (EST)
- Location: Williamsburg County Jail Kingstree, South Carolina
- Type: Building fire
- Cause: Unknown
- Perpetrator: Unknown
- Deaths: 22
- Injuries: 1 smoke-inhalation injury
- Property damage: Four-story building destroyed
- Arrests: 3
- Convicted: 0
- Charges: Reckless negligence, murder
- Trial: April 10–12, 1867
- Verdict: Not guilty

The Kingstree jail fire killed 22 prisoners on the evening of Monday, January 7, 1867, in the Williamsburg County seat of Kingstree, South Carolina, United States. One white prisoner escaped the building and survived, but all of the African-American prisoners, incarcerated on the third floor, were killed. Attempts to rescue the 19 men and 3 women left in the building were ineffective. By the time action was taken, the billowing smoke and heat were overwhelming.

The cause of the fire was never made public. Some sources speculate that the prisoners caused the fire, while others contest this claim. More than half a century after the fact, a book on local history alleged the fire was started by the building's solitary white male prisoner, who was reportedly in jail for unpaid debts. He may have had permission to roam the building unencumbered, while the freedmen (jailed for assorted non-violent charges) were kept upstairs behind locked doors.

There was apparently a marked delay in obtaining the jail keys and attempting a rescue, such that the U.S. Army had the responsible parties arrested and imprisoned. All three, Sheriff Samuel P. Mathews, deputy Jacob S. Beck, and assistant James P. Barrineau, were acquitted on charges of negligence and murder by a jury in a Williamsburg County court.

== Background ==
Kingstree is located on the South Carolina coastal plain, along the banks of the Black River, (Note: The Black River is a blackwater river that runs the color of tea or coffee, due to tannins leached out of the bald cypresses that grow within and alongside the river.) about 70 mi (110 km) north of Charleston. The Williamsburg district, (Note: For an excellent outline of historic South Carolina districts and county boundary changes, see Newberry Library's "Individual County Chronologies" in South Carolina Atlas of Historical County Boundaries (2009).) roughly bounded on the northeast by the Lynches River and on the southwest by the Santee River, was first colonized by the British, as part of the Province of South Carolina. During the American Revolutionary War Francis Marion regularly used the area for guerrilla operations. The region has a great deal of low-lying wetland, and thus endemic malaria. For most of the 19th century, agriculture in South Carolina was dominated by large-scale cotton and rice plantations owned by whites and worked by blacks. Williamsburg County was also a timber region and hosted turpentine distilleries. Slavery in South Carolina was widespread, even relative to other slave states, and the region had a black majority throughout the 18th and 19th centuries. By the start of the American Civil War, almost half of white families owned slaves. In 1860, there were 5,187 whites, 43 "free colored" people, and 10,259 enslaved people living in Williamsburg County.

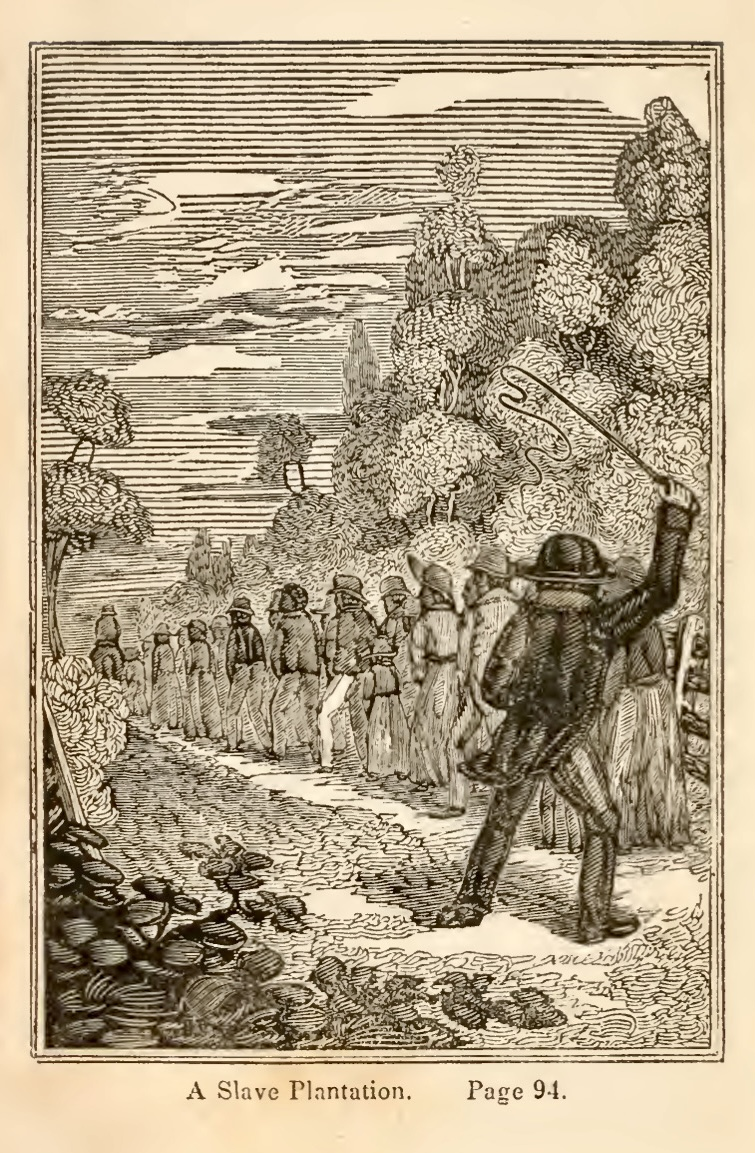
"A Slave Plantation" (Picture of Slavery in the United States of America by Rev. George Bourne, 1834)

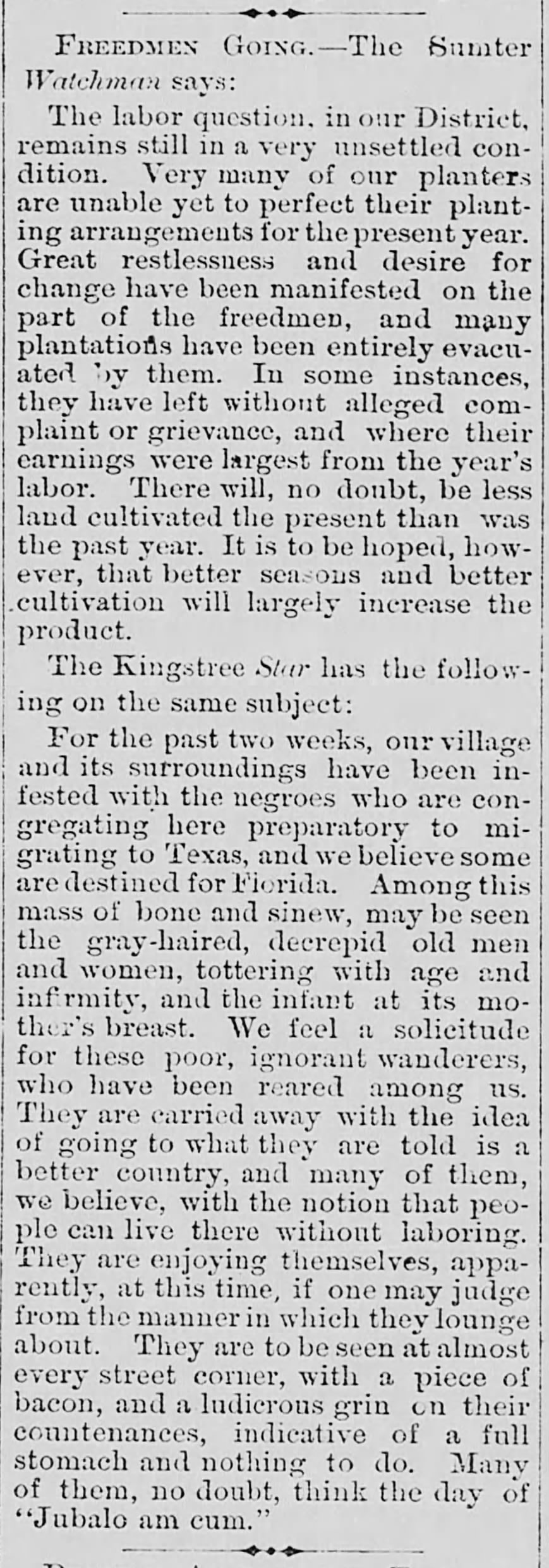
"Freedmen Going": The Daily Phoenix of January 20, 1867, reprinted news items from Sumter and Kingstree about the "unsettled" labor situation in the region

Following the military defeat of the Confederacy, the country entered a period known as Reconstruction, and the freedmen of Kingstree began organizing as laborers. The white plantation owners were colluding to depress the wages they now had to pay agricultural workers; in turn, the black men and women of the Williamsburg District began holding mass meetings "to decide upon a plan for offsetting the scheme." The freedmen threatened to "migrate to Florida if they could not obtain 'reasonable and just' terms." According to Reconstruction historian Eric Foner:

A federal officer investigating reports of impending insurrection in Kingstree, South Carolina, concluded that exaggerated fears 'spring from dread, on the part of the planters, of the freed people asserting their rights of manhood.' Blacks bearing arms or, as at Kingstree, marching 'with red colors flying' to demand better contract terms, symbolized the revolutionary transformation in social relations wrought by emancipation.

Over the course of winter 1865 and into 1866 the whites of Williamsburg County feared a violent insurrection by the formerly enslaved people, who constituted 57 percent of the state population. Due to an idea now known as Haitianism, conservative southerners of the era believed that "our negro slaves, who had been kind, faithful and true to us during the war," might well be transformed by the Emancipation Proclamation into "the savages that impaled white babies and raped their mothers in Santo Domingo." An army officer was sent to the area to investigate and "his final report was a scathing attack on the mayor and council for acting like 'frightened old women' and unnecessarily alarming the whites of the area." The whites had reported "an increase in night religious services by blacks." A citizens' committee was formed, and ended up assaulting at least a dozen freedmen, driving two Yankee schoolteachers out of town, and conducting an undercover operation to elicit a list of grievances from local freedmen. According to the Freedmen's Bureau records: "Sixteen of the most vocal blacks were chased down, beaten, and accused of planning mass murder." The following year, 1866, South Carolina governor James Orr received additional reports of an imminent uprising.

The anti-black violence in Williamsburg County was part of a widespread revanchist movement in South Carolina: "...vigilantes killed numerous African Americans during Reconstruction. Northern newspapers and magazines provided extensive coverage of the white on black violence, and it checked white aggression to a certain extent." More substantially, South Carolina and all other secessionist states (except Tennessee) were subject to continued occupation by the U.S. Army under the Reconstruction Acts; South Carolina was in the Second Military District. Partly as a result of ex-Confederate anxiety, a garrison was placed in Kingstree under the command of Lieutenant Ross.

== Fire ==
The Williamsburg County Jail was inspected on January 6, 1867, by the sheriff and Lieutenant Ross, who found everything to be in working order. According to the Charleston Daily News, a change in jailors was scheduled for the following day—the day of the fire; the old jailor, James P. Barrineau, was no longer in residence but "had not yet surrendered the keys to Mr. [Jacob] S. Beck, the new jailor."

According to the Kingstree Star, the fire was first noticed between 8 and 9 p.m. on the evening of January 7, when an unidentified person heard a "rumbling noise in the upper stories of the jail, as if the iron gates were being shaken, and immediately following by the cry of fire." The Charleston Daily News reported that "the fire was discovered by a negro, who reported it to Mr. Beck."

Information was immediately sent Mr. Barrineau; but on his arrival he stated that he could not surrender the keys without the authority of the Sheriff, and could not take the responsibility of releasing the prisoners. At this time nothing was observed but a small smoke, and the delay did not seem dangerous. On the arrival of the Sheriff who deemed it advisable to have the sanction of the Lieutenant commanding, and that officer was sent for. He advised the speedy opening of the jail, and the first door was opened, but the smoke rushed out in such torrents that it was impossible to enter...It has been a most unfortunate occurrence and, happening at a time when the country is torn by intestine feuds, a construction may be placed upon it by the Radical party to answer their own ends...It is a source of great regret that by a strict adherence to the red-tape principle so much valuable time was lost, and when the preliminaries were finally settled it was too late to do more than witness the destruction of the building.

— Charleston Daily News, January 10, 1867

A 1923 history of the county claimed that the fire had been started "sometime in the night," by the one white prisoner housed in the building, in an attempt to burn a hole through the wall and escape. Contemporary accounts regarding the lone survivor conflict slightly in details: According to the Kingstree Star, a civilian named M. McBride entered the building and unlocked the second-floor "room" of Robert H. Flinn, "a white man...confined on bail process." The Daily News also reported, "The white man who escaped is at present in the custody of the United States soldiers and as his trial will take place next week some facts may be elicited that are at present unknown." Sheriff Mathews, Lieutenant Ross, and McBride apparently entered the building together, but Mathews and Ross were forced out by the heavy smoke, and only McBride was able to get to Flinn. According to the Kingstree Star, McBride "twice fell by suffocation before he reached the foot of the staircase", with the Charleston Daily News adding that "his humanity nearly cost him his life, as he was insensible for one and a half hours as consequence of having inhaled the smoke."

Once it was determined that it was impossible to enter the building from the ground floor, "nearly all the citizens of the village" and the U.S. Army soldiers in the town garrison attempted a rescue from outside. The Kingstree Star described "strenuous efforts...with the assistance of ladders, to remove the grating from one of the windows, which proved ineffectual" but that "Joe and William Blakely (coloured) particularly excited our commendation" for their rescue efforts. Private William Green "mounted a ladder at the most perilous crisis, and ascended to a window on the third storey," and "passing up an axe, called to the negroes to break down the bars and escape; one of them took the axe, but exclaiming, 'It is too late!' fell backwards in the smoke."

The cause of the fire was unknown. According to the Charleston Daily News, "It originated on the second story, apparently between the floor and ceiling. As the negroes were not allowed the use of fire, the whole affair is wrapped in mystery...None of the negroes were confined for serious crimes, except one for murder, in whose room it is supposed the fire originated." This assertion conflicts with the list of victims reported by the Kingstree Star, which makes no mention of murder, rather the people killed were jailed for burglary (3), stealing cotton, stealing cattle (9), fence burning, "resisting officer", "for the peace and resisting officer", stealing a mule, receiving stolen goods (3), and stealing rice.

The four-story building, which had no water, ladders or other fire-safety precautions, was destroyed ("only a shell remains"). The clouds of dense smoke that rose above the town were visible for miles.

The Charleston Mercury, the newspaper owned by Robert Barnwell Rhett, one of the political Fire-Eaters of South Carolina, and edited by his son R. Barnwell Rhett Jr., published a brief, vivid, and graphic account that was dated January 9 and suggested the dead inmates were responsible for the fire:

Their shrieks and screams as they were gradually shut off from all hope of escape were sickening to the helpless spectators, and with the hissing and crackling of the flames, which seemed to take a savage delight in their work, formed a scene that, in horror, might have rivaled Pandemonium itself. In a very short time the cries and groans ceased, and of the 22 negroes nothing was left but a charred, blackened and shapeless mass. It is supposed that the jail was fired by the negroes in the hope of making their escape, but their efforts only worked out their entire destruction. (Note: Pandemonium)

On January 29, a Pennsylvania newspaper published an unsourced allegation that the fire had been arson. The Nation said the deaths were the result of an "inhuman hesitation" on the part of the jailer and the sheriff. John Schreiner Reynolds, librarian of the Supreme Court of South Carolina, said in his 1905 book Reconstruction in South Carolina that "according to the newspaper accounts given at the time, [the fire was] caused by the act of some of the negro prisoners who thus endeavored to escape." A book-length history of Williamsburg County published in 1923 claimed that there had been 27, not 22, fatalities.

== Casualty list ==
Kingstree jail fire deaths, 1866
Name	Charge
Josiah Alston	stealing rice
Lunnon Brown	cow stealing
Nelson Brown	burglary
Doctor Graham	cow stealing
Ellis Graham	burglary
Julius Graham	burglary
Louisa Graham	receiving stolen goods
Nancy Graham	fence burning
Harry Scott	for resisting officer
Lewis Scott	for the peace and resisting officers
John Sessions	receiving stolen goods
John Shaw	cotton stealing
Charles Singletary	cow stealing
Jack Speights	receiving stolen goods
Nias Speights	cow stealing
Wesley Speights	cow stealing
Charles Tisdale	cow stealing
Cyrus Tisdale	cow stealing
John Tisdale	cow stealing
Minda Tisdale	cow stealing
Sam Witherspoon	mule stealing

== Investigation and trial ==
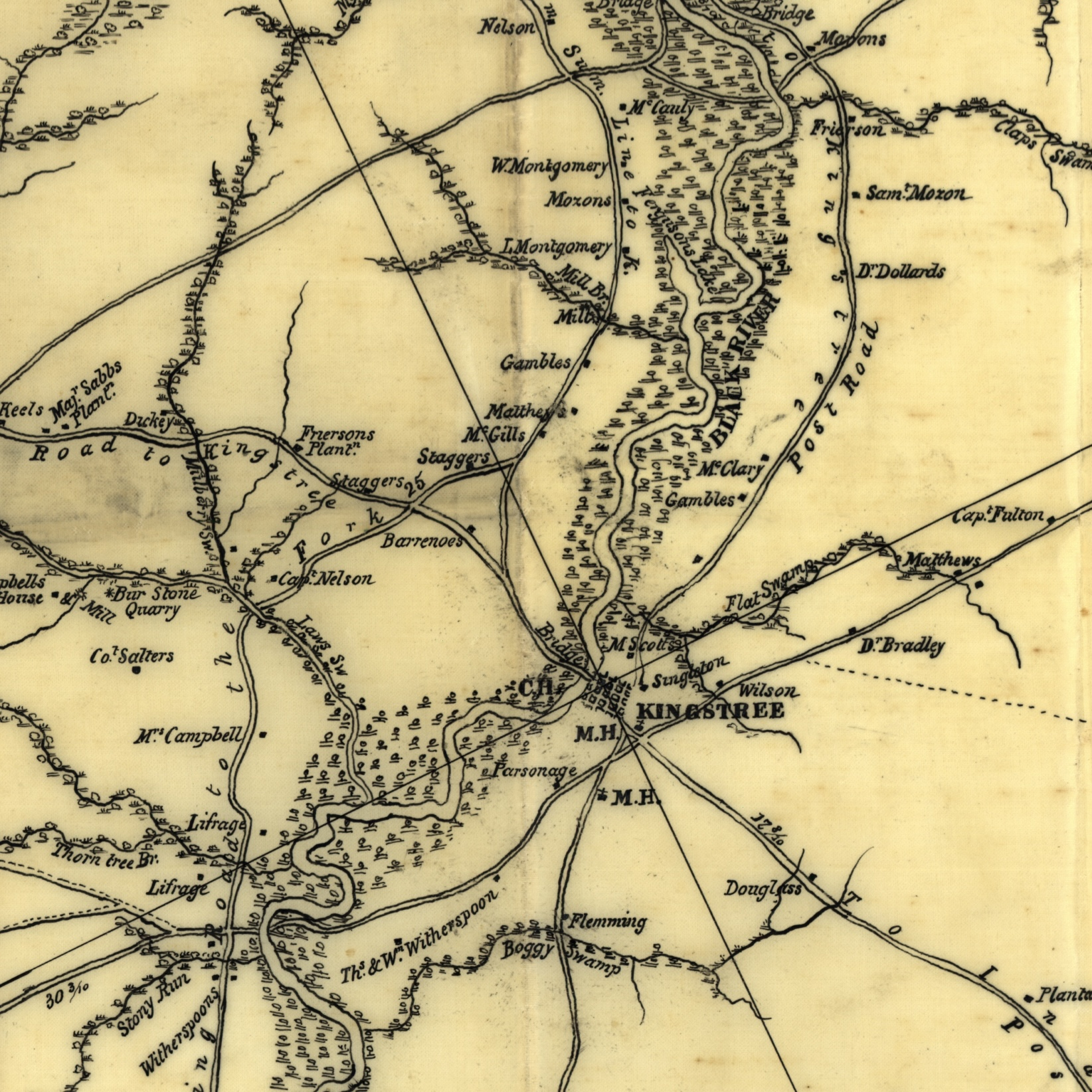
U.S. Army map of the Kingstree area during the American Civil War

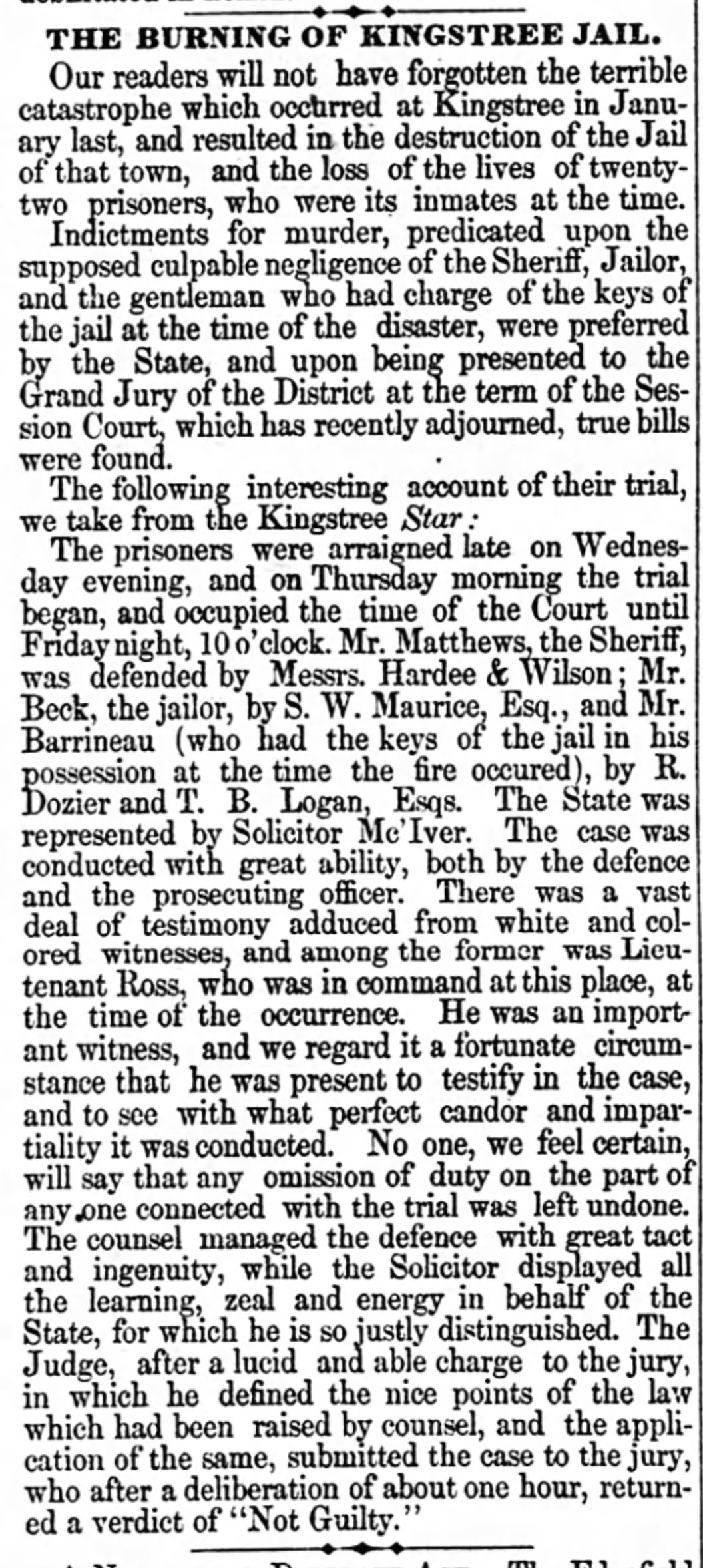
Account of the trial published in the Kingstree Star, reprinted in the Yorkville Enquirer, York, S.C., April 25, 1867

According to a January 10 letter from Capt. Cloud and Brig. Gen. H. K. Scott that was reprinted in the Congressional Record:

The article states that the jailer, who had the keys, refused to open the doors without the authority of the sheriff, and the sheriff refused to act without the orders of the lieutenant commanding the troops at Kingstree. This statement presents a degree of barbarity that would appear incredible except in a community where no value is placed upon the lives of colored citizens. The general commanding directs that you cause an immediate and thorough investigation of this affair; that in the meantime you arrest the sheriff and jailer, and if the facts prove to be as stated, that you hold them in military confinement under the charge of murder until the civil authorities shall be ready and willing to try them.

Portions of three bodies were all that was left for investigators to examine. Edward J. Porter was foreman of the coroner's jury. Texas B. Logan was district judge and also acting coroner. The report of the coroner's jury report found that:

the fire originated between the ceiling overhead of the second and the floor of the third story; that it was communicated by some of the prisoners confined in the jail but whether communicated by accident or design the jury are unable to agree upon any conclusion. We further find that had the jailor been in his proper place at the jail and with the keys in his possession when the jail was first discovered to be on fire and when the alarm had first been given the three women and perhaps more of the prisoners could have been saved and that for this neglect and dereliction of duty the sheriff and jailor are censurable.

On January 18, the U.S. Army arrested the county sheriff on charges of "criminal carelessness and neglect of duty." The sheriff, his deputy, and the assistant were arrested while at work at the district court, and were confined in Castle Pinckney in Charleston harbor. Beck, the jailer, and Barrineau, who had the keys that night, were held at Castle Pinckney for 13 days before being released into local custody on January 30.

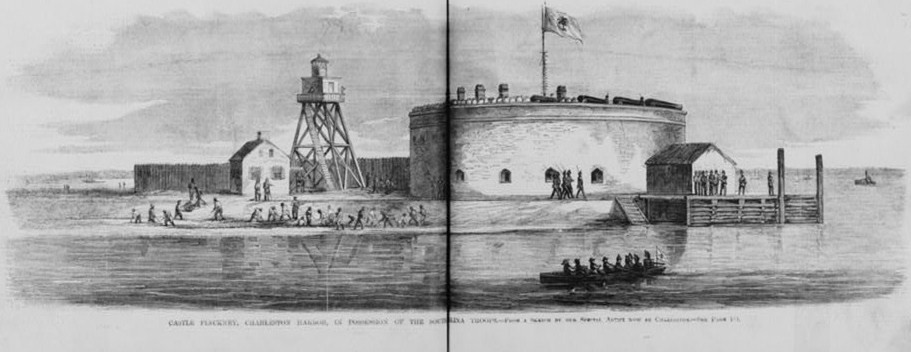
View of Castle Pinckney c. 1861

The three county officials (sheriff, deputy, and assistant) were arraigned on murder charges on April 10, and tried on April 11–12. The county judge at the time may have been John G. Pressley or Charles W. Wolfe Sr. All three defendants were acquitted on April 12, 1867, by a jury that deliberated for an hour beginning at 10 p.m. Responses to the verdict varied, with a newspaper in Ohio reporting in May:

It will be recollected that twenty-two freedmen were burned to death in the Kingstree jail last January. The sheriff, jailor and assistant were indicted and tried for their murder and have just been acquitted. The idea of convicting a man in South Carolina for burning up a score or so of "niggers"! Preposterous!

While recent scholar of Reconstruction said that:

The postbellum order disturbed whites that heretofore benefited from a caste system built upon the foundation of slavery. [South Carolina] white elites turned to the courts for help in controlling black labor. Whites were rarely arrested and tried for murders committed during extralegal incursions against African Americans, and when they were put on trial, the jury nearly always failed to convict whites implicated in violence against blacks.

== Legacy ==
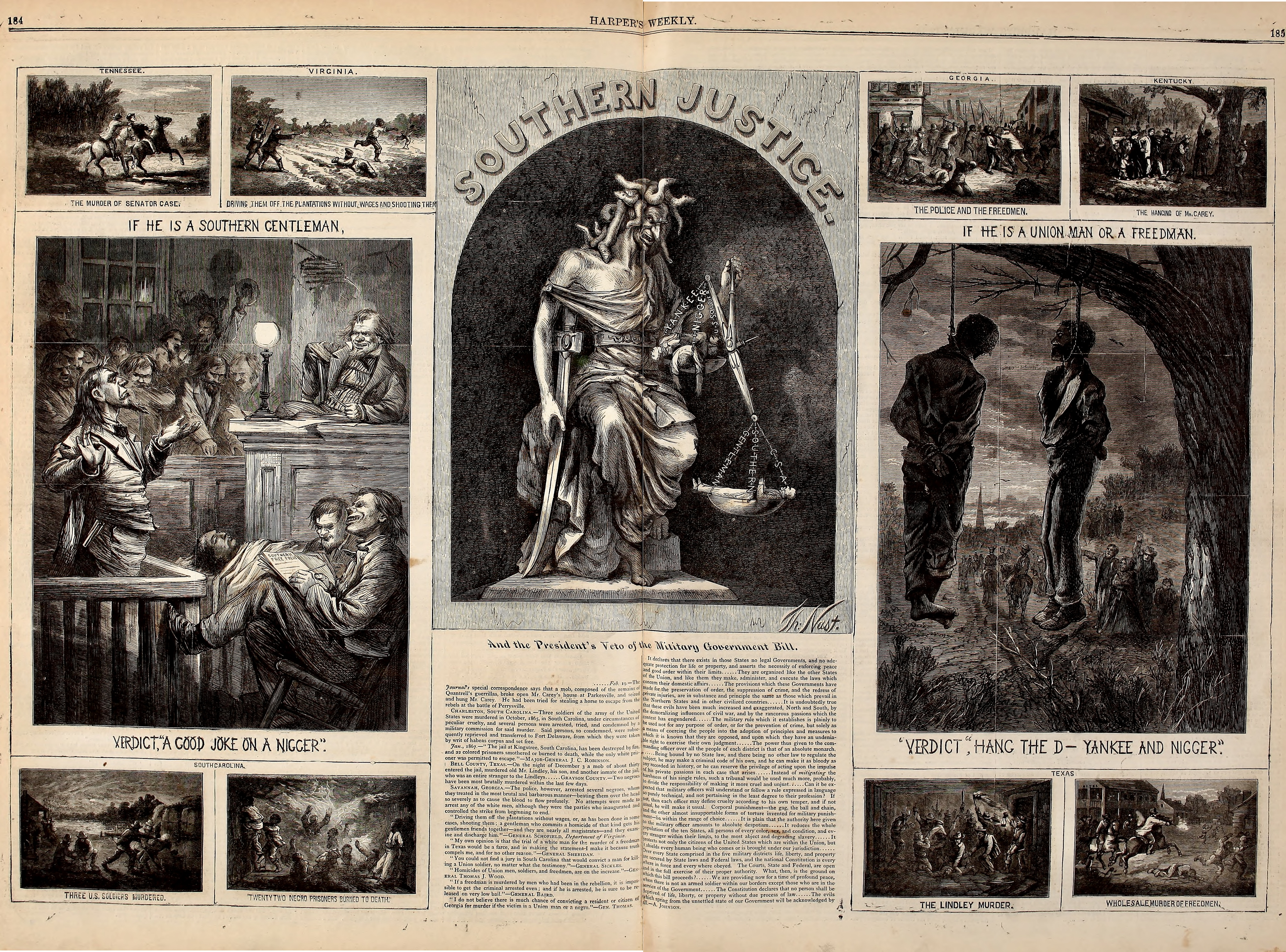
Southern Justice depicted a Medusa-headed Andrew Johnson and quoted from his military reconstruction veto message

A Thomas Nast cartoon called Southern Justice (published in the March 23, 1867, issue of Harper's Weekly) advocated for continued military occupation of the defeated Confederacy, and included an artist's imagined depiction of the scene inside the third-floor cells. The text of the cartoon included a quote from General John C. Robinson stating that "...the only white prisoner was permitted to escape."

Black activist Frances Ellen Watkins Harper visited Kingstree on a lecture tour and mentioned the jail fire in a letter dated July 11, 1867:

It was a very sad affair. There was only one white prisoner and he got out. I believe there was some effort made to release some of the prisoners; but the smoke was such that the effort proved ineffectual. Well, for the credit of our common human nature we may hope that it was so.

In November 1867, Stephen A. Swails "gave notice of a bill to regulate drawing of juries in Williamsburg County." The county had desegregated juries in 1869.

According to the 1923 history, the county had no dedicated jail for almost eight years after the fire. Following the construction of a new county jail building, a grand jury empaneled in 1875 reported that "there has been a great negligence upon the part of those charged with the custody of criminals and offenders against public peace and welfare." The grand jury's report listed three suspicious escapes: Bill Shaw, "convicted of a grave offence and sentenced to the penitentiary"; Charles Cooper, charged with murder, removed from jail "without sufficient authority or warrant of the law, and carried to the Salters Depot on the North Eastern Railroad and there allowed to escape"; and Tom James, jailed on larceny charges, who was allowed "outside the prison walls without a guard." The grand jury concluded:

These various instances of escape mark a course on the part of the officers of the law that seems to the Grand Jury to be criminally negligent and the public welfare demands, and the good order of government requires, that a strong investigation into the conduct of these public servants be made.

== See also ==
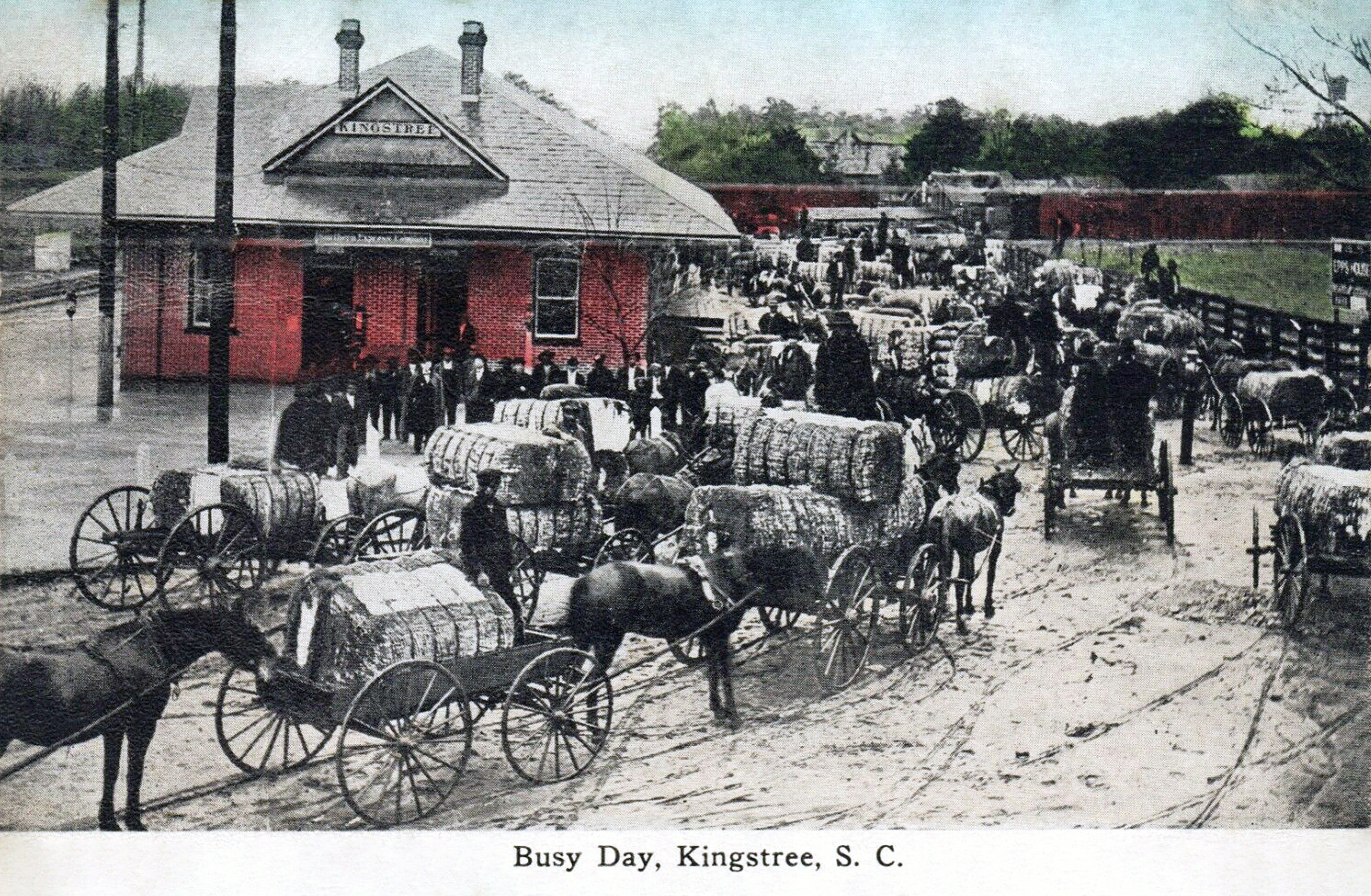
Bringing cotton to market via the Kingstree depot, c. 1910

- Thomas P. Bailey § "Racial creed of the Southern people"
- District of Columbia Suffrage Act (passed January 7, almost simultaneously with the fire)
- South Carolina Ku Klux Klan Trials of 1871-1872
- Red Shirts (United States)
- Lynching of Frazier B. Baker and Julia Baker (neighboring county, 1898)
- Albert H. Olpin (anti-Mormon attack, 1903)
- List of disasters in the United States by death toll
