= Capitol Hill Parks =

Group of parks in Washington, D.C., United States

Capitol Hill Parks is an umbrella term for the National Park Service management of a variety of urban parks in Washington, D.C.

There are four key parks in the system:

- Folger Park, named after former Secretary of the Treasury Charles J. Folger;
- Lincoln Park, named after the sixteenth president, and by far the largest unit at 7 acres (28,000 m^{2});
- Marion Park, named after Revolutionary War leader Francis Marion;
- Stanton Park, named for Lincoln's Secretary of War, Edwin Stanton.

Additionally, a variety of smaller greenspaces are under the authority of this NPS area. The 59 circles and triangles included in Pierre L'Enfant's design of the city are overseen as part of this jurisdiction. Some of these include:

- Eastern Market Metro Station, approximate square of land formed by the Intersection of Pennsylvania and South Carolina Avenues, SE; D, 7th, and 9th Streets, SE; only the Pennsylvania Avenue median remains in NPS hands as the remainder was transferred to DC;
- Maryland Avenue Triangles;
- Pennsylvania Avenue Medians;
- Potomac Avenue Metro Station, around the intersection of Potomac and Pennsylvania Avenues, SE;
- Seward Square, named after William Henry Seward, the United States Secretary of State under Presidents Abraham Lincoln and Andrew Johnson;
- Twining Square, around the intersection of Pennsylvania and Minnesota Avenues, SE.
