= Henry Mouzon =

Continental Army officer (1741–1807)

William Henry Mouzon II
- Born: 18 May 1741; Mouzon Plantation, South Carolina, United States
- Died: 25 August 1807 (aged 66)
- Military career
- Allegiance: Continental Army; South Carolina Militia
- Service years: 1777-1780
- Rank: Lieutenant, captain
- Unit: 3rd South Carolina Regiment
- Conflicts: Battle of Black Mingo

Henry Mouzon II (May 18, 1741 – August 25, 1807) was a colonial-era American patriot and civil engineer. He served as an officer of the Continental Line and as a militia officer in Francis Marion's Brigade, where he distinguished himself in the Battle of Black Mingo.

== Early life ==
Mouzon’ s family was of French Huguenot ancestry. His parents were William Henry Mouzon, I (born 1713) and Anne Videau. The family immigrated to Mouzon, South Carolina which is located in present-day Williamsburg County. Their son William Henry II was born on May 18, 1741, at the Mouzon Plantation. William Henry II spoke fluent French. Following his father's death in 1749, eight-year-old Henry II was sent to France to further his education.

== Family life ==
Mouzon married Susannah Taylor on January 10, 1769, at Black Mingo, South Carolina. Henry and Susannah were the parents of 10 children: Ann, Peter, William Henry III, Samuel Ruffin, Susannah Videau, Sarah Elizabeth, Mary Bonneau, Henry Videau, Edward, and James.

== Service in the Revolutionary War ==
Mouzon's life is closely connected to that of his first cousin and closest friend, General Francis Marion, the "Swamp Fox." Francis and Mouzon served together as lieutenants under Colonels Montgomery and Grant in the colonial campaigns against the Cherokee Indians. Mouzon was commissioned by the Continental Congress as a lieutenant in the Continental Army in 1777. He served in the Third South Carolina Regiment until the fall of Charleston, South Carolina to the British on May 12, 1780. Soon after the fall of Charleston, the British sent three armies from the city to establish garrisons of soldiers in every thickly-settled community in the province. In support of this effort, the Legion of Lieutenant Colonel Banastre Tarleton was sent from Georgetown, South Carolina to Camden, South Carolina by way of Kingstree. Tarleton burned Mouzon's plantation, reportedly because Mouzon was a French Huguenot; this marked the only action of Tarleton's in this campaign of which Cornwallis approved.

When Mouzon's oldest daughter Nancy (Ann) died in 1859, at the age of 90, the Kingstree Star published her memory of the firing:

The subject of this memoir, then 11 years old, was on the roof of the smoke-house, aiding in spreading the bacon to the sun, and was the first to descry the approach of the enemy and give the alarm. Capt. Mouzon was then at home, and had just time to escape to the swamp and conceal himself. His daughter well remembered the personal appearance of Col. Tarleton and also of Col. Ball, his Tory ally, and the dress of the British troopers—leather cape with plumes, red coats, white pantaloons and half boots. The two officers approached Mrs. Mouzon courteously and told her with apparent regret that "Harry," meaning her husband, had turned against the King and must consequently be broken up. Orders were then given to set fire to the premises, and in a little time the family mansion and the out-houses, 14 buildings in all, were wrapt in flames.

Following the destruction of the Mouzon Plantation on August 7, 1780, the citizens of Williamsburg sent Major James to Georgetown, South Carolina to inquire of the British Commander, Naval Captain Ardesoif, of the conditions of their parole. James was informed by Ardesoif that the paroled officers of Williamsburg would be expected to take up arms against their countrymen. James left the meeting in a great state of agitation and returned to Williamsburg, where a battalion was organized under Captain Mouzon and several others. Mouzon and two other men left to find Colonel Francis Marion and bring him to Williamsburg to command the battalion. On September 14, 1780, Marion's forces attacked those of Colonel Cumming Ball at the Battle of Black Mingo Creek. Mouzon was severely injured in this battle; his injuries would affect him for the rest of his life.

== See also ==
- Battle of Black Mingo
