= Battle of Tearcoat Swamp =

1780 battle of the American Revolutionary War

- Part of the American Revolutionary War
Date	25 October 1780
Location	South Carolina, near Clarendon County 33.803°N 80.125°W
Result	American Victory

Belligerents
Great Britain	(United States) Patriot militia

Commanders and leaders
Samuel Tynes	Francis Marion

Strength
200	150

Casualties and losses
6 killed, 14 wounded, 23 captured	2 horses killed

The Battle of Tearcoat Swamp was a battle during the American Revolutionary War between Lieutenant Colonel Francis Marion's Patriot militia, and a Loyalist Militia led by Lieutenant Colonel Samuel Tynes. The battle took place on 25 October 1780 in present-day Clarendon County, South Carolina.

== Background ==
After the Battle of Camden and the subsequent defeat, and departure of the Continental Army from South Carolina, Francis Marion already a lieutenant colonel commanding the Williamsburg Militia in the Pee Dee area used his militia force of 20 to 70 men to harass enemy forces and disrupt supply lines. Marion and his militia operated primarily in South Carolina, between the Pee Dee and Santee Rivers throughout 1780. Unlike the regular army Marion's Militia used guerrilla warfare to engage and harass both the British Army and the Loyalist Militias in the area. Marion's Militia was made of citizens, farmers, and slaves from the surrounding countryside. Due to the lack of war materials available these men provided their own armaments, mounts and food. In return they were allowed to join the militia and leave freely at any time at their own discretion. In early fall Marion received correspondence from General Horatio Gates who encouraged him to continue his offensive. His confidence bolstered, Marion moved into the area of Brittons Neck, South Carolina. At first the citizens of the surrounding area did not respond to Marion's call to arms, however after threatening departure to North Carolina Marion was able to gather 152 men.

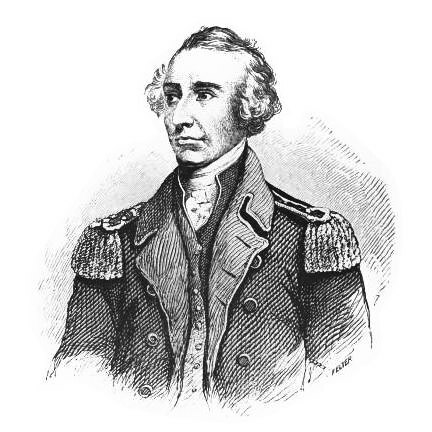
General Francis Marion

== Deployments ==
On October 24 Major General Nisbet Balfour ordered lieutenant colonel Samuel Tynes. to lead and train a loyalist militia in the High Hills area between Salem, SC and Nelsons Ford. The loyalists procured armaments and supplies from Camden, and marched to the area near Tearcoat Swamp. Colonel Tynes intended to strengthen his numbers and train the men in warfare. Tynes bivouacked his men in the fork of Black River effectively placing Tearcoat Swamp at his back, believing that it would shield his men from the enemy. Unbeknownst to the British a group of Marion's scouts had observed and reported the position of the loyalists. Upon hearing of the enemy movement Marion expressed that this was an excellent opportunity "to break up the party, before its newly made converts should become confirmed in the principles they had unwillingly adopted". Marion secretly decided to attack the loyalists at Tearcoat before they could muster anymore men. Marion remained silent about his plan of attack, and even his own men were unaware of the intended action. To further cover his plan, before departing Marion spread rumors that he and his men would march on McCallum's Ferry. Marion gathered his men and, left his camp at Kingstree on the morning of October 25 and led his 152 men towards Salem.

== Battle ==
After traveling all day, Marion arrived at Black River late at night and successfully forded his men through. Upon reaching the opposite bank, Marion sent (two?) young men to scout out the enemies position. The young men soon reported to Marion that only a few Loyalists were awake, playing cards. Overall the security of the Loyalist defenses were lax. Marion deferred his attack until midnight when he felt the enemy would be most vulnerable. Rousing his men shortly after midnight, Marion split them into three groups. He reused the same tactics that had won him victory at the Battle of Black Mingo: the attack would come in the form of a trident with groups attacking from the left, right and center(which Marion commanded himself). After taking positions, Marion signaled the attack with the discharge of his pistol, and the groups charged in on horses yelling and firing their weapons. To Marion's satisfaction the attack succeeded exactly as planned, as the Loyalists were caught completely by surprise. The battle ended after the first attack. The Loyalists sustained 6 dead and 14 wounded while another 23 were captured. Marion's force lost only two horses.

== Aftermath ==
The battle was a morale booster for Marion's militia. With the success of the attack the Patriots were able to capture supplies totaling over 80 muskets, a number of bridled and saddled horses as well foodstuffs. Many of the 23 Loyalists were astonished and impressed by Marion's troops as they had never been before resulting in a number of defections to the Patriot cause. To Marion's dismay Lieutenant Colonel Tynes was not among the captured as he as well as a few of the loyalists escaped into Tearcoat Swamp. Though the battle was a needed victory it was the second time that Marion had failed to capture a commanding officer within the Loyalists ranks, who he believed were the key to ending the Loyalist movement. Marion would later assign Captain William Clay Snipes to hunt down the loyalist leader which led to the eventual capture of Tynes. After the Battle of Tearcoat Swamp the Loyalist movement in the Salem area was nullified.
