= The Item =

South Carolina (USA) newspaper

- Type: Daily newspaper
- Format: Broadsheet; Online
- Owner: Osteen Publishing Co.
- Publisher: Vince Johnson
- Editor: Vince Johnson (editor)
- Founded: Oct. 15, 1894
- Language: English
- Headquarters: 36 W Liberty St., Sumter, SC, United States
- Circulation: approximately 20,000
- Website: theitem.com

The Item, formerly known as The Sumter Daily Item and The Daily Item, is an independent morning newspaper published in Sumter, South Carolina, five days a week (Tuesday to Friday), with a "Weekend Edition" delivered on Saturday mornings, by Osteen Publishing Company. It has a circulation of approximately 20,000.

== History ==
The paper, then called The Sumter Daily Item, was first published on October 15, 1894, by Hubert Graham Osteen. It previously had been operated as The Watchman and Southron (a merger of Sumter Watchman and True Southron). It was South Carolina's first small-town newspaper. Osteen served as the paper's editor and publisher until his retirement in 1946.

In 2008, the paper changed its Monday edition to a tabloid format before abandoning the Monday edition altogether. However, the paper's website is updated each Monday, with news and obituaries.

The paper covers Sumter, Lee and Clarendon counties, with a dedicated bureau located in Manning which publishes a weekly section, "The Clarendon Sun," each Tuesday. Lakeside, magazine covering the Sumter, Clarendon, Orangeburg, Berkeley and Calhoun County areas of Lake Marion is also published six times a year.

== Staff ==
=== Newsroom ===
CONTENT TEAM:

- News Editor Rhonda Barrick
- Features Editor Ivy Moore
- Sports Editor Dennis Brunson
- Senior Staff Writer Bruce Mills
- Staff Writer Adrienne Sarvis
- Staff Writer Jim Hilley
- Sports Writer Justin Driggers
- Archivist Sammy Way
- Newsclerk/Librarian Sandra Holbert

== See also ==
- Sumter News
