= Battle of Black Mingo =

1780 American Revolutionary War battle

- Part of the American Revolutionary War
Date	September 28, 1780
Location	Georgetown County, South Carolina 33°37′N 79°26′W
Result	Patriot victory

Belligerents
(United States) Patriot militia	(Kingdom of Great Britain) Loyalist militia

Commanders and leaders
(United States) Francis Marion	(Kingdom of Great Britain) John Coming Ball

Strength
50+	50+

Casualties and losses
2 killed 8 wounded	3 killed 13 wounded

The Battle of Black Mingo was a skirmish during the American Revolution. It took place in September 29, 1780 (Note: The date is reported as the 14th on the nearby South Carolina historical marker, but as the 28th by Chandler.) in the vicinity of Dollard's Tavern (also known as Red House) at Willtown near Rhems, South Carolina. General Francis Marion leading Revolutionary forces attacked and scattered a contingent of Loyalist troops that had been left to secure the region by British Colonel Banastre Tarleton after his destructive march through the area.

The Loyalists, under Colonel John Coming Ball, were driven into Black Mingo swamp after suffering significant casualties.

“Mingo” is a Chickasaw word for “chief.”

== Background ==
Following the defeat of General Horatio Gates’ Continental Army regulars by British forces at the Battle of Camden on August 16, 1780, organized military opposition to British occupation all but ceased in the South.

In the aftermath of the British victory, armed Loyalist contingents of between 200-250 men were deployed to secure the countryside to suppress Patriot guerrilla activity, including that of General Francis Marion’s irregular fighting units. On September 3, Marion and his 50-man mounted company attacked the Loyalist forces near the Little Pee Dee River, routing their 45-man advance guard. The next day at dawn, Marion’s men charged the Loyalist militia, drawing their 200 men into an ambush and dispersing them.

The British traveled across South Carolina, plundering and destroying Revolutionary properties. This prompted Marion to move into South Carolina, where Revolutionaries angered by the British action signed up in large numbers. Marion was alerted to the presence of Loyalists at Shepherd's Ferry, on the south side of Black Mingo Creek, then 15 miles (24 km) away. While the reports indicated that the Loyalist numbers were larger than his own, the enthusiasm of his men prompted him to agree to an attack.

== Battle ==
Marion had wanted to surprise the Loyalists with an early morning attack. The surprise was spoiled when, at nearly midnight, the lead horses in his column began crossing Black Mingo Creek via the wooden plank bridge 1 mile (1.6 km) downstream from the Loyalist Camp alerting camp sentinels. Alarm shots were heard in the Loyalist camp and British Colonel John Coming Ball mobilized his forces to repulse the rebel attatck.

Marion divided his small force into three groups sending them down the main road, and off to the right and left, surrounding the Loyalist troops. Ball formed up his men in a moonlit field adjacent to Dollard's Tavern, and ordered them to hold their fire until rebel fighters were within 30 yards (27 meters). The Loyalists, although greater in number, found themselves between two firing lines, gave way after just a few rounds and retreated into the swamp.

Although less than 100 men were engaged in the actual fighting that lasted maybe 15 minutes, Marion lost two men, including Capt. George Logan, and 8 wounded. The Loyalists lost three and 13 mortally wounded or captured.

Marion confiscated Colonel Ball’s sorrel gelding as a personal prize, and rode the equine to the end of the war, after naming it “Ball.”

== Aftermath ==
Word of Marion's success spread, and he continued to recruit well after the battle. He also learned a lesson: he reportedly never again crossed a bridge intending surprise without first laying blankets down on it. On applying blankets to muffle bridge crossings, historian Alan Pell Crawford observed: "This was an admirable goal, but a problem in so far as Marion’s men often had no blankets at all, much less enough to share with a bridge."

After Marion’s success at Black Mingo Creek, British and Loyalist forces began vigorously pursuing Marion, destroying his plantation at Pond’s Bluff and the properties of some of his men. Shortly afterward, Marion and his militia established an armed sanctuary at Snows Island.

== See also ==
- Henry Mouzon
- Francis Marion

== Notes and references ==
=== Sources ===
- Crawford, Alan Pell. 2024. This Fierce People: The Untold Story of America’s Revolutionary War in the South. Alfred A. Knopf, New York. ISBN 978-0-593-31850-8
- Moore, Horatio Newton (1845). The life and times of Gen. Francis Marion. J. B. Perry.
