= Albert H. Olpin =

Mormon missionary (1870–1923)

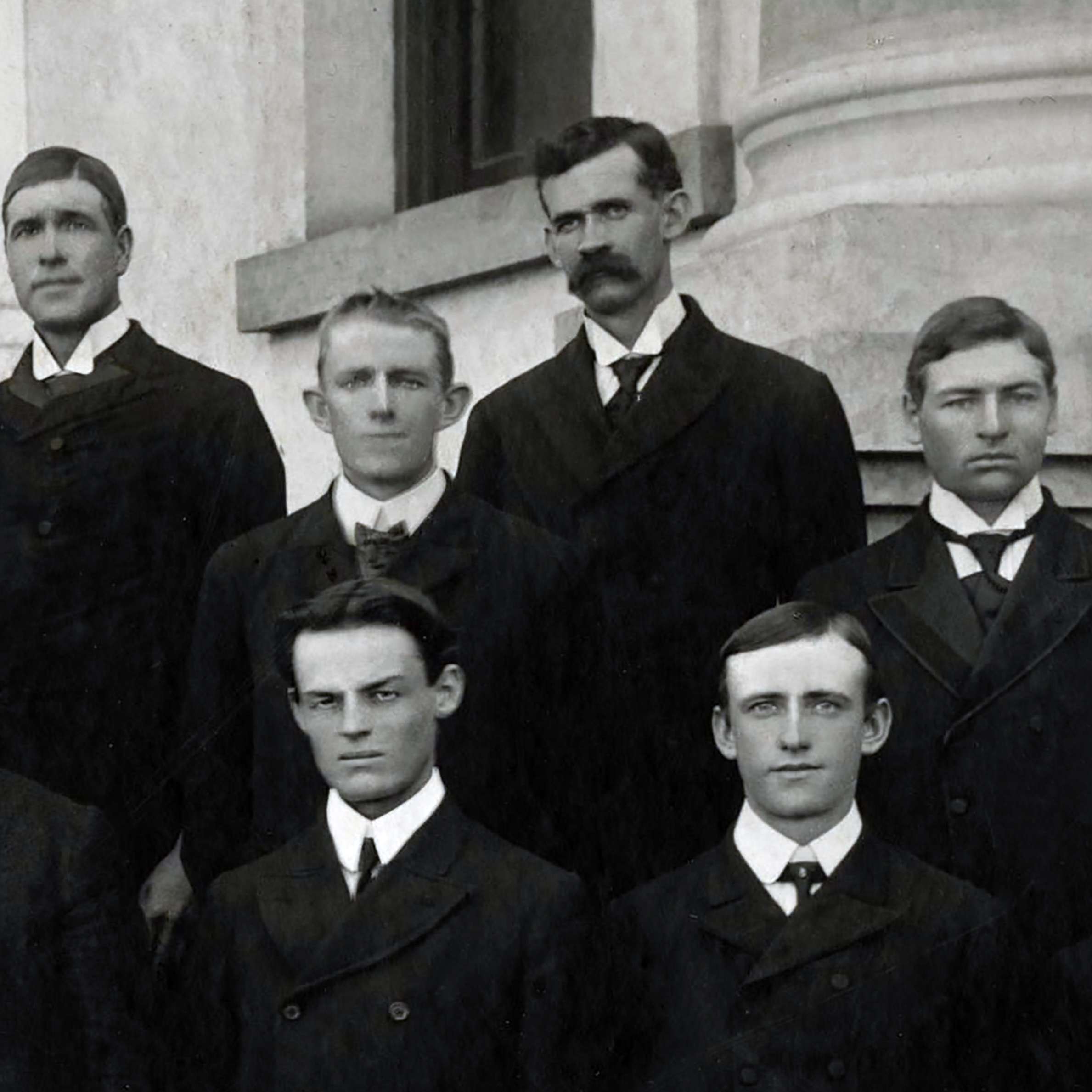
Albert H. Olpin (moustache) and other Mormon missionaries in South Carolina, November 15, 1902

Albert Henry Olpin (August 11, 1870 – August 13, 1923), a native of Pleasant Grove, Utah, was a Mormon missionary who was brutally attacked by a group of unidentified men in Williamsburg County, South Carolina in 1903. It is remembered as one of the worst incidents of anti-LDS violence to occur in the U.S. South.

== Attack and recovery ==
According to a contemporary news account, Elder A. Olpin "had been so severely tortured by a mob that he had become a raving maniac. The dispatch stated that Olpin had been sent to an asylum and was put In a straightjacket. According to a second dispatch Elder Olpin was trying to convert a farmer's family in Williamsburg County, South Carolina. He was ordered to leave, but refused. During the night a mob surrounded his home, and after beating him with clubs and switches dragged him through a creek. Later Olpin escaped from the mob and dogs were put on his trail. This caused the fright which made the Elder lose his mind." A newsmagazine of the Church of Jesus Christ of Latter-Day Saints, the Millennial Star, reported, "...another Elder laboring in the Southern States has been mobbed and most seriously injured...From the meager dispatches it is learned that Elder Olpin was so badly beaten that he lost his reason and had to be cared for in an asylum...Elder Olpin is thirty-two years old and has labored in the South sixteen months. He is not one who would seek trouble but is unassuming and mild."

A narrative account by Olpin's daughter stated, "In April of 1903 he was traveling with a new companion a young man by the name of Elder Burtosh. His diary states that this was his first new elder to break in. They were walking between two towns carrying their little suitcases that contained all their possessions. A negro came along driving a team of mules on a wagon. They set their baggage in his wagon. The negro whipped up his mules and the men (my father and his companion) were forced to run after him to reclaim their bags. This made them very hot and tired so they stopped at a house and knocked. A girl came to the door and they asked her for a drink of water. She disappeared, apparently going for the water. Instead she went to the back of the house and told some men that these Mormon Elders had insulted her. These men came running around the house with clothes paddles and revolvers and started chasing them. Elder Burtosh, who was a younger man, got away, but they chased my father through five miles of swamps beating him unmercifully with their paddles and butts of revolvers. His head was gashed and crushed. He was knocked senseless." Olpin was eventually delivered to the Lake City jail, and then to the South Carolina State Hospital for the Insane at Columbia but his traumatic head injuries were such that he remembered little of this period of time. When president of the LDS Southern States Mission, Ephraim Hesmer Nye, visited Olpin at the insane asylum in Columbia, South Carolina where he had been confined after the beating, Nye suffered a heart attack and died the following day.

Eventually his family sought assistance from President Joseph F. Smith to have Olpin brought back to Utah. Olpin was able to return to Pleasant Grove, arriving July 5, 1903, accompanied by Dr. J. L. Thompson of the South Carolina State Insane Hospital. The Millennial Star reported, "The officials have shown him every attention and think he will resume normal conditions after a little rest." The doctor who accompanied him told the family that Olpin's mood and outlook had improved upon seeing the Rocky Mountains.

== Later life and death ==
Olpin was married in 1895 and had seven children. He became a city councilman, carpenter, building contractor, and millman in Pleasant Grove. He had long struggled with intermittent major depression and died by self-inflicted gunshot wound in 1923. Olpin's son A. Ray Olpin was president of the University of Utah from 1946 to 1964.

== See also ==
- Suicide intervention
- Suicide prevention
- Kingstree jail fire
- Lynching of Frazier B. Baker and Julia Baker
