= District of Columbia Suffrage Act =

1867 U.S. federal law

- Other short titles: District of Columbia Franchise Bill
- Long title: An act to regulate the elective franchise in the District of Columbia
- Enacted by: the 39th United States Congress
- Effective: 1867-01-08

The District of Columbia Suffrage Act was an 1867 federal law that granted voting rights to all males over the age of 21 in the District of Columbia, United States. The franchise was withheld from "welfare or charity cases, those under guardianship, those convicted of major crimes and those who had voluntarily sheltered Confederate troops or spies during the Civil War", but there were no race-based restrictions, and thus it was the first law passed in the United States guaranteeing African Americans the right to vote in public elections.

== History ==
=== Timeline ===
- 1866-12-13 – Bill passed the Senate, 33-13
- 1866-12-14 – House passed the Senate version, 118-46
- 1867-01-05 – Johnson veto
- 1867-01-07 – Senate overrode veto, 29-10
- 1867-01-08 – Bill became law
- 1867-02-25 – First ballots cast by black men in an election held in Georgetown, District of Columbia

=== Politics and analysis ===
A correspondent for the Richmond Times-Dispatch, late of the Confederate States, was present for the passage of the bill in the House and while he himself was unhappy, he documented the elation inside the U.S. Capitol:

The galleries of the House of Representatives were crowded with Negroes...When the result of the voting was announced, the hall and galleries resounded with applause—the mingled applause of whites and blacks...They rushed from the galleries, shaking hands with each other, with members of Congress, indeed with anybody they saw...We do not blame the negroes for experiencing a feeling of exultation, and for being surprised into comical manifestations of spasmodic joy...Here is Sambo, within less than one year after he was a slave...[elevated] into a suffragan, and the political equal of educated whites!

U.S. President Andrew Johnson vetoed the bill on January 5, 1867, concluding his veto message, "To give [the ballot] indiscriminately to a new class, wholly unprepared by previous habits and opportunities to perform the trust which it demands, is to degrade it, and finally to destroy its power, for it may be safely assumed that no political truth is better established than that such indiscriminate and all-embracing extension of popular suffrage must end at last in its destruction." Johnson opposed the bill nominally on constitutional grounds but more genuinely on account of his forthright anti-black racism. According to historian Annette Gordon-Reed, "Johnson's cafeteria-style constitutionalism was transparently instrumental...The president [vetoed the bill] despite the fact that Article I, Section 8 of the Constitution that he claimed to so revere plainly gives Congress the power 'to exercise exclusive legislation in all cases whatsoever' in the District of Columbia. His opposition to this measure lays waste to the notion that concerns for the strict construction of the Constitution or his ideas about the metes and bounds of federalism were Johnson's chief motivator. It was never a matter of law and procedure with him when blacks were involved."

The bill was passed into law on January 8, 1867, over Johnson's veto. A related act allowing black men to vote in organized territories of the United States was passed two days later on January 10, 1867.

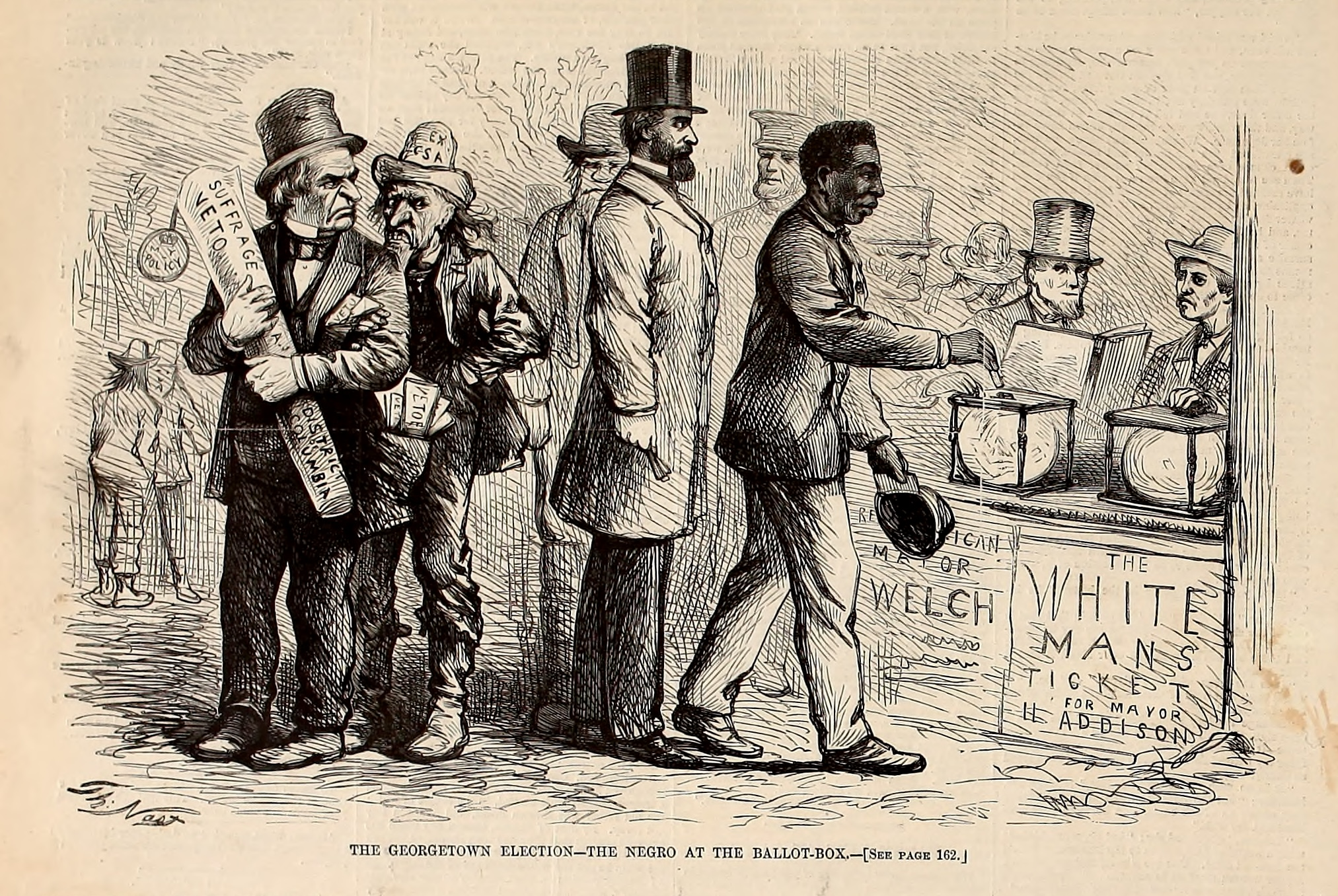
"The Georgetown Election – The Negro at the Ballot Box" (Thomas Nast, Harper's Weekly, March 16, 1867)

This law was part of the first major push of Congressional Reconstruction, in which the Radical Republicans took the initiative in reshaping the country in the wake of the American Civil War. According to historian Eric Foner, "...A month later, the city held an election and, for the first time in living memory, Democrats chose not to parade with banners 'in regard to niggers, miscegenation and similar matters.' Then, Congress extended manhood suffrage to the territories. Three points appeared 'fully settled' among Republican leaders, John Pool reported from Washington: existing Southern governments should be superseded, 'rebels' should hold no place in the new regimes, and 'the negroes should vote.'" After the polls closed in Georgetown, the editorial department of Harper's Weekly opined, "As we said last week, slavery essentially injures the enslaved, although probably less than the enslaver; and it has long been plain to every observer that if the freedmen could not be safely trusted with the ballot the enslavers ought certainly to be disfranchised."

At a St. Louis political convention ahead of the voting on the bill, Francis Minor had asked that women be included in D.C. suffrage, but the request was ignored.

== See also ==
- Kingstree jail fire
- Reconstruction Amendments
- Voting rights in the United States
- Black suffrage in the United States
- Disfranchisement after the Reconstruction era
