= Marion Park =

Park in Washington, D.C., U.S.

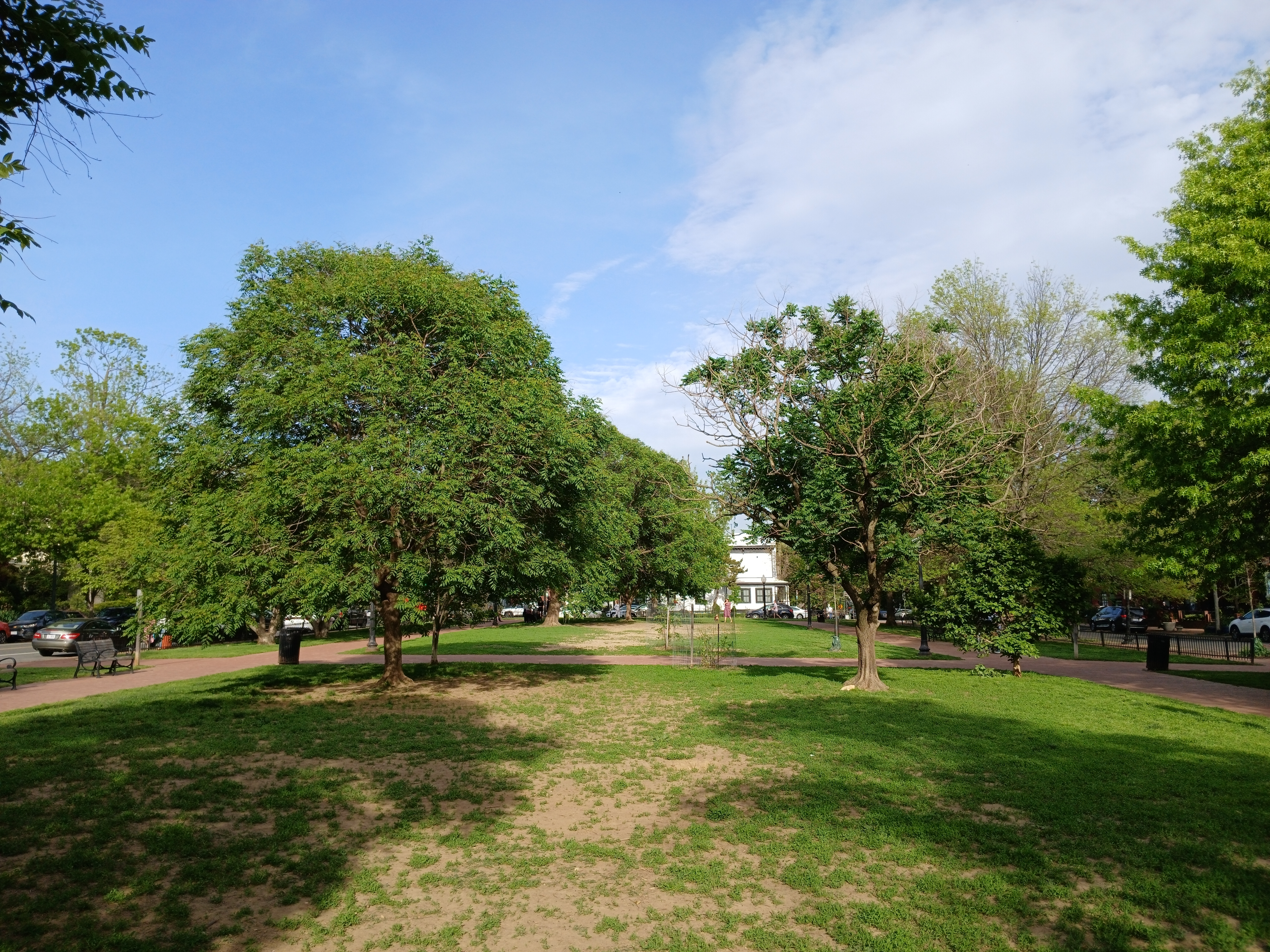
- East end of the park, April 2025

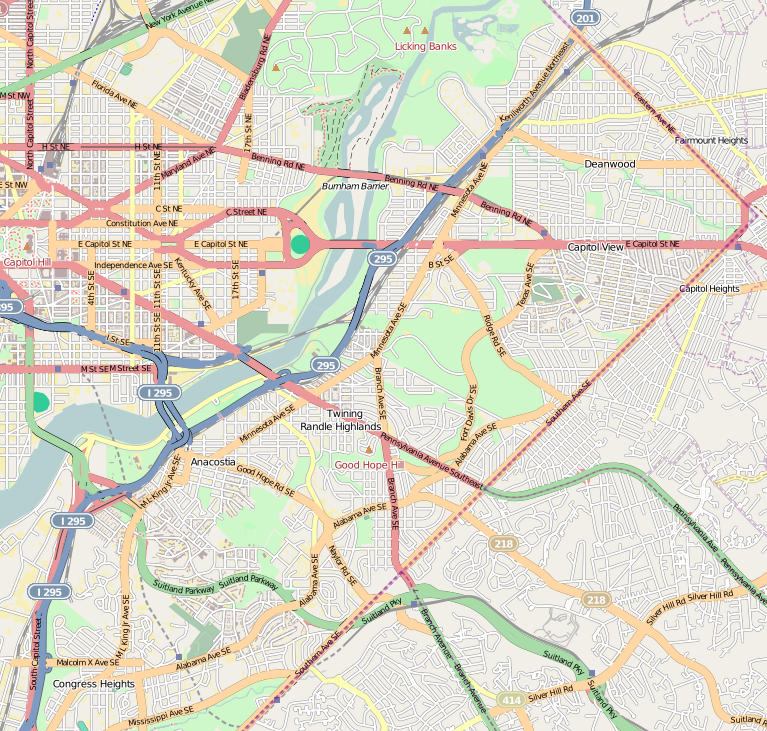
- Location within Washington, D.C.
- Location: Washington, D.C.
- Coordinates: 38°52′59″N 76°59′58″W
- Website: home.nps.gov/cahi/learn/historyculture/cahi_marion.htm

Marion Park is a public park named after Revolutionary War leader Francis Marion also known as The Swamp Fox. It is located at 4th Street, 6th Street, and E Street, Southeast, Washington, D.C., in the Capitol Hill neighborhood. Locally, it is known informally as Turtle Park because of the large concrete turtle in its playground.

== History ==
Marion Park was first established as open ground, dating back to the original plans for the city created by Pierre L'Enfant in 1791. Also included in updated plans from Andrew Ellicott, this reservation has served continuously as a park since its first improvements in 1885. It is one of the larger parks in the Capitol Hill area. In 1764 the tract of land was known as Houp's Addition, and was owned by Jonathan Slater. In 1791, Mr. Slater sold the tract to William Prout, who then had to turn over the land to the federal government soon after. Improvements were made by 1886 which gave the park an ornamental elegance in the developing neighborhood. A large vase in the center of the park was filled with tropical flowers every summer. This "Large Hilton Iron Vase" was used to direct the flow of traffic through the park through the carriage paths. In 1963, the vase was removed, and the traffic patterns were redirected outside of the boundaries of Marion Park.

A statue to Francis Marion was authorized on May 8, 2008. However it was met with opposition by some local residents. It was argued that they were not consulted by the federal government on the placement of the statue in a DC park. In addition the figure of Francis Marion is controversial as he fought Native Americans and was a slave owner.

== Uses ==
The park has a playground, and is a popular place to bring dogs.
