= Alan Pell Crawford =

American author and journalist

Alan Pell Crawford (born 1953) is an American author and journalist who has written popular histories of the United States during the 18th and 19th century.

== Career ==
Crawford became a political analyst speechwriter at the U.S. Senate then a public speaker, and has written numerous articles, essays and reviews.Crawford has been a resident scholar at George Washington’s Mount Vernon, at the International Center for Jefferson Studies at Monticello and at the Boston Athenaeum.Crawford came to national attention in 1977, with an article in The Nation, entitled "Richard Viguerie’s Bid for Power," later expanded in the book Thunder on the Right: The ‘New Right’ and the Politics of Resentment, published in 1980.

Subsequent books are Unwise Passions: The True Story of a Remarkable Woman and the First Great Scandal of Eighteenth-Century America, about Ann Cary Randolph Morris, and Twilight at Monticello, about the debt-ridden retirement of Thomas Jefferson.

== Works ==
- Crawford, A. (1980). Thunder on the Right: The "new Right" and the Politics of Resentment. Pantheon Books. ISBN 978-0-394-74862-7.
- Crawford, A.P. (2000). Unwise Passions: A True Story of a Remarkable Woman--and the First Great Scandal of Eighteenth-century America. Simon & Schuster. ISBN 978-0-684-83474-0.
- Crawford, A.P. (2009). Twilight at Monticello: The Final Years of Thomas Jefferson. Random House Publishing Group. ISBN 978-0-8129-6946-7.
- Crawford, A.P. (2017). How Not to Get Rich: The Financial Misadventures of Mark Twain. Houghton Mifflin Harcourt. ISBN 978-0-544-83671-6.
- Crawford, Alan Pell (2024-07-02). This Fierce People. New York: Knopf. ISBN 978-0-593-31850-8.
