= Kingstree Star =

South Carolina newspaper (1855–~1878)

The Kingstree Star was a weekly newspaper published in South Carolina's Williamsburg District (Williamsburg County after 1868) from 1855 until approximately 1878, with stops and starts in between, for the American Civil War (publication was suspended from 1861 until 1866) and due to financial challenges. About a dozen individual issues survive in American newspaper archives.

== Description ==
The Kingstree Star was a 23-inch by 32-inch, four-page newspaper published on Wednesdays, with a circulation of between 300 and 650 subscribers. In 1916 an old copy of the Kingstree Star from 1872 was described as having typography that compared favorably to other papers of its time, and having "a great scarcity of local advertisements," with Charleston merchants heavily represented instead. In 1872 an annual subscription cost US$3 (equivalent to $78.74 in 2024). The newspaper's motto was Be steady in a noble end, and show mankind that Truth has still a friend.

== History ==
The Kingstree Star was the first newspaper published in the Williamsburg District. The Star was founded in 1855 by partners Gilbert & Darr using a printing press from the Sumter Banner, which had been folded into the Sumter Watchman. The press and other surplus materials from the Banner were hauled the 40 mi (64 km) from Sumter to Kingstree by wagon since there were not yet any connecting rail lines. The paper was then sold and resold, and in 1856 was acquired by Richard Columbus "Lum" Logan. Logan served as editor, with his brothers Texas Logan and Calhoun Logan "as the printing force." Publication was suspended in January 1861 due to forthcoming unpleasantness: The Charleston Daily Courier reported, "Our spirited contemporary the Kingstree Star of Williamsburg is under temporary suspension—occultation by Mars—editors, foreman and compositors are all in arms and now near this city. Our exchanges and readers interested, will accept this explanation for an interruption, which we trust will be short." Publication of the Kingstree Star resumed in spring 1866.

In 1868, ex-South Carolina governor Benjamin Franklin Perry commended the Kingstree Star for being the only paper in the state bold enough to endorse his editorials opposing the Reconstruction Acts. In January 1868, publication of the Kingstree Star was suspended. Publication must have resumed because it was again suspended in July 1874. Samuel W. Maurice, an attorney and Confederate veteran, purchased the Kingstree Star in October 1874. Maurice was shortly "forced to give it up...on account of his health." Maurice's association with the Kingstree Star ended in 1878. In 1878 it was reportedly to be revived by "Mr. James S. Heyward, editor and proprietor of the Orangeburg Taxpayer. The Star will be edited by D. B. Gilland, a young lawyer of Kingstree." Heywerd was the editor of the Kingstree Star and Eagle at the time of his 1879 testimony before the U.S. Senate about Stephen A. Swails and the racial/political climate of the county. The paper changed hands several times after that, and was published intermittently; successors were entitled The Williamsburg Herald, and The Star and Herald.

Editorials written by Logan in 1871 during the Reconstruction Era were said to have "flayed" state legislators. An 1876 report in an Ohio paper on South Carolina politics called the Star one of the "bitterest sheets in the state." Another account described it as having been known as a "staunch Democratic newspaper."

In 1933, "Several ancient copies of the Kingstree papers were found recently by Mrs. Wilmot S. Gilland, who is a granddaughter of the Mr. Logan the editor." As of 2023, only 13 individual issues of the Kingstree Star are known to exist in holdings spread across four American libraries.

== Editor ==
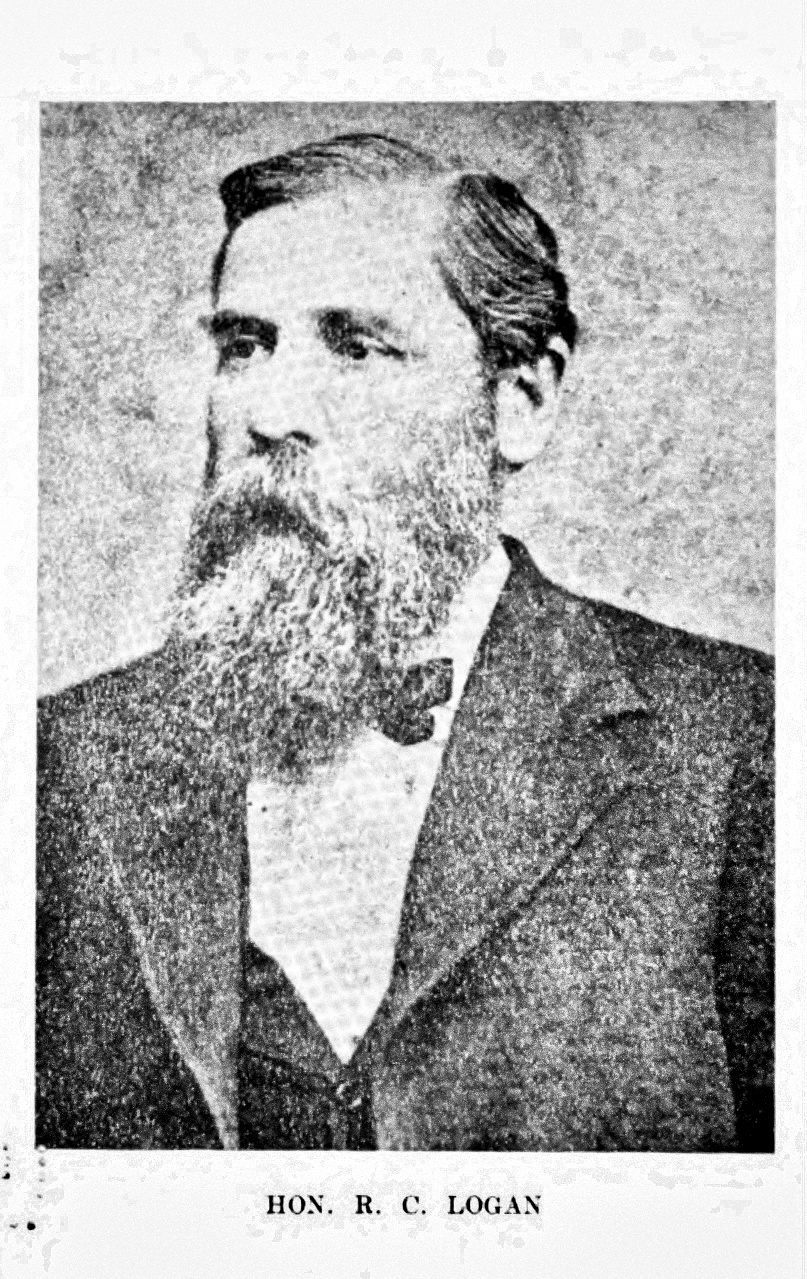
Richard Columbus Logan (1832–1904) of Williamsburg County, South Carolina

R. C. Logan (1832–1904) was the youngest signer of the South Carolina Declaration of Secession. He served as a first lieutenant with the Wee Nee Volunteers of the 1st (Hagood's) South Carolina Volunteers regiment of the Confederate States Army. In later life he was always known as Colonel Logan "gaining by courtesy his higher military title by reason of his high-toned chivalry and ideals of community service." A history of Williamsburg County published in 1923 states that, Logan edited the Star "for a number of years during the dark days of reconstruction...He was very active and powerful in fighting the carpetbagger administration in South Carolina, and was one in Williamsburg who never forgave the usurpers." In 1875 Logan was hired as editor of the Greenville Enterprise and Mountaineer of Greenville, South Carolina. He returned to Kingstree in 1885 as the founder of the Williamsburg County Record newspaper, which persisted as the major county newspaper for another 50 years.
