= Sumter News =

Newspaper in South Carolina

The Sumter News was a newspaper serving Sumter, South Carolina. It became the True Southron and eventually merged with The Watchman to form The Watchman and Southron.

== History ==
H. L. Darr was a journalist in Charleston, South Carolina, who moved to Sumter to establish a weekly paper. Noah Graham Osteen (born January 25, 1843) joined the paper soon after. Frank Moses worked for it. It competed against the Sumter Watchman.

A conservative paper, it promoted Democratic Party politics and described itself as a white man's paper with an editorial header stating "This is a white man's country and must be ruled by white men". Moses wrote columns and editorials calling for the development of industry in the South, criticizing "carpetbaggers", Northern missionaries helping establish Union Leagues, and Republican activities, especially Radical Republican, in Washington D.C.

The paper used the telegraph to get Associated Press stories on U.S. President Andrew Johnson's fight against the Fourteenth Amendment to the United States Constitution and impeachment. The paper was renamed the True Southron. It eventually merged with the Watchman to become the Watchman and Southron.

Osteen developed the business into a publishing company. His son Hubert established The Item in Sumter.
