= Francis Marion =

American military officer, planter and politician (1732–1795)

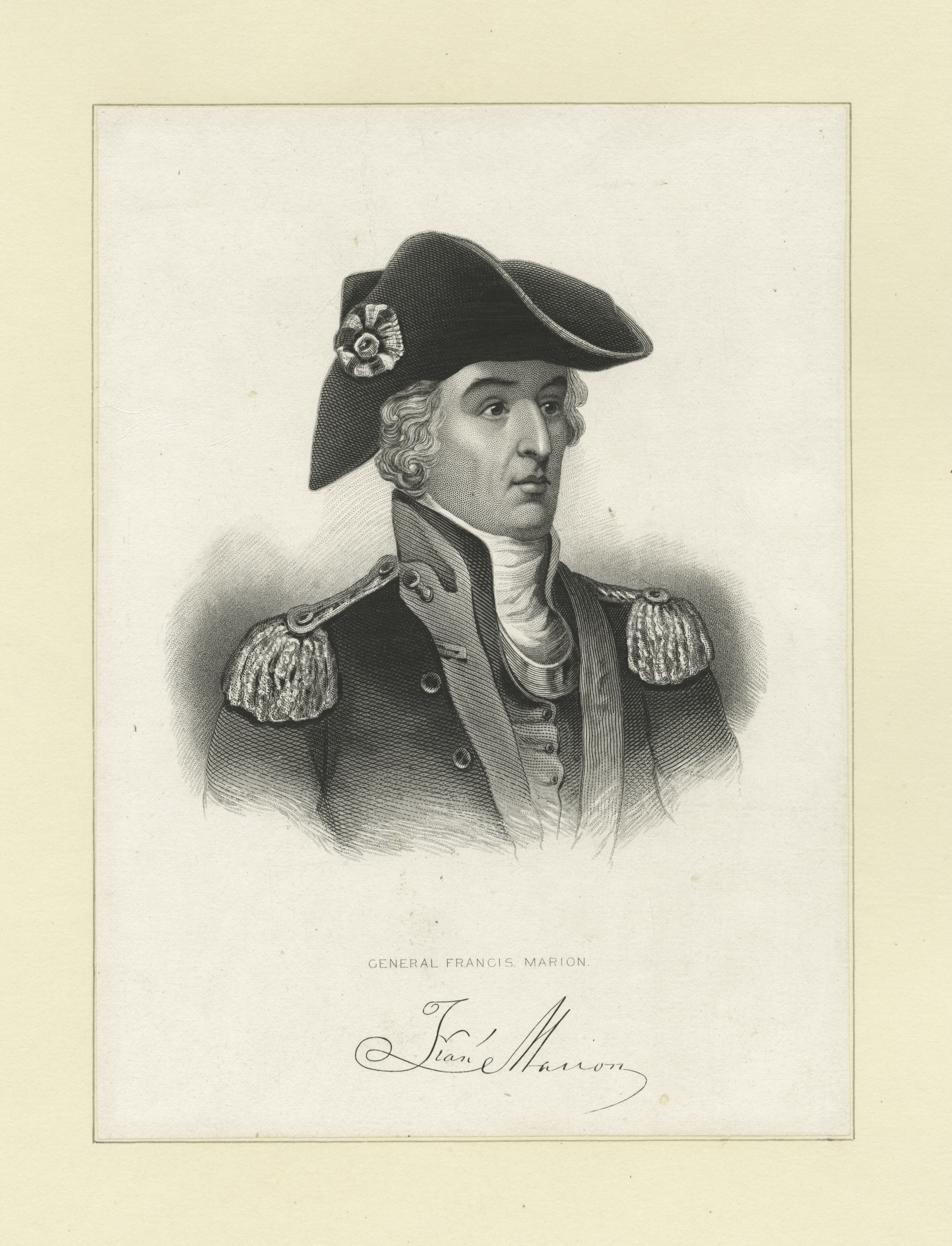
- Born: c. 1732; Berkeley County, South Carolina, British America
- Died: February 27, 1795 (aged c. 63); Berkeley County, South Carolina, U.S.
- Burial place: Pineville, South Carolina
- Spouse: Mary Esther Videau
- Military career
- Allegiance: Great Britain; United States
- Branch: South Carolina Militia; Continental Army
- Service years: 1757–1782
- Rank: Brevet Colonel (Continental Army); Brigadier General (South Carolina Militia)
- Nickname: The Swamp Fox
- Conflicts: French and Indian War; Anglo-Cherokee War; American Revolutionary War; Battle of Sullivan's Island; Siege of Savannah; Siege of Charleston; Battle of Black Mingo; Battle of Tearcoat Swamp; Siege of Fort Watson; Siege of Fort Motte; Battle of Eutaw Springs

Brigadier General Francis Marion (c. 1732 – February 27, 1795), also known as the "Swamp Fox", was an American military officer, planter, and politician who served during the French and Indian War and the Revolutionary War. During the American Revolution, Marion supported the Patriot cause and enlisted in the Continental Army, fighting against British forces in the southern theater of the American Revolutionary War from 1780 to 1781.

Though he never commanded a field army or served as a commander in a major engagement, Marion's use of irregular warfare against the British has led him to be considered one of the fathers of guerrilla and maneuver warfare, and his tactics form a part of the modern-day military doctrine of the U.S. Army's 75th Ranger Regiment.

== Early life ==
Francis Marion was born in Berkeley County, Province of South Carolina, around 1732. His father Gabriel Marion was a Huguenot who emigrated to the Thirteen Colonies from France at some point prior to 1700 due to the Edict of Fontainebleau and became a planter. Marion was born on his family's plantation, and at approximately the age of 15, he was hired on a merchant ship bound for the West Indies which sank on his first voyage; he and five other crew members escaped on a lifeboat but had to spend one week at sea before reaching land. In the following years, Marion managed the family's plantation, including overseeing the activities of the family's slaves.

== French and Indian War ==
Marion began his military career shortly before his 25th birthday. On January 1, 1757, Francis and his brother, Job, were recruited by Captain John Postell to serve in the South Carolina Militia during the French and Indian War. Marion also saw service during the Anglo-Cherokee War.

== American Revolutionary War ==
=== Early service ===
During the American Revolution, Marion supported the Patriot cause and on June 21, 1775, he was commissioned as an officer in the Continental Army's 2nd South Carolina Regiment (commanded by William Moultrie) at the rank of captain. Marion served with Moultrie in the defense of Fort Sullivan from a Royal Navy attack on June 28, 1776. In September 1776, the Continental Congress commissioned Marion as a lieutenant colonel. In the autumn of 1779, he took part in the siege of Savannah, a failed Franco-American attempt to capture the capital of Georgia which had been previously occupied by British forces.

=== Siege of Charleston ===
A British force led by Sir Henry Clinton entered South Carolina in the early spring of 1780 and laid siege to Charleston. Marion was not captured with the rest of the city's garrison when Charleston capitulated on May 12, 1780, as he had broken an ankle in an accident and had left the city to recuperate. Clinton led part of the force that had captured Charleston back to New York, but a significant number stayed for operations under Lord Charles Cornwallis in the Carolinas. After the loss of Charleston and the defeats suffered by Isaac Huger's men at the Battle of Monck's Corner and Abraham Buford's troops at the Battle of Waxhaws (near the North Carolina border, in what is now Lancaster County), Marion organized a small military unit, which at first consisted of between 20 and 70 men and was the only force then opposing the British in the region. At this point, Marion was still hobbling on his slowly healing ankle.

=== Guerrilla campaigns ===
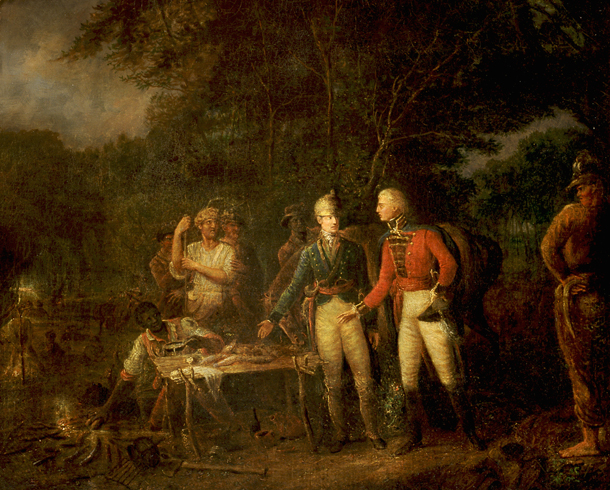
General Marion Inviting a British Officer to Share His Meal by John Blake White; his slave Oscar Marion kneels at the left of the group.

Marion joined Major General Horatio Gates on July 27 just before the Battle of Camden, but Gates had formed a low opinion of Marion. Gates sent Marion towards the interior to gather intelligence on the British forces opposing them. He thus missed the battle, which resulted in a British victory. Marion showed himself to be a singularly able leader of irregular militiamen and ruthless in his terrorizing of Loyalists. Unlike the Continental Army, Marion's Men, as they were known, served without pay, supplied their own horses, arms and often their food. Marion's Men operated from a base camp on Snow's Island in Florence County.

Marion rarely committed his men to frontal warfare but repeatedly attacked larger bodies of Loyalists or British regulars with quick surprise attacks and equally sudden withdrawal from the field. After their capture of Charleston, the British garrisoned South Carolina with help from local Loyalists, except for Williamsburg, which they were never able to hold. The British made one attempt to garrison Williamsburg at the colonial village of Hilltown but were driven out by Marion at the Battle of Black Mingo.

A state-erected information sign at Marion's gravesite on the former Belle Isle Plantation shows that he was engaged in twelve major battles and skirmishes in a two-year period: Black Mingo Creek on September 28, 1780; Tearcoat Swamp on October 25, 1780; Georgetown (four attacks) between October 1780 and May 1781; Fort Watson on April 23, 1781; Fort Motte on May 12, 1781; Quinby Bridge on July 17, 1781; Parker's Ferry on August 13, 1781; Eutaw Springs on September 8, 1781; and Wadboo Plantation on August 29, 1782. Cornwallis observed, "Colonel Marion had so wrought the minds of the people, partly by the terror of his threats and cruelty of his punishments, and partly by the promise of plunder, that there was scarcely an inhabitant between the Santee and the Pee Dee that was not in arms against us."

=== Engagements with Tarleton ===
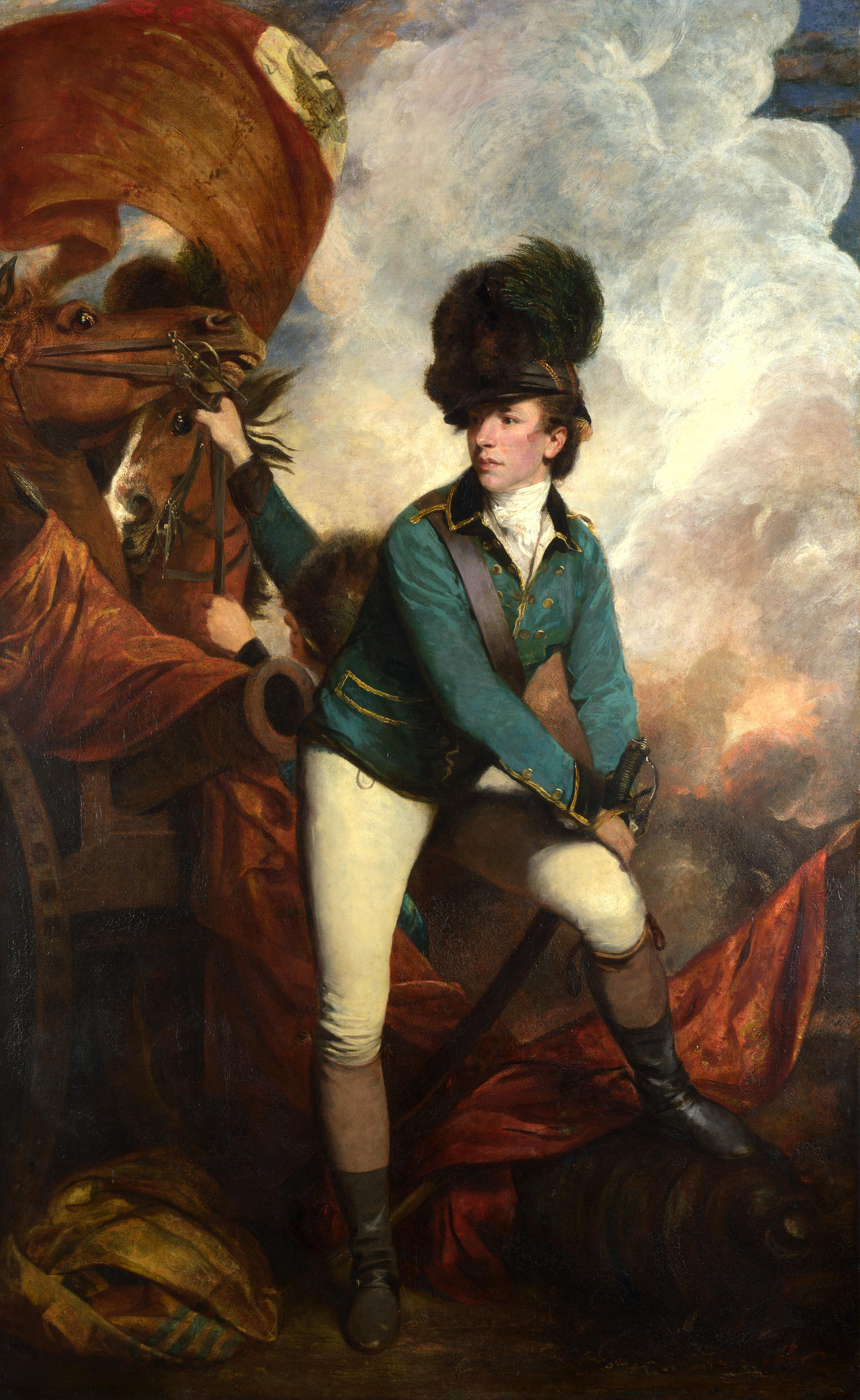
Portrait of Banastre Tarleton by Joshua Reynolds, 1782

The British made repeated efforts to neutralize Marion's force, but Marion's intelligence gathering was excellent and that of the British was poor, due to the overwhelming Patriot presence in the Williamsburg area. Colonel Banastre Tarleton was sent to capture or kill Marion in November 1780. After pursuing Marion's troops for over 26 miles through a swamp, Tarleton supposedly said "as for this old fox, the Devil himself could not catch him." Based on this tale, Marion's supporters began to call him "the Swamp Fox".

Once Marion had shown his ability at guerrilla warfare, making himself a serious nuisance to the British, Governor John Rutledge commissioned him as a brigadier general of militia. Marion fought against freed enslaved people working or fighting alongside the British. He received an order from Rutledge to execute all Black people suspected of carrying provisions or gathering intelligence for the British "agreeable to the laws of this State."

=== End of the war ===
When Major General Nathanael Greene took command in the South, Marion and Lieutenant Colonel Henry Lee III were ordered in January 1781 to attack Georgetown, but were unsuccessful. In April, they took Fort Watson. In May, they captured Fort Motte, breaking communications between British outposts in the Carolinas. On August 31, Marion rescued a small American force trapped by 500 British soldiers, under the leadership of Major C. Fraser. For this action he received the thanks of the Continental Congress. Marion commanded the right wing under General Greene at the Battle of Eutaw Springs.

In January 1782, he was elected to the South Carolina General Assembly at Jacksonborough and left his troops to take up his seat. During his absence, Marion's men grew disheartened, particularly after a British sortie from Charleston, and there was reportedly a conspiracy to turn him over to the British. But in June of that year, he put down a Loyalist rebellion on the banks of the Pee Dee River. In August, Marion left his unit and returned to his slave plantation, Pond Bluff. In 1782, the British Parliament suspended offensive operations in America, and in December 1782, the British withdrew their garrison from Charleston. The Treaty of Paris brought the war to an end.

== Later life and death ==
When Marion returned to Pond Bluff, he discovered it had been destroyed during the war. Of the roughly 200 slaves there before the war, most had fled the plantation, with some joining the British when Clinton had issued the Philipsburg Proclamation offering freedom for people enslaved by Patriots. Those who had joined the British were evacuated from Charleston at the end of the war and at least one settled in Nova Scotia. Meanwhile, 10 people were moved to Belle Isle, a plantation owned by Marion's brother, Gabriel, during the war. Four house slaves were also moved to Gabriel's plantation, all of whom had been singled out for favorable treatment in Marion's prewar will: overseer June and his wife, Chloe; their daughter Phoebe (sister of Buddy, Marion's enslaved manservant); and her daughter Peggy.

These enslaved people, together with the 10 field hands, went back with him to Pond Bluff. After the war, Marion borrowed money to purchase more slaves for his plantation. At the age of 54, Marion married his 49-year-old cousin, Mary Esther Videau. During this period, he served several terms in the South Carolina State Senate.

On September 30, 1783 (approximately ten months after the final demobilization of Marion's militia), the Continental Congress resolved "that the Secretary at War issue to all officers in the army, under the rank of major general, who hold the same rank now that they held in the year 1777, a brevet commission one grade higher than their present rank, having respect to their seniority" on September 30, 1783; thereafter (amid the broader cease-fire that took effect in April 1783 alongside the signing of the Treaty of Paris by American signatories on September 3, 1783), Marion — who retained his September 1776-conferred Continental Army lieutenant colonelcy throughout his militia service — held the nominal rank of brevet colonel in the force until its official demobilization in tandem with the establishment of the United States Army in June 1784, although there is no record of him undertaking any duties in this functionally honorary capacity due to the effective cessation of hostilities.

In further recognition of his services, he was made commander of Fort Johnson, a sinecure with an annual salary of $500, in March 1784 (at the time, privates in the First American Regiment were paid $6.67 a month). He died on his plantation in 1795, at the age of 63, and was buried at Belle Isle Plantation Cemetery in Berkeley County, South Carolina.

== Legacy ==
The public memory of Marion has been shaped in large part by the first biography about him, The Life of General Francis Marion, written by Mason Locke Weems and based on the memoirs of South Carolinian soldier Peter Horry. The New York Times has described Weems as one of the "early hagiographers" of American literature "who elevated the Swamp Fox, Francis Marion, into the American pantheon." Weems is known for having invented the apocryphal "cherry tree" anecdote about George Washington, and "Marion's life received similar embellishment", as Amy Crawford wrote in Smithsonian magazine in 2007. In the 1835 novel Horse-Shoe Robinson by John P. Kennedy, a historical romance set against the background of the Southern theater of the American Revolutionary War, Marion appears and interacts with the fictional characters. In the book, he is depicted as decisive, enterprising, and valiant.

Hans Conried portrayed Marion in an episode of the Cavalcade of America television series, "The Swamp Fox", which was broadcast on October 25, 1955. Walt Disney Productions produced The Swamp Fox, an eight-episode mini-series about Marion that aired from 1959 to 1961. It starred Leslie Nielsen as Marion, and Nielsen was also one of the singers of the theme song.

Marion was one of the influences for the main character of Benjamin Martin (Mel Gibson) in the 2000 movie The Patriot, which, according to Crawford, "exaggerated the Swamp Fox legend for a whole new generation." The contrast between the film's depiction of Marion "as a family man and hero who single-handedly defeats countless hostile Brits" and the real-life Marion was one of the "egregious oversights" that Time magazine cited when listing The Patriot as number one of its "Top 10 historically misleading films" in 2011. In the film, Martin describes violence that he committed in the French and Indian War. Around the time of the film's release, comments in the British press challenged the American notion of Marion as a hero. In the Evening Standard, the British author Neil Norman called him "a thoroughly unpleasant dude who was, basically, a terrorist."

Concurrently, the British historian Christopher Hibbert described Marion as "very active in the persecution of the Cherokee Indians and not at all the sort of chap who should be celebrated as a hero. The truth is that people like Marion committed atrocities as bad, if not worse, than those perpetrated by the British." The English historian Hugh Bicheno compared Marion's behavior with British officers who also served in the Southern Colonies during the war, including Tarleton and James Wemyss. Referring to Marion, Tarleton, and Wemyss, Bicheno wrote that "they all tortured prisoners, hanged fence-sitters, abused parole and flags of truce, and shot their own men when they failed to live up to the harsh standards they set." According to Crawford, the biographies by historians William Gilmore Simms (The Life of Francis Marion) and Hugh Rankin can be regarded as generally accurate. The introduction to the 2007 edition of Simms's book (originally published in 1844) was written by Sean Busick, a professor of American history at Athens State University in Alabama, who says that based on the facts, "Marion deserves to be remembered as one of the heroes of the War for Independence." Crawford commented:

Francis Marion was a man of his times: he owned slaves, and he fought in a brutal campaign against the Cherokee Indians. While not noble by today's standards, Marion's experience in the French and Indian War prepared him for more admirable service.

== Landmarks ==
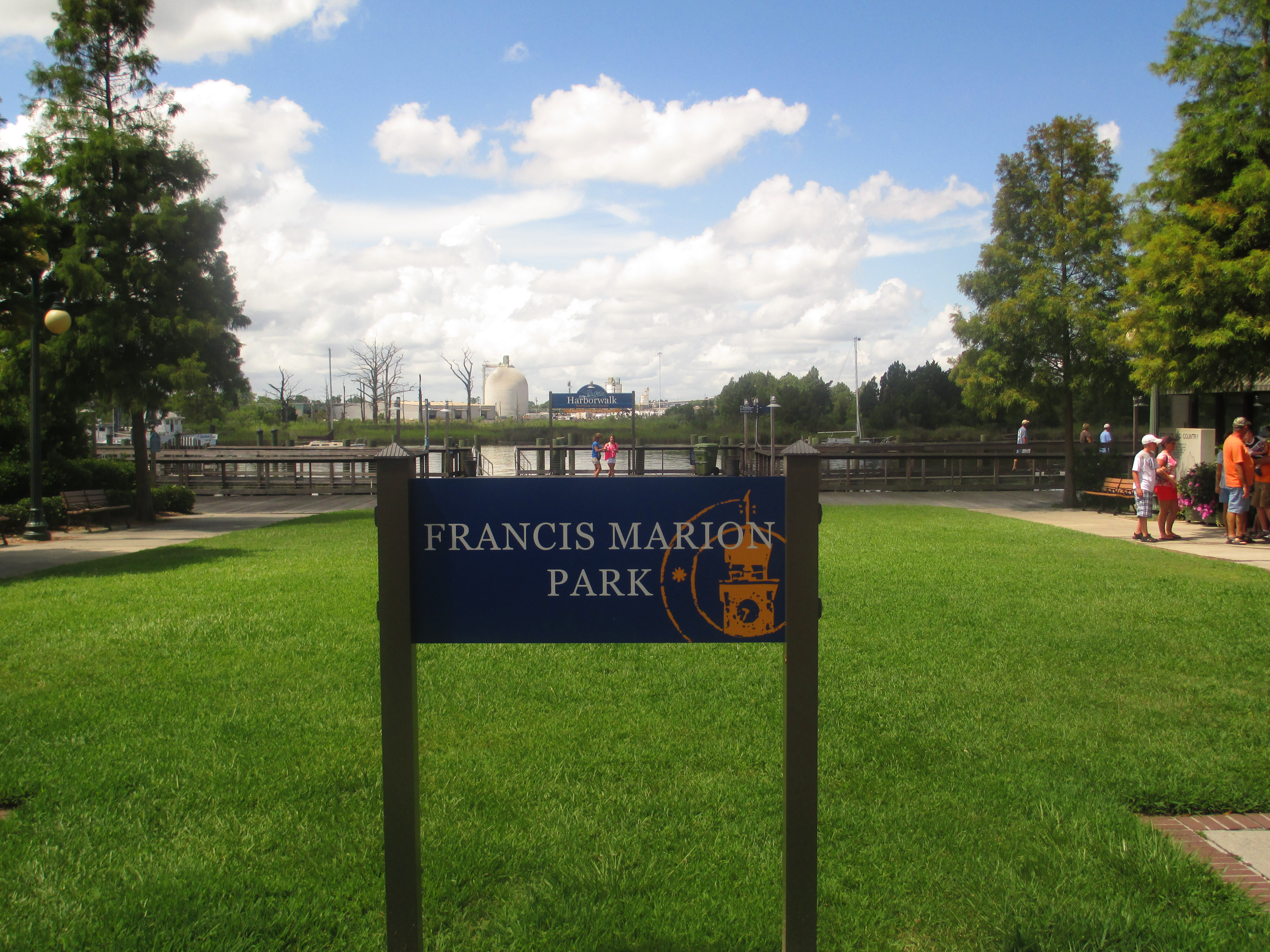
The Francis Marion Park is located in front of the Harborwalk in Georgetown, South Carolina.

Numerous locations in the U.S. are named after Francis Marion, including the Francis Marion National Forest near Charleston, South Carolina. The city of Marion, Iowa holds an annual Swamp Fox Festival. Marion County, South Carolina, and its county seat, the City of Marion, are named for Marion. The city features a statue of General Marion in the town square, and has a museum which includes many artifacts related to Francis Marion; the Marion High School mascot is the Swamp Fox. Francis Marion University is located nearby in Florence County, South Carolina. The Swamp Fox is a wooden roller coaster located in Myrtle Beach, South Carolina. In Washington, D.C., Marion Park is one of the four large parks in the Capitol Hill Parks constellation. The park is bounded by 4th & 6th Streets and at the intersection of E Street and South Carolina Avenue in southeast Washington, D.C.

The Francis Marion Hotel is a historic hotel in downtown Charleston, South Carolina. Within the hotel is a restaurant called the Swamp Fox. The municipalities of Marion in Alabama, Illinois, Indiana, Iowa, Kansas, Kentucky, Louisiana, Massachusetts, Mississippi, New York, North Carolina, Ohio, Pennsylvania, South Carolina, Virginia, and Marion Center, Pennsylvania, are named for Francis Marion. Marion County, Indiana (of which the city of Indianapolis is a part), is named for the general, as are Marion Counties in Alabama, Arkansas, Florida, Georgia, Iowa, Illinois, Kansas, Kentucky, Missouri, Mississippi, Ohio, Oregon, South Carolina, Tennessee, Texas, and West Virginia, and more than 30 townships in nine states. The Military Junior College Marion Military Institute in Marion, Alabama, has an organization called Swamp Fox which is attributed to Francis Marion. The marionberry is named after the county in Oregon and so derives its name from him.

The 169th Fighter Wing of the South Carolina Air National Guard, located about 12 miles east of Columbia in Eastover, South Carolina, boasts the title "Home of the Swamp Fox" and has an image of the face of a fox painted on the body of their F-16 Fighter Jets. The South Carolina State Guard, the successor to the South Carolina Militia, charters the Swamp Fox Explorer Post 1670 through the national division of Exploring (Learning for Life) for youth 14 to 20 years of age. In 1994, Marion was posthumously inducted into the U.S. Army Ranger Hall of Fame.

In 2006, the United States House of Representatives approved a monument to Francis Marion, to be built in Washington, D.C., sometime in 2007–2008. The bill died in the Senate and was reintroduced in January 2007. The Brigadier General Francis Marion Memorial Act of 2007 passed the House of Representatives in March 2007, and the Senate in April 2008. The bill was packaged into the omnibus Consolidated Natural Resources Act of 2008, which passed both houses and was enacted in May 2008. Although a site at Marion Park was selected, it was not built before authorization expired in 2018. Some local residents opposed a monument to a slaveowner. The U.S. Navy was home to the USS Francis Marion, a Paul Revere-class attack transport. The ship served as the flag for COMPHIBGRU 2 (Commander Amphibious Group 2). For many years, Submarine Squadron Four at the Charleston Naval Base called itself the Swamp Fox Squadron.

== Gallery ==
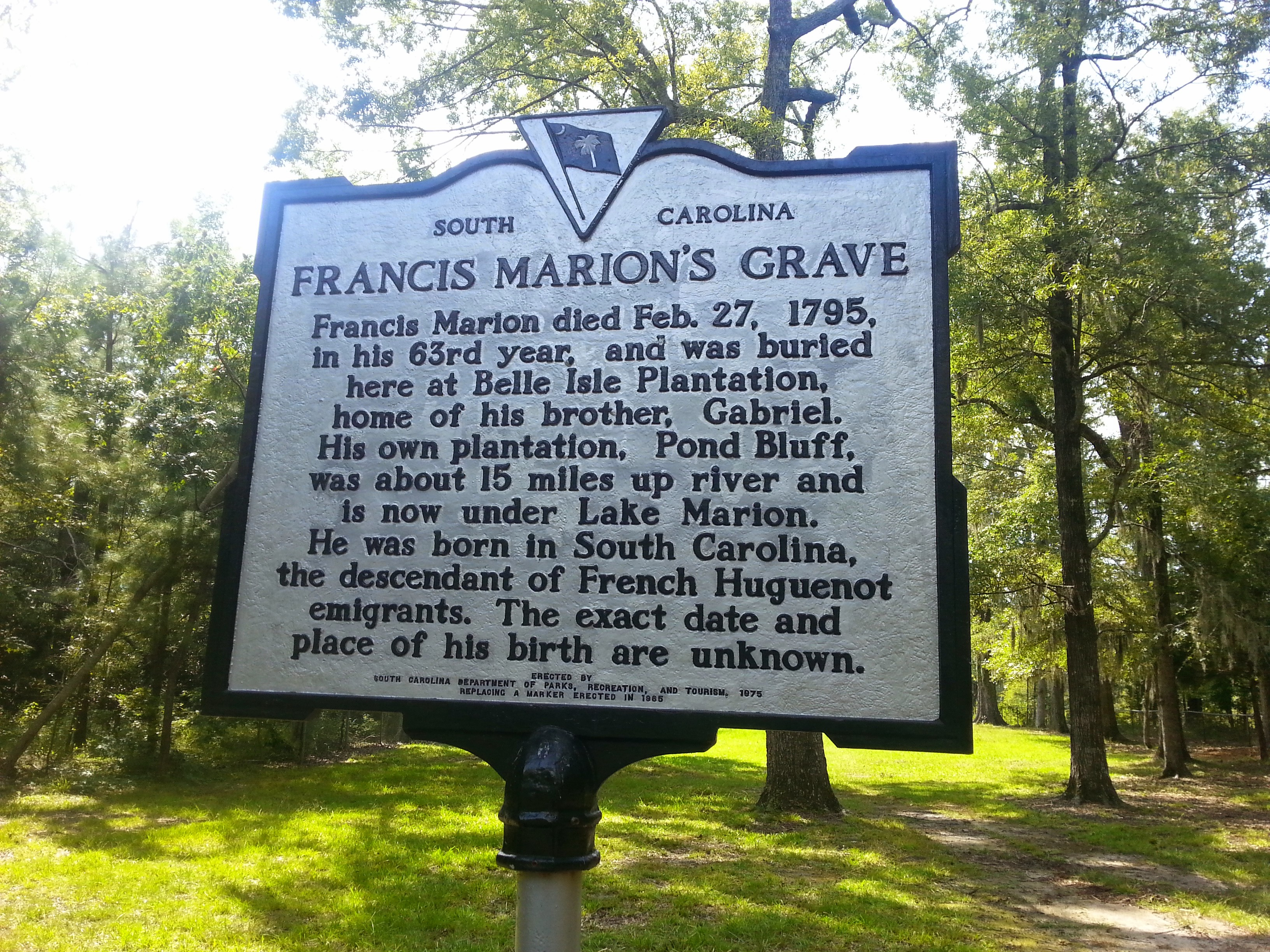
Historic marker at the burial site of Marion

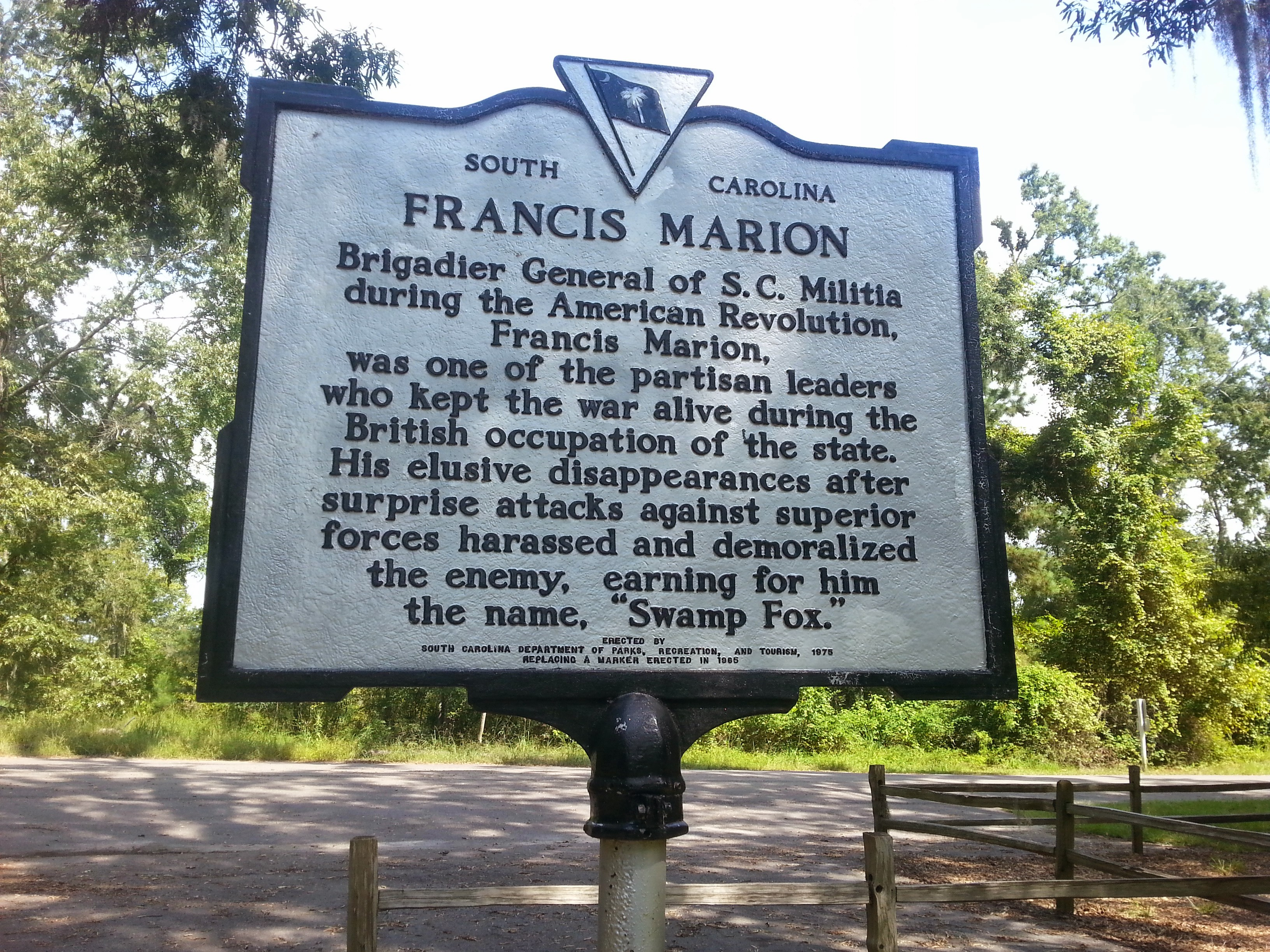
Historic marker at the burial site of Marion

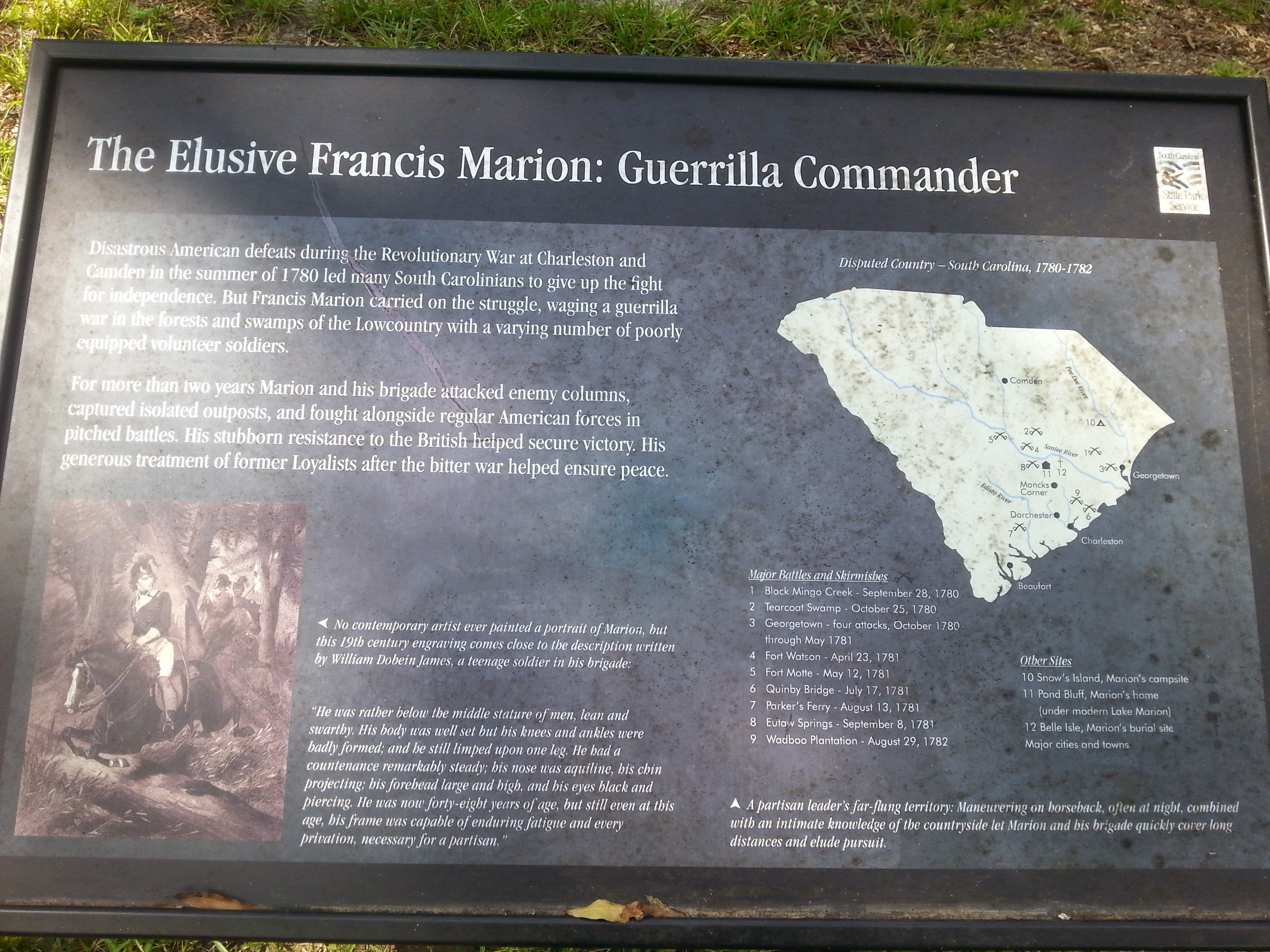
Informative sign at the burial site of Marion

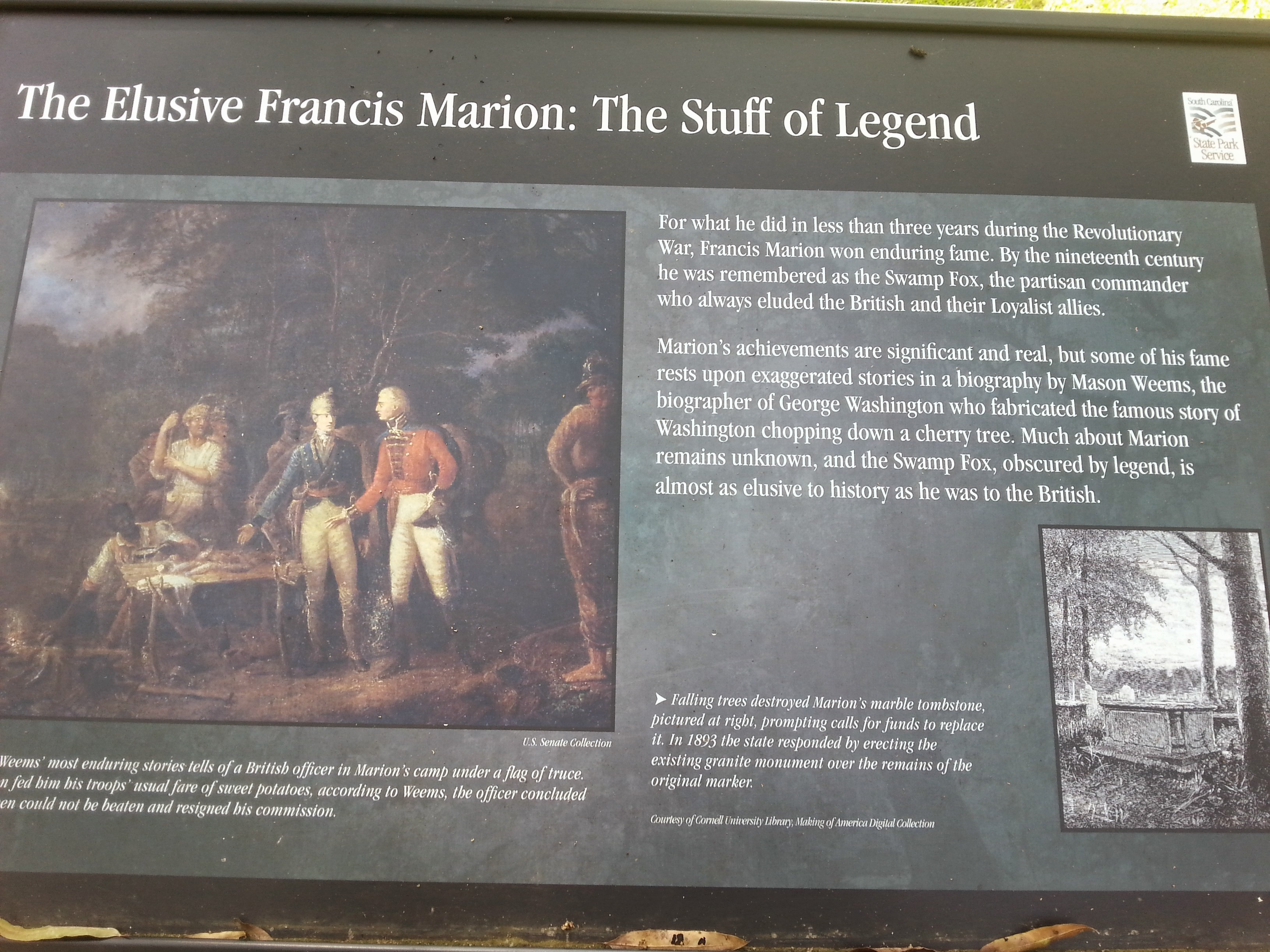
Informative sign at the burial site of Marion

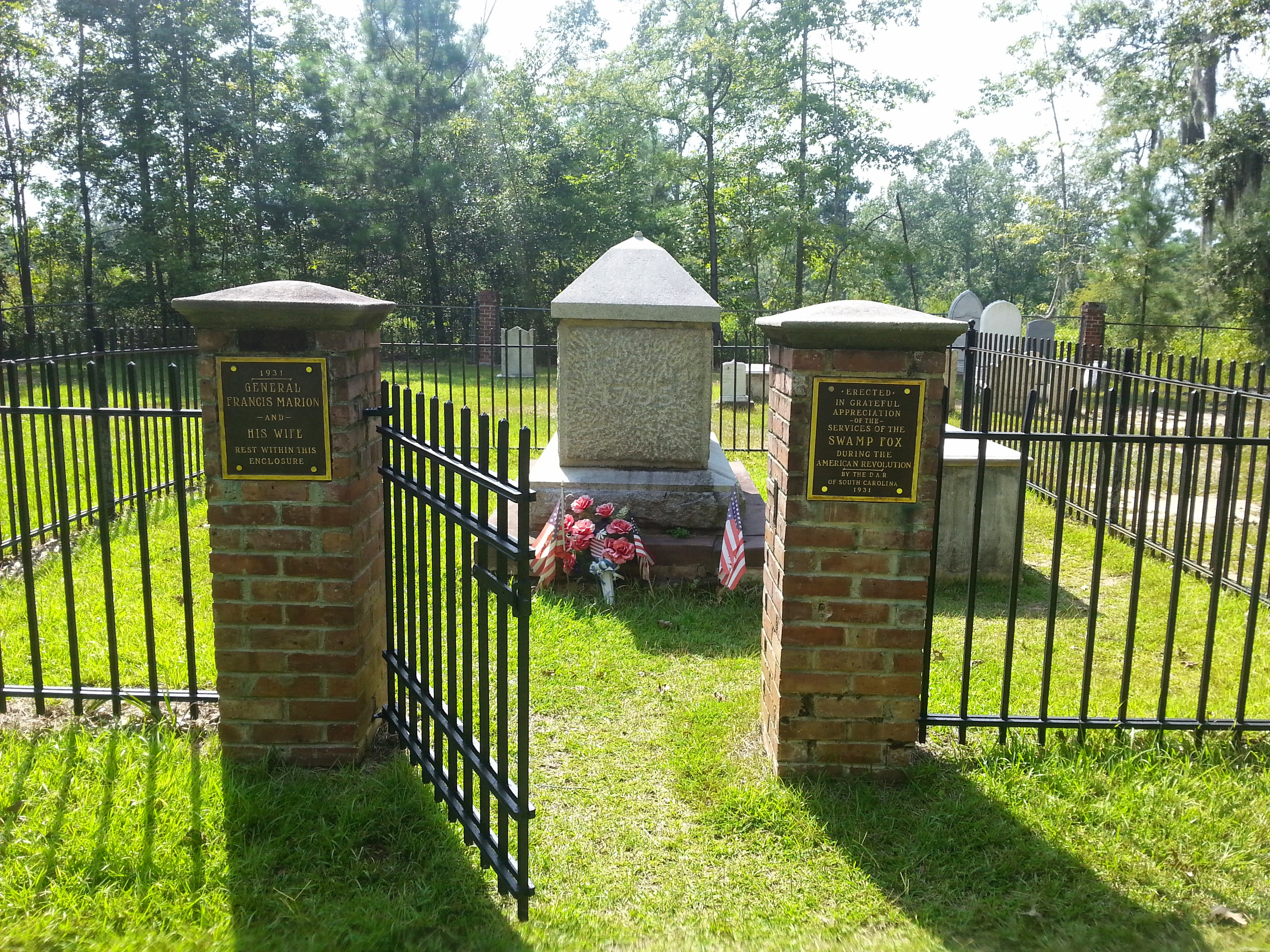
Final resting place of Marion

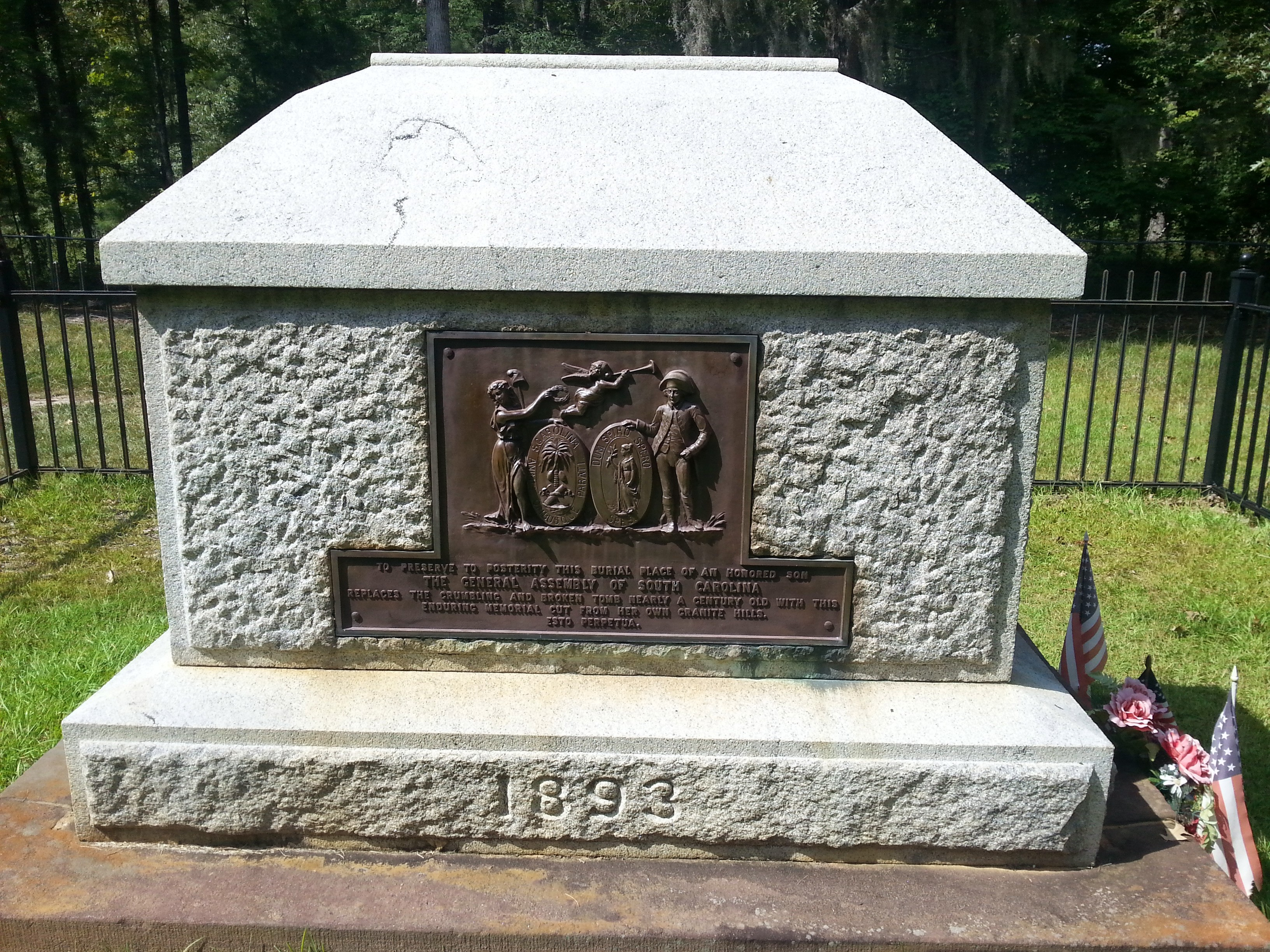
Final resting place of Marion

== See also ==
- Early history of Williamsburg, South Carolina

== Bibliography ==
- Bass, Robert D. Swamp Fox. 1959.
- Boddie, William Willis. History of Williamsburg. Columbia, SC: State Co., 1923.
- Boddie, William Willis. Marion's Men: A List of Twenty-Five Hundred. Charleston, SC: Heisser Print Co., 1938.
- Boddie, William Willis. Traditions of the Swamp Fox: William W. Boddie's Francis Marion. Spartanburg, SC: Reprint Co. 2000.
- Busick, Sean R. A Sober Desire for History: William Gilmore Simms as Historian. 2005. ISBN 1-57003-565-2.
- Cate, Alan C. Founding Fighter: The Battlefield Leaders Who Made American Independence. Praeger, 2006.
- Oller, John. The Swamp Fox: How Francis Marion Saved the American Revolution. Boston: Da Capo Press, 2016. ISBN 978-0-306-82457-9.
- Risjord, Norman K. Representative Americans: The Revolutionary Generation. Rowman & Littlefield, 2001.
- Simms, W.G. The Life of Francis Marion. New York, 1833.
- Myers, Jonathan. Swamp Fox: Birth of a Legend. Ambition Studios, 2004.
- Young, Jeffrey Robert. Domesticating Slavery: The Master Class in Georgia and South Carolina, 1670–1837. University of North Carolina Press, 1999.
- Wickwire, Franklin and Mary. Cornwallis and the War of Independence. John Dickens & Co, 1970.
