= Anna King =

Anna King may refer to:

- Anna King (writer) (1948–2003), English author
- Anna King (artist) (born 1984), Scottish landscape artist
- Anna King (singer) (1937–2002), American soul and gospel singer
- Anna Josepha King (1765–1844), wife of Philip Gidley King, Governor of New South Wales

== See also ==
- King Anna
- Anna and the King, a 1999 biographical drama film
- Ann King (disambiguation)
- King (surname)
