= Banastre Tarleton =

British general during the American War of Independence (1754–1833)

General Sir Banastre Tarleton GCB Bt
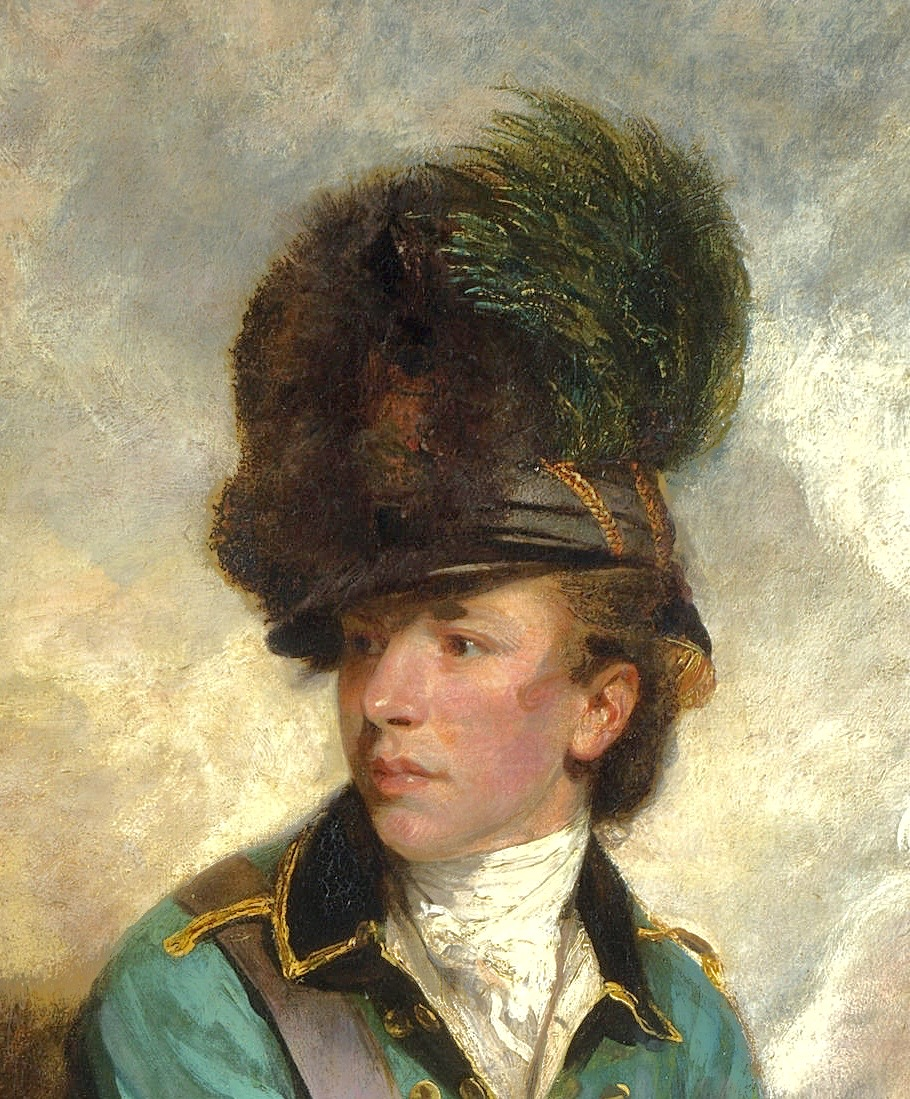
- Detail of Portrait of Banastre Tarleton by Joshua Reynolds, c. 1782

Member of the Great Britain Parliament for Liverpool
- In office 1790–1800 Serving with Bamber Gascoyne (1790–1796); Isaac Gascoyne (1796–1800)
- Preceded by: Richard Pennant; Bamber Gascoyne
- Succeeded by: Parliament of Great Britain dissolved

Member of Parliament for Liverpool
- In office 1801–1806 Serving with Isaac Gascoyne
- Preceded by: New Parliament
- Succeeded by: William Roscoe; Isaac Gascoyne
- In office 1807–1812 Serving with Isaac Gascoyne
- Preceded by: William Roscoe; Isaac Gascoyne
- Succeeded by: George Canning; Isaac Gascoyne

Governor of Berwick-upon-Tweed
- In office 1808–1833
- Preceded by: Viscount Howe
- Succeeded by: Sir James Bathrust

Personal details
- Born: 21 August 1754 Liverpool, Lancashire, England
- Died: 15 January 1833 (aged 78) Leintwardine, Herefordshire, England
- Party: Whig
- Spouse: Susan Bertie (m. 1798)
- Awards: Knight Grand Cross of the Order of the Bath; Baronet
- Nickname: Ban

Military service
- Allegiance: Great Britain (1775–1801); United Kingdom (1801–1812)
- Branch/service: British Army
- Rank: General
- Unit: 1st Dragoon Guards
- Commands: British Legion
- Battles/wars: American Revolutionary War; Siege of Charleston; Battle of Monck's Corner; Battle of Lenud's Ferry; Battle of Waxhaws; Battle of Fishing Creek; Battle of Camden; Battle of Blackstock's Farm; Battle of Cowpens; Battle of Cowan's Ford; Battle of Torrence's Tavern; Battle of Summerfield; Battle of Wetzell's Mill; Battle of Guilford Courthouse (WIA); Battle of Green Spring; Siege of Yorktown

General Sir Banastre Tarleton, 1st Baronet, GCB (21 August 1754 – 15 January 1833) was a British military officer and politician. He was the leader of the British Legion during the southern campaign of the American War of Independence.

After promotion to lieutenant colonel, he later served in Portugal and held commands in Ireland and England, eventually reaching the rank of General in his later years.

After returning to Great Britain in 1781, Tarleton was elected to Parliament as a member for Liverpool. He served as a prominent Whig politician for 20 years.

== Early life ==
Banastre (Note: Pronounced like “bannister”) Tarleton was the third of seven children born to merchant John Tarleton and his wife in Liverpool, England. His birthplace at 7 Water Street is marked by a plaque at the corner with Fenwick Street (53.4065°N 2.9922°W). Tarleton's father had prospered in the West Indian sugar trade and also managed several slaving vessels. Tarleton’s & Backhouse became one of the largest import-export companies in Britain. The family had trade interests throughout America and dealt in many cargoes, including slaves.

Tarleton was educated at Oxford, attending University College. He was further educated at Middle Temple, London, which served as a college for the education of lawyers during this period.

In 1775 he purchased a commission as a cornet (junior cavalry officer) in the 1st Dragoon Guards (effective from 2 May 1775). He proved to be a gifted horseman and leader of troops, working up to lieutenant colonel without having to purchase any further commissions.

== American War of Independence/American Revolution ==
In December 1775, Banastre Tarleton sailed from Cork to North America, where the American War of Independence (1775–1783) had broken out. Tarleton sailed with Lord Cornwallis as part of an expedition to capture the southern city of Charleston, South Carolina. After that expedition failed at the Battle of Sullivan's Island (28 June 1776), Tarleton went north to join the main British Army under command of General William Howe, in New York.

Under the command of Colonel William Harcourt, Tarleton, as a cornet, was part of a scouting party sent to gather intelligence on the movements of General Charles Lee in New Jersey. On 13 December 1776, Tarleton surrounded a house in Basking Ridge, and forced Lee, still in dressing gown, to surrender, as he threatened to burn down the house. General Lee was taken to New York as a prisoner of war. He later was used in an exchange of prisoners.

In the course of the colonial war in North America, Cornet Tarleton's campaign service during 1776 earned him the position of brigade major at the end of the year. He was promoted to captain on 13 June 1778. Late in 1777, Tarleton was in action at Brandywine, the capture and defence of Germantown, and the capture of Philadelphia and at other battles in 1778. One such battle, in 1778, was an attack upon a communications outpost on Signal Hill in Easttown Township, Chester County, Pennsylvania, which was guarded by troops commanded by Capt. Henry Lee III, of the Continental Army, who repulsed the British attack.

=== Capture of Charleston ===
After becoming commander of the British Legion, a force of American Loyalist cavalry and light infantry, Tarleton went to South Carolina at the beginning of 1780. There, the capture of Charleston was the first step in regaining control of the southern provinces. The Legion supported Sir Henry Clinton in the operations which culminated in the British capture of Charleston, earning Tarleton praise in Clinton's despatch.

=== Battle of Waxhaws ===
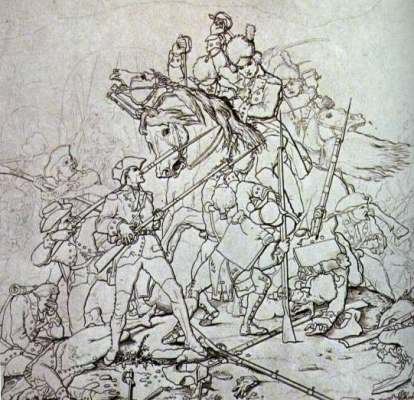
The Battle of Waxhaw Creek (29 May 1780), in Lancaster County, South Carolina

On 29 May 1780, Colonel Tarleton, with a force of 149 mounted soldiers, overtook a detachment of 350 to 380 Virginia Continentals, led by Colonel Abraham Buford. Buford rejected Tarleton's invitation to surrender and continued marching, only ordering his troops to surrender after incurring significant casualties. Nonetheless, fighting continued until 113 soldiers of Buford's detachment were killed, 203 were captured, and 150 were severely wounded. The British army casualties were 5 soldiers killed and 12 soldiers wounded.. The affair is known as the Battle of Waxhaw Creek.

During that time, Patriots used the phrase "Tarleton's quarter" (shooting after surrender) as meaning "no quarter offered".

Forty years later, William Dobein James asked Robert Brownfield, a surgeon’s mate of the wartime Second South Carolina Regiment, for a description of the battle. Brownfield's account, published as an appendix to A Sketch of the Life of Brig. Gen. Francis Marion, said that Colonel Buford raised a white flag of surrender, "expecting the usual treatment sanctioned by civilized warfare". When Buford called for quarter, Colonel Tarleton's horse was shot with a musket ball, trapping him underneath and enraging the Loyalist soldiers who believed their commander had been shot. The Loyalist troops attacked the Virginians and "commenced a scene of indiscriminate carnage never surpassed by the ruthless atrocities of the most barbarous savages"; in the aftermath, the British Legion soldiers purportedly killed wounded soldiers where they lay.

Reports of these atrocities motivated Whig-leaning colonials to support the American Revolution. On 7 October 1780, at the Battle of Kings Mountain, South Carolina, the Overmountain Men (rebel militia), having heard of the slaughter at Waxhaw Creek, killed American Loyalists who had surrendered after a sniper killed their British commanding officer, Maj. Patrick Ferguson.

=== Subsequent operations ===
In South Carolina, Tarleton's British Legion were harried by Francis Marion, an American militia commander who practiced guerrilla warfare against the British, in order to deny resupply of food and horses, cause attrition and reduce reconnoitering. Throughout the campaigns, Tarleton was unable to capture Marion or thwart his operations. Marion's local popularity among anti-British South Carolinians ensured continual aid and comfort for the American cause. In contrast, Colonel Tarleton alienated the colonial citizens with arbitrary confiscations of cattle and food stocks.

At Camden, Tarleton's cavalry delivered the coup de grace against the Continental army when they charged into the rear of the Continental line. The Continental troops broke and fled, and were pursued for more than twenty miles. All the baggage and ordnance of the Continental army were captured, earning Tarleton a commendation from Cornwallis.

On 22 August, he was promoted to major in the 79th Regiment of Foot (Royal Liverpool Volunteers). He defeated Thomas Sumter at Fishing Creek, also called Catawba Fords, but was less successful when he encountered the same general at Blackstock's Farm in November 1780.

On 17 January 1781, Tarleton's forces were virtually destroyed by American Brigadier General Daniel Morgan at the Battle of Cowpens. During his retreat, Tarleton was run down by Col. William Washington, where he lost multiple fingers in a duel with Washington. Tarleton and about 200 men fled the battlefield.

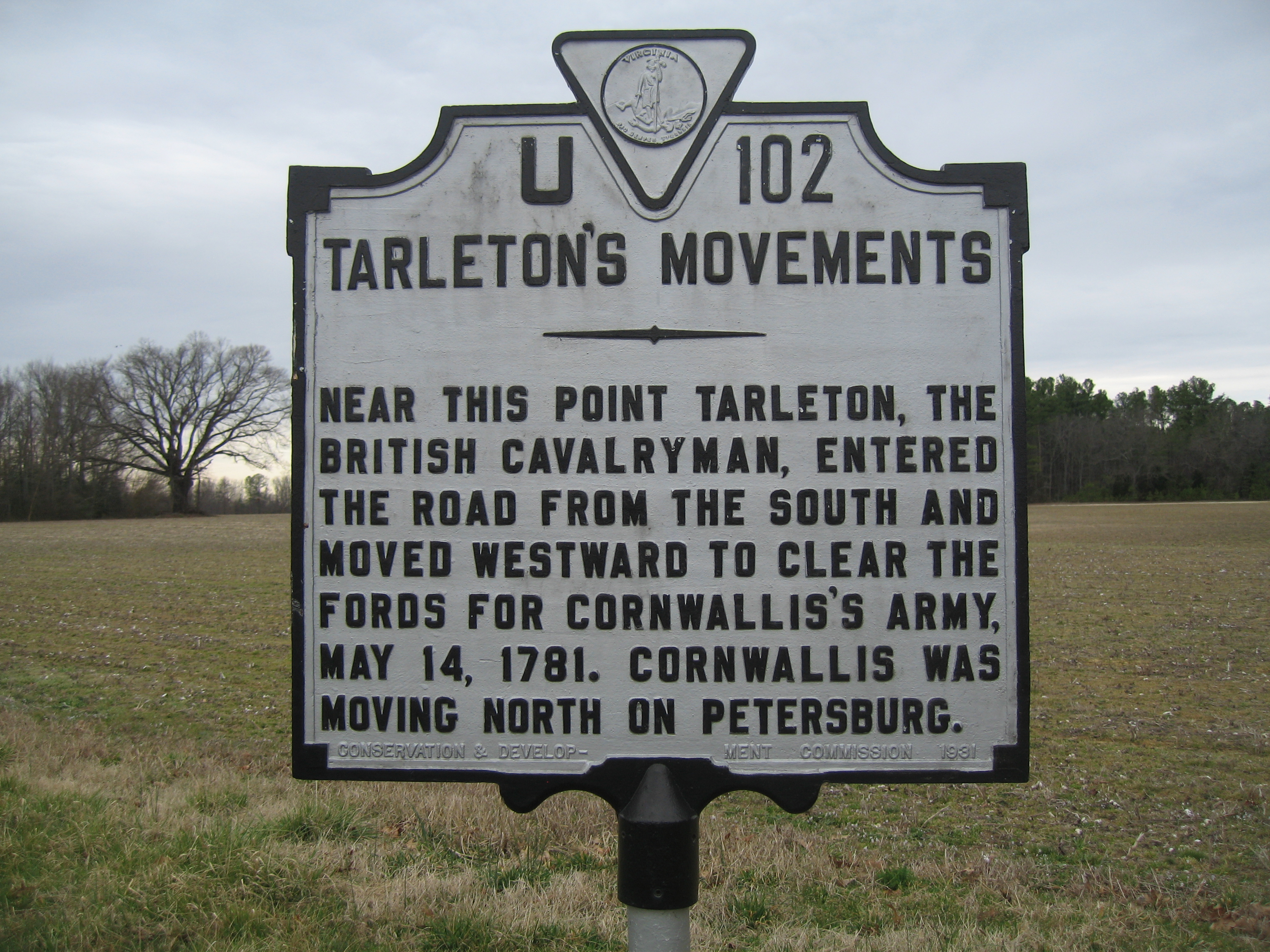
Tarleton's Movements historical marker in Adams Grove, Virginia

He was successful in a skirmish at Torrence's Tavern while the British crossed the Catawba River (Cowan's Ford Skirmish, 1 February 1781) and took part in the Battle of Guilford Courthouse in March 1781. Tarleton marched into Virginia with his men and Cornwallis to carry out a series of small expeditions, including a raid on Charlottesville, where the state government had relocated following the British occupation of the capital at Richmond. He was trying to capture Governor Thomas Jefferson and members of the Virginia General Assembly. The raid was partially foiled by the ride of Jack Jouett, with Jefferson and all but seven of the legislators escaping over the mountains. Tarleton destroyed arms and munitions and succeeded in dispersing the Assembly.

Tarleton was brevetted to lieutenant-colonel in the 79th Foot on 26 June 1781. After other missions, Cornwallis instructed Tarleton to hold Gloucester Point, during the Siege of Yorktown. On 4 October 1781, the French Lauzun's Legion and the British cavalry, commanded by Tarleton, skirmished at Gloucester Point. Tarleton was unhorsed, and Lauzun's Legion drove the British within their lines before being ordered to withdraw by the Marquis de Choisy. Lauzun's Legion suffered three Hussars killed with two officers and eleven Hussars wounded. They reported fifty British were killed or wounded, including Tarleton. The British surrendered Gloucester Point to the French and Americans after the surrender at Yorktown in October 1781. He returned to Britain on parole early in 1782.

== Return to England ==
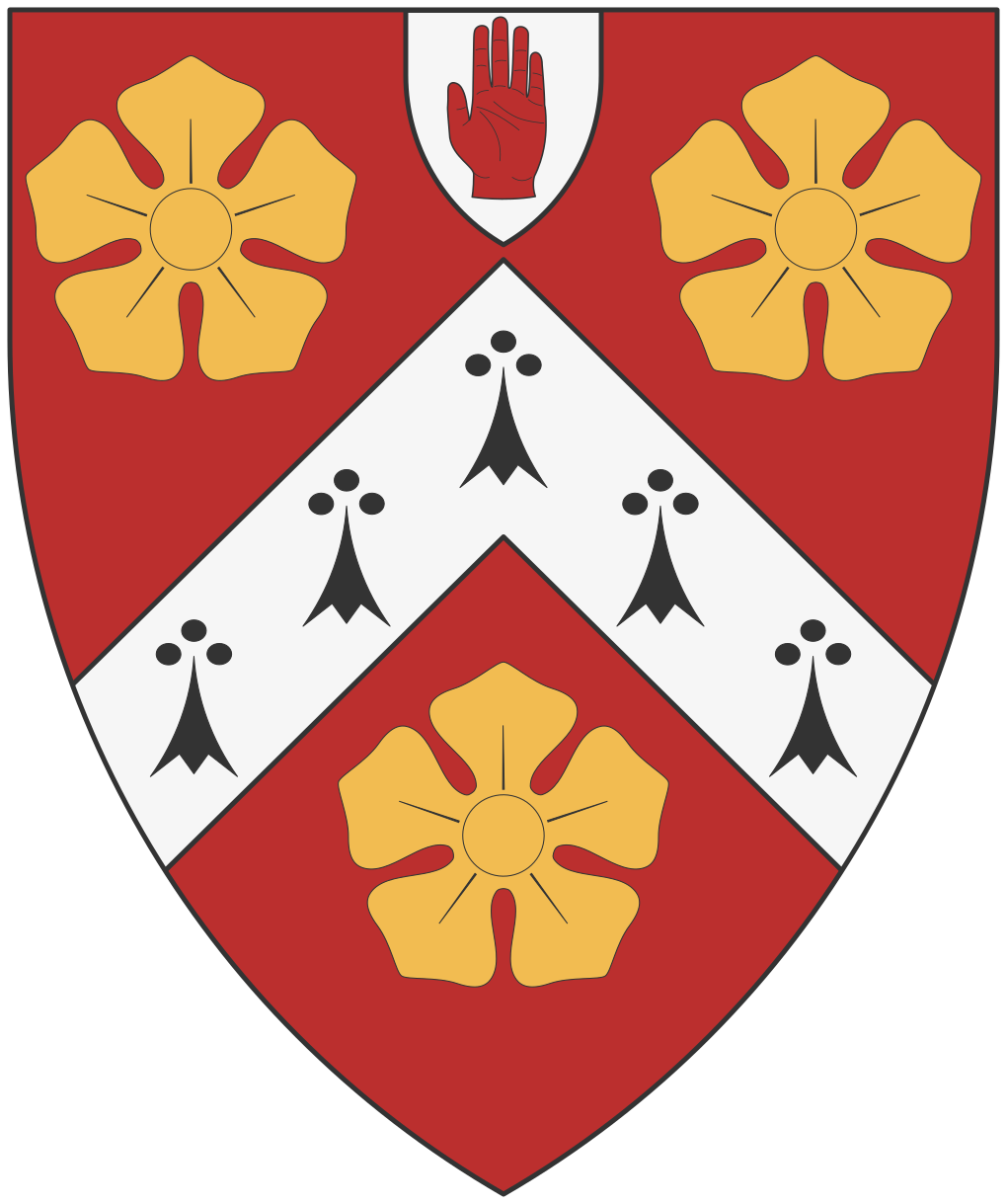
The arms of Sir Banastre Tarleton of Liverpool, 1st Baronet

Banastre Tarleton was hailed as a hero, on his return to "Liverpool in 1782 after legendary exploits in the American war of independence, the church bells rang out and he was feted by admirers." Knight expands on this:

Most British senior officers returned to England after the war to severe criticism from their compatriots ... [They] received varying degrees of blame and censure for the loss of the American colonies. But Tarleton was almost unique in attracting no such rebuke. ... he was received home with universal acclaim, being feted at court and becoming an intimate friend to two future kings, George Prince of Wales and William Duke of Clarence ...

=== Portraiture ===
Tarleton sat for portraits by three leading artists in London: Reynolds, Gainsborough, and Cosway.

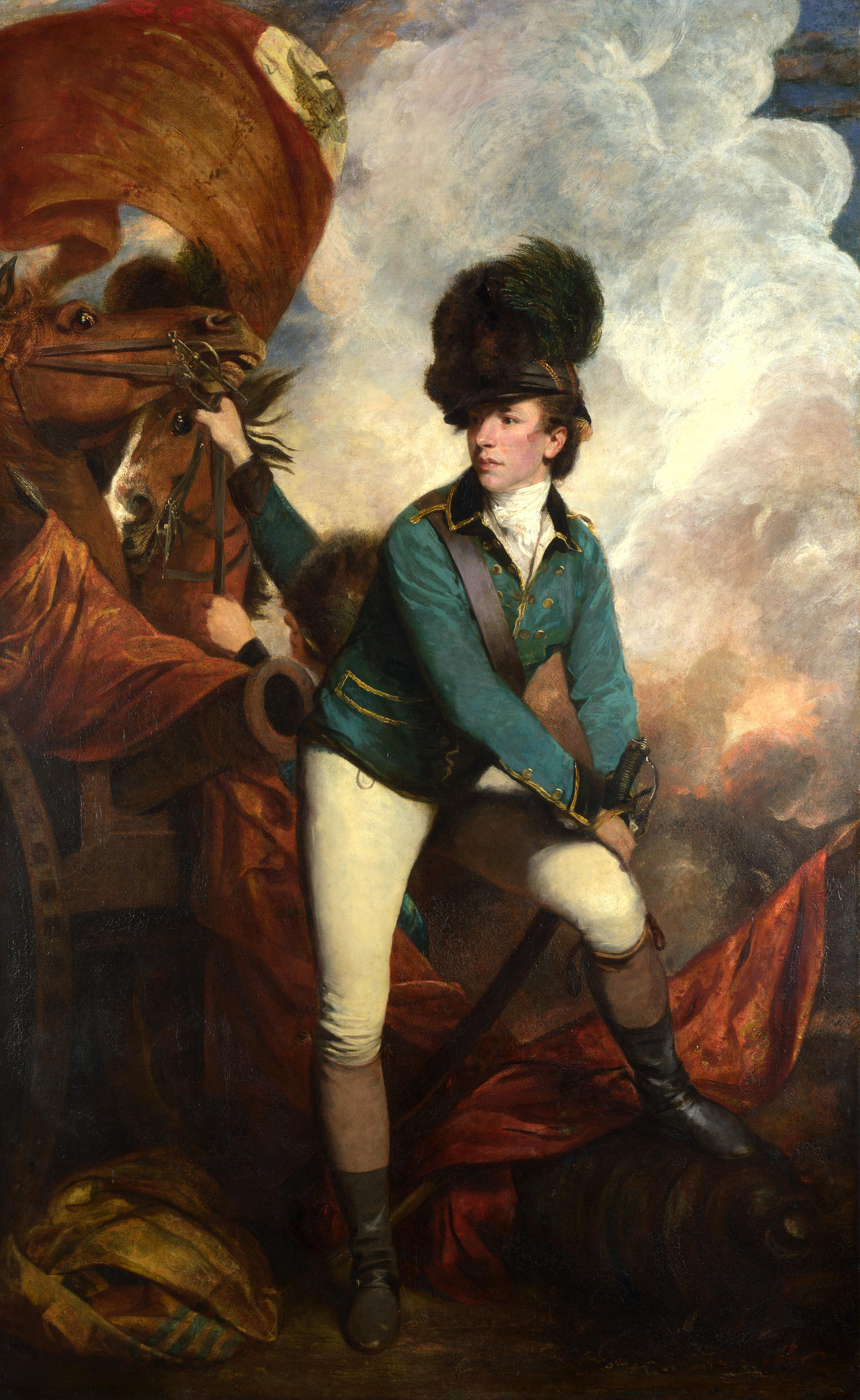
Banastre Tarleton, portrait by Sir Joshua Reynolds

Tarleton’s brother commissioned Sir Joshua Reynolds' well-known painting of Banastre for their mother. (Note: In 1951, it was bequeathed to the National Gallery of the UK by Mrs Henrietta Charlotte Tarleton.) "Colonel Tarleton", now in the National Gallery, is regarded as one of the finest examples of Reynolds' work and portraiture in general. The full-length 236 cm × 145.5 cm (7 ft 8.9 in × 4 ft 9.3 in) painting is described by the National Gallery:

Reynolds portrays Tarleton momentarily dismounted on a battlefield, with gun-smoke swirling behind him. Wearing the uniform of the British Legion, he props one leg up on a cannon to re-fix his sword to his belt before changing horses. Reynolds frequently drew on ideas from old master paintings, drawings and antique sculpture for his compositions. Tarleton's pose appears to be based on works by Rembrandt, Tintoretto and an ancient Roman sculpture of Hermes. (Note: Such a pose was also used by Gian Lorenzo Bernini in his "David", and it is also reminiscent of the much older The Discus Thrower by Myron)

— The National Gallery, "Colonel Tarleton by Sir Joshua Reynolds" (2023)

The pose disguises Tarleton's mutilated right hand, of which he lost two fingers to a musket ball at the Battle of Guilford Court House. The flags are unidentified. The Reynolds painting was shown at the Royal Academy later in the year.

Thomas Gainsborough's equestrian portrait of Tarleton, on an even larger canvas, was also exhibited in 1782.

The portrait by the third artist, Richard Cosway, is on quite a different scale, as miniatures met the need for images which could be transported easily. His miniature of Banastre Tarleton is in a private collection and a photograph of it is copyrighted.

=== Recriminations ===
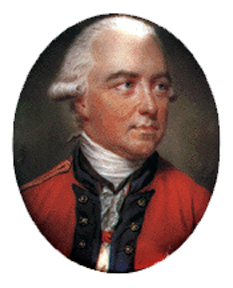
General Sir Henry Clinton

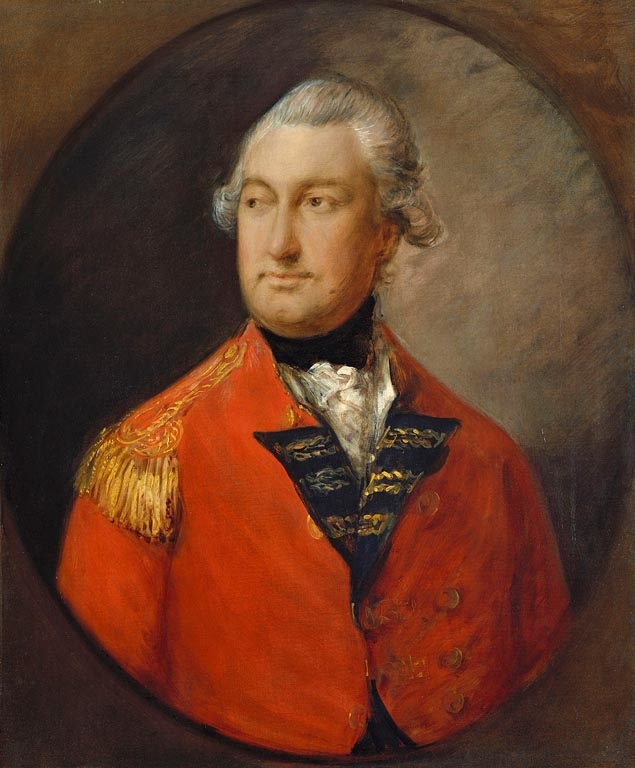
General Charles, Earl Cornwallis (1738–1805)

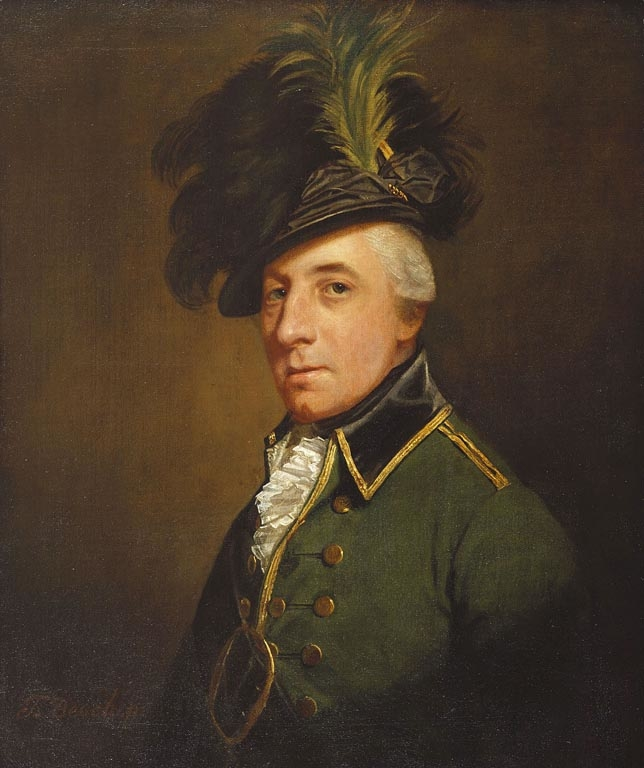
Major George Hanger, later Lord Coleraine (1751–1824), in the uniform of the British Legion

While fighting had finished after the capitulation at Yorktown, soldiers and politicians continued the war over words. The London Morning Chronicle printed an anonymous letter castigating Tarleton on 9 August 1782, with Lieutenant Roderick MacKenzie as a likely author. MacKenzie had been a junior officer of the 71st Regiment of Foot (Fraser's Highlanders). He was wounded and captured at the Battle of Cowpens for which he blamed Tarleton. (Note: There is no Lieutenant Roderick Mackenzie on the list of officers in 1776 so he probably joined the regiment later. The name is variously spelt—Mackenzie, M'Kenzie, MacKenzie—as were such Scottish surnames of the period. His own book uses "Mackenzie". While a Lieutenant Roderick Mackenzie of the 71st was killed on the 15th of May 1792 during the advance on Seringapatam, India, the name was quite common. George Hanger referred to him as "late of the 71st regiment" suggesting he did not remain in the army.) Agniel wrote: "If one takes exception to the premise that Lieutenant MacKenzie loathed his commanding officer, it is entirely feasible to substitute any other verb which means roughly the same thing." Babits noted "Lieutenant Roderick MacKenzie and others had clear bias and slanted their accounts to suit their own purposes ... MacKenzie hated Banastre Tarleton". Buchanan said Mackenzie "bore considerable personal animosity against Tarleton".

Subsequent letters extended Mackenzie's criticism to Cornwallis and Clinton, and continued to attack Tarleton for years. As the events of 1781, the year of the defeat at Cowpens and the surrender at Yorktown, were picked apart, the principal actors responded. Clinton's account was first, in 1783. He held that "none of the misfortunes of the very unfortunate campaign of 1781 can, with the smallest degree of justice, be imputed to me." Cornwallis rebutted Clinton's claims the same year. They continued to trade rhetorical shots for years after the treaty was signed, attempting to prove themselves blameless for the loss of thirteen of the provinces in North America. Responsibility for the events became a subject of general discussion and gossip. Tarleton became a focus of the controversy due to the loss of the light infantry at Cowpens. However, according to Anthony J. Scotti, the criticism of Tarleton "was fuelled by resentment and jealousy".

Tarleton defended himself in his 1787 book, History of the Campaigns of 1780 and 1781 in the Southern Provinces of North America. Mackenzie followed by compiling his letters into a book, and explicitly criticised Tarleton's account almost line by line. The Cornwallis Correspondence also included responses. Major George Hanger (Lord Coleraine) published a rebuttal to Mackenzie in his "Address to the Army".

== Later military career ==
Tarleton continued to serve in the British Army and was promoted to colonel on 22 November 1790, to major-general on 4 October 1794 and to lieutenant-general on 1 January 1801. Whilst on service in Portugal, Tarleton succeeded William Henry Vane, 3rd Earl of Darlington as colonel of the Princess of Wales's Fencible Dragoons in 1799. Tarleton was appointed colonel of the 21st Light Dragoons on 24 July 1802. He was brevetted to general on 1 January 1812. He had hoped to be appointed to command British forces in the Peninsular War, but the position was instead given to Wellington. He held a military command in Ireland and another in England.

Tarleton had lost two fingers from a musket ball received in his right hand during the Battle of Guilford Courthouse in North Carolina, but "his crippled hand was to prove an electoral asset" back home. The condition of his hand is disguised in the pose of his 1782 portrait (shown in this article) by Sir Joshua Reynolds.

== Member of Parliament ==
Tarleton first stood as a Whig candidate for Liverpool in the 1784 general election. He was narrowly defeated by Richard Pennant as the second MP of this borough constituency. In the 1790 general election Pennant was ahead in the poll, but withdrew in favour of Tarleton. With the exception of a single year, Tarleton was re-elected to the House of Commons until 1812. Throughout his tenure in Parliament, he generally voted with the Parliamentary opposition. He was also a supporter of Charles James Fox despite their opposing views on the British role in the American War of Independence.

Tarleton was known for speaking on military matters as well as opposing abolition of the slave trade. Thorne wrote "most of his speeches in his first two sessions in the House assailed the 'mistaken philanthropy' of abolishing the slave trade, which Liverpool Members were instructed to oppose."

== Appointments ==
He was appointed governor of Berwick and Holy Island in 1808.

On 23 January 1816, he was made a baronet; and in 1820 a Knight Grand Cross of the Order of the Bath (GCB).

== Personal life ==
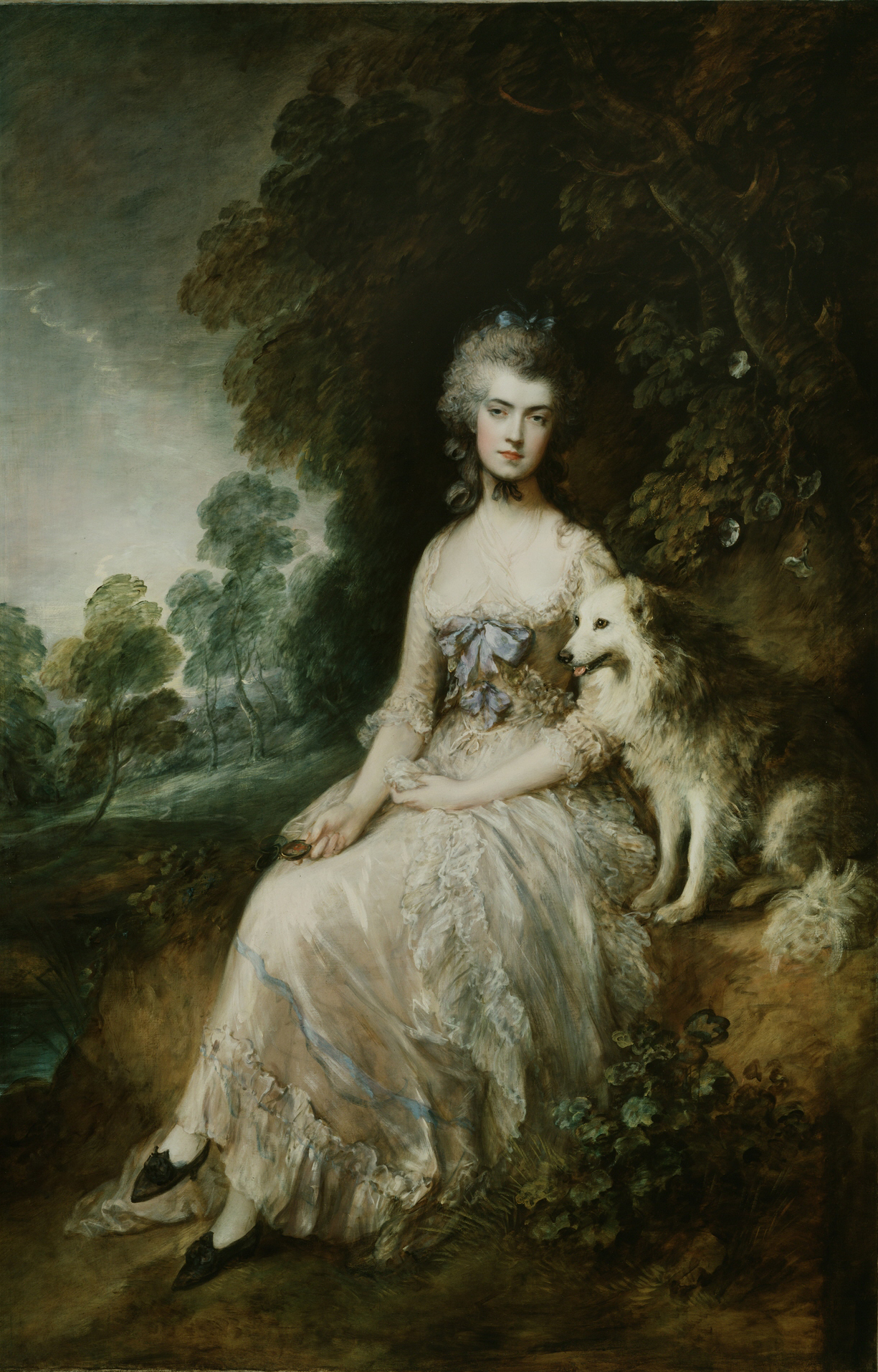
Portrait of Mary Robinson by Thomas Gainsborough, 1781

Tarleton had a 15-year relationship with the actress and writer Mary Robinson, known as Perdita, the character she played to much acclaim. She was an ex-mistress of the Prince of Wales (future King George IV). Tarleton and Robinson had no children; in 1783 Robinson had a miscarriage.

On 17 December 1798, Tarleton married Susan Priscilla Bertie, the daughter of Robert Bertie, 4th Duke of Ancaster. They had no children.

== Death ==
Tarleton died on 16 January 1833, at Leintwardine, Herefordshire and was buried at St Mary Magdalene Church. There is a monument to him on the west wall of the Mortimer chapel. It is inscribed:

NEAR THIS PLACE ARE DEPOSITED THE MORTAL REMAINS OF
SIR BANASTRE TARLETON BARONET
GENERAL IN THE ARMY, KNIGHT GRAND CROSS OF THE ORDER OF THE BATH,
GOVERNOR OF BERWICK UPON TWEED, AND COLONEL OF THE GALLANT 8TH HUSSARS.
HE REPRESENTED HIS NATIVE TOWN LIVERPOOL DURING SEVEN SESSIONS
AND CLOSED HIS DISTINGUISHED CAREER AT THIS PLACE, JANUARY 16TH 1833, AGED 78.

HE WAS A TENDER HUSBAND, AN INDULGENT MASTER, AND A LIBERAL BENEFACTOR OF THE POOR.
THIS MONUMENT IS ERECTED TO HIS MEMORY BY HIS BEREAVED WIDOW AS A TESTIMONY OF HER AFFECTION, BUT HE HAS RAISED A MORE IMPERISHABLE MEMORIAL FOR HIMSELF IN THE ANNALS OF HIS COUNTRY AND IN THE HEARTS OF MANY FRIENDS.

== Legacy ==
=== Tarleton helmet ===
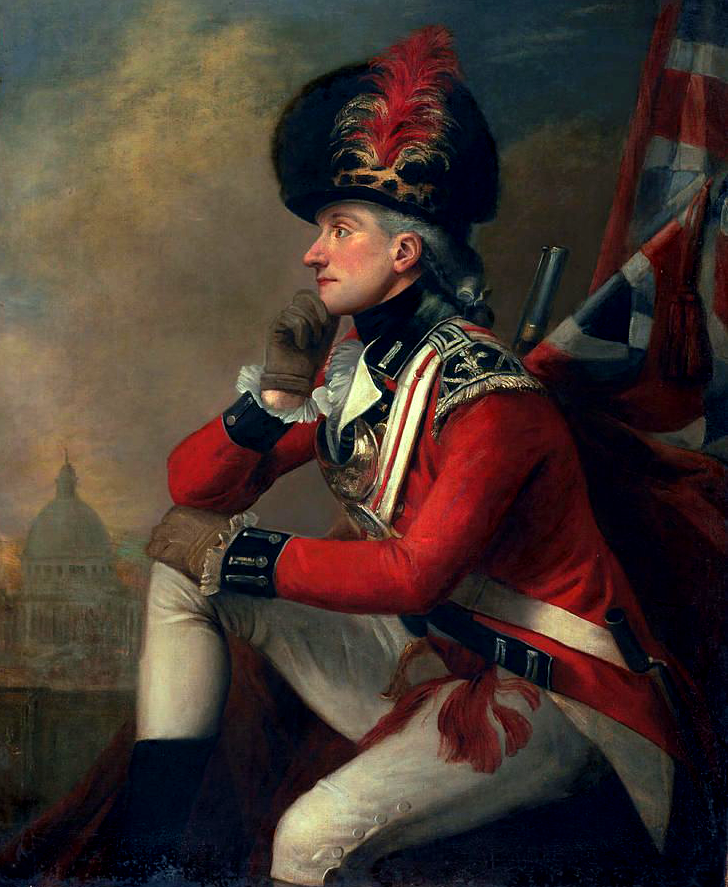
Major John André wearing a Tarleton helmet

During the American War of Independence, Tarleton made popular a leather helmet with antique style applications and a fur plume (woolen for lower ranks) protruding far into the upper front side. It was based on the Continental European dragoon helmet that became popular in several other armies before it fell out of fashion. Sir Joshua Reynolds' portrait of Tarleton shows him wearing the helmet; it was worn by all ranks in the British Legion. Royal Horse Artillery troops wore the helmet until the end of the Napoleonic Wars, as did light dragoon regiments from about 1796 to 1812.

=== Auction of captured battle flags ===
In 2006, four Patriot regimental colours captured by Tarleton in 1779 and 1780 were auctioned by Sotheby's in New York City. The flags sold for US$17.3 million at auction on Flag Day in the United States on 14 June 2006.

Lot 1 was the colour of the 2nd Continental Light Dragoons (Sheldon's Dragoons), captured by the British Legion at Pound Ridge on 2 July 1779. It is the earliest surviving American flag of any kind with thirteen horizontal red and white stripes. Including its silver metallic fringe, the silk flag is 35 1/8 inches (hoist) × 38 3/4 inches (fly). In the centre, there is a square of red silk bordered in gold and black. On it is a painted badge of a winged dark storm cloud from which ten gold and orange thunderbolts are emanating. Below that is the motto "PAT:A CONCITA FULM:NT NATI" (roughly translated, "When their country calls, her sons answer in tones of thunder").

Lot 2 was the complete stand of three regimental colours of the 3rd Virginia Detachment. The British Legion, commanded by Tarleton, captured them at the Battle of Waxhaws on 29 May 1780. They are the only remaining intact stand of colours from the Revolution. The 50 1/4 inches (hoist) × 45 3/8 inches (fly) regimental flag is the oldest surviving American flag having a canton of five-pointed stars. It is of gold silk painted with a beaver felling a palmetto tree. Below that is the motto "Perseverando". At the upper hoist is a blue silk canton with thirteen stars. It is very similar to No. 7 described in the 1778 inventory "A Return of ye New Standards & Division Colours for ye Army of ye United States of America In Possession of Major Jonathan Gostelowe, Comy. Mily. Stores".

=== Places named for Banastre Tarleton ===
- A house at the site of the skirmish in Easttown Township after the Battle of Brandywine came to be known as Tarleton. A school later based there was also named Tarleton.
- The General Tarleton Inn in Ferrensby, North Yorkshire, is named after him.
- A street, still in existence, was named for Banastre Tarleton—others for Howe and Rawdon—in Freetown, the Sierra Leone colony established by former slaves.

=== Representation in other media ===
- In the 1835 novel Horse-Shoe Robinson by John Pendleton Kennedy, a romance during the Southern campaign, characters interact with Tarleton, a forceful martial character, sensitive to the duties of honour and chivalry.
- The 1959–1961 American Disney television series The Swamp Fox is about the American War of Independence. Partisan Francis Marion was played by Canadian actor Leslie Nielsen, while British actor John Sutton portrayed Colonel Banastre Tarleton.
- In the novel Sharpe's Eagle by Bernard Cornwell (the first in the Richard Sharpe series), the novel's main antagonist, Colonel Sir Henry Simmerson, is said to be a cousin of Tarleton. He relies on his cousin's political connections to support his position.
- In the 1986 film Sweet Liberty Tarleton is played by actor Michael Caine and portrayed to the history professor Michael Burgess' (Alan Alda) dismay as a romantic, dashing hero.
- In the 2000 film The Patriot, the fictitious Colonel William Tavington is often said to be based on Tarleton and the hero, Benjamin Martin, on Francis Marion. However, this hasn't been confirmed by anyone involved with the script.
- In the 2006 film Amazing Grace, Tarleton is played by Ciarán Hinds and is portrayed as a leading opponent of William Wilberforce's abolition bill.

== Perceptions ==
Numerous tales about Tarleton exist. Verified facts are included in the biographical information above. Stories without verified sources are discussed here.

=== Slave trade ===
Banastre Tarleton was not engaged in the slave trade. As a child in Liverpool, he benefited from his father’s mercantile business, which included chartering ships, some of which carried slaves. But, as an adult, he did not join the business.

Tarleton is not listed by the Centre for the Study of the Legacies of British Slavery, which is based at University College London, nor by the Slave Voyages database, begun at Emory University, now hosted at Rice University. Furthermore, unlike many of the Patriots he fought, Banastre Tarleton never owned slaves.

Nevertheless, after his election to Parliament in 1790, Tarleton often spoke against the abolition of the slave trade: "most of his speeches in his first two sessions in the House assailed the 'mistaken philanthropy' of abolishing the slave trade, which Liverpool Members were instructed to oppose."

=== Wounds ===
Lee claimed to have wounded Tarleton in Pennsylvania. William Washington was said to have wounded him at the Battle of Cowpens. Tilden reported that Tarleton had been wounded during the siege of Yorktown. According to Tarleton's history of his service, he was only wounded once, at the Battle of Guilford Courthouse. While his maimed hand was disguised in his famous portrait, he proudly showed it in politics as evidence of having served his country.

=== Raiders ===
The British Legion is occasionally referred to as 'Tarleton's Raiders" in modern American sources. However, during its service in the American War of Independence, the British Legion was most often called Tarleton's Legion. Lawrence Babits wrote of the unit’s formation:

These companies were combined into the British Legion in June and July 1778 ... Thereafter, the history of the British Legion, or Tarleton's legion, as it came to be known, was the history of Tarleton in America.

Modern historians also use that name. For example, in Cavalry of the American Revolution, Jim Piecuch says "Dockerty's statement provides clear evidence of Americans switching sides in the South and Continentals enlisting in Tarleton's Legion." In the same book, Scott Miskimon writes "Before the Americans could bridle a single horse, Tarleton's Legion charged ..."

Thomas Raddall, a prolific writer on historical subjects, said of the British Legion:

Of all the loyalists who fought in the War of the American Revolution none were more famous in their day than those who formed the British Legion, generally known as Tarleton's Legion.

Only after the American Civil War was the British Legion sometimes called "Tarleton's Raiders" by analogy with some Confederate units of that war. Knight explained:

The "Tarleton's raiders" tag occurred with increasing regularity after the American Civil War. Various Confederate partisan and guerrilla cavalry units, like Mosby's and Quantrill's, came to be named after their commanding officers, and [American] writers began following the same fashion with the British Legion, the corps that Tarleton commanded. But the British Legion was never an irregular partisan unit, and though it carried out many daring raids, it was a mixed force of dragoon cavalry, light Infantry and small calibre artillery. Indeed, it was taken onto the British regular establishment in 1782, conferring on it official recognition of its prowess.

=== Epithets ===
In the United States, Banastre Tarleton is often disparaged as "Bloody Tarleton" or "Bloody Ban" in modern histories. But this label was not used by his contemporaries. Scotti searched fruitlessly for examples of "Bloody Tarleton" before the twentieth century. He concluded "with some degree of certainty" that Robert Bass was an early writer to use the term. John Pancake varied it to "Bloody Ban" in 1985. Later, Scotti elaborated:

In 1957, Robert Duncan Bass coined the phrase in his eloquent biography of Tarleton ... With the publication of The Green Dragoon, "Bloody Tarleton" became a part of the American heritage and the national psyche.

Knight agreed with that origin, saying

Both labels appear no earlier than the 1950s, originating in the Robert Bass book The Green Dragoon.

and

The two personal monikers, the alternatingly violent and romantic caricatures by which Tarleton is now largely known, are sobriquets of pure fiction. There is no evidence that Tarleton was ever referred to by either name ...

=== Social rejection by American officers ===
Several writers have said that, after the surrender, Tarleton was the sole British senior officer not invited to dinner with any American officers. Where a source is given, it is the 1860 book of George Washington Parke Custis, a step-grandson of General Washington. Custis wrote "Colonel Tarleton ... was left out in the invitations to headquarters." He bases this on an alleged meeting between Tarleton and Lieutenant Colonel John Laurens about military etiquette. Scotti searched many sources, in particular the writing of Laurens and the Marquis de La Fayette, to whom Custis claimed Tarleton first complained. He found no indication that any such meeting took place and considers the incident to be apocryphal. Supporting Scotti's conclusion, a 1978 book about the end of the war, The Campaign That Won America: The Story of Yorktown, authored by Burke Davis, mentions only that "all the ranking British and German officers were invited". Tarleton wasn't evacuated before the surrender along with some Legion members who were deemed at risk.

== Sources ==
Some of the more notable authors of books relating to Tarleton point out the extreme bias in the accounts of Roderick Mackenzie. A few independent assessments of the sources are provided to guide the reader.

- Agniel, Lucien (June 1972). The Late Affair Has Almost Broke My Heart: The American Revolution in the South, 1780–1781. Chatham Press. ISBN 978-0-85699-036-6.
- Babits, Lawrence E. (1998). A Devil of a Whipping: The Battle of Cowpens. Chapel Hill: University of North Carolina Press. ISBN 978-0-8078-4926-2.
- Baskin, Marge (2025). "Oatmeal for the Foxhounds". Archived from the original on 7 July 2012.
  - “…thanks to Marge Baskin for…sharing her research on [Christian] Huck, Banastre Tarleton, Lord Rawdon, and other British and Provincial officers [on] Oatmeal for the Foxhounds: Banastre Tarleton and the British Legion”
- Bass, Robert (1957). The Green Dragoon. New York: Holt.
  - "Dr. Bass accepts the worst interpretation of some events such as Waxhaws, and he allows a number of folk myths to creep into the book as 'facts,' but it is obvious that he developed an fondness for his subject during a decade of research and tried to give him a fair deal."
- Brownfield, Robert (1821). "Appendix – the letter of Dr. Robert Brownfield to the author, giving a detailed account of the defeat of Buford's regiment, referred to at page 39. [Chapter II Paragraph 6]". A Sketch of the Life of Brig. Gen. Francis Marion and a History of His Brigade. By James, William Dobein. p. e-book #923 – via Project Gutenburg.
- Buchanan, John (1997). The road to Guilford Courthouse : the American revolution in the Carolinas. New York: Wiley. ISBN 0-471-16402-X.
  - "Buchanan hates, detests and abhors Tarleton. He's occasionally so rabid about it that it is downright funny. He hates Ban so much he even disses the Sir Joshua Reynolds portrait of him."
- Clein, Edwin (30 June 2000). "Patriotic Liverpool up in arms over Gibson's blockbuster". The Guardian. Archived from the original on 23 September 2023.
- Clinton, Henry (1783). Narrative of Lieutenant-General Sir Henry Clinton, K.B., relative to his conduct during part of his command of the king's troops in North America, particularly to that which respects the unfortunate issue of the campaign in 1781 : with an appendix, containing copies and extracts of those parts of his correspondence with Lord George Germain, Earl Cornwallis, Rear Admiral Graves, &c., which are referred to therein. London: Printed for J. Debrett (successor to Mr. Almon). p. 115.
- Clinton, Henry (1971) [1954]. Willcox, William B (ed.). The American rebellion; Sir Henry Clinton's narrative of his campaigns, 1775–1782, with an appendix of original documents. Hamden, Connecticut: Archon Books. p. 658. ISBN 0-208-01022-X.
- Cornwallis, Charles Earl (1866) [1783]. Answer to Sir Henry Clinton's narrative of the campaign in 1781 in North America. Philadelphia: John Campbell. p. 259.
- Custis, George Washington Parke; Lee, Mary Custis (1860). Recollections and Private Memoirs of Washington, by his adopted son George Washington Parke Custis, with a memoir of the author, by his daughter; and illustrative and explanatory notes by Benson J Lossing. New York: Derby & Jackson. ISBN 1143944348.
- Edgar, Walter B (2001). Partisans and Redcoats : the southern conflict that turned the tide of the American Revolution. New York: Morrow. ISBN 978-0-380-97760-4.
- Hanger, George (1789). An address to the Army in reply to Strictures, by Roderick M'Kenzie, (late Lieutenant in the 71st regiment) on Tarleton's History of the Campaigns of 1780 and 1781. London: James Ridgeway. ISBN 978-0-665-20705-1.
- Keltie, John S (1875). History of the Scottish Highlands: Highland clans and Highland regiments, with an account of the Gaelic language, literature, and music. London: W. MacKenzie. p. 501.
- Knight, John (18 August 2016). "Top 10 Banastre Tarleton Myths". Journal of the American Revolution. Westholme. Archived from the original on 29 September 2023.
- Knight, John (2020). War at Saber Point: Banastre Tarleton and the British Legion. Yardley, Pennsylvania: Westholme. ISBN 978-1-59416-352-4.
- Mackenzie, Roderick (1787). Strictures on Lt.-Col. Tarleton's History "of the campaigns of 1780 and 1781, in the southern provinces of North America". London.
  - "If one takes exception to the premise that Lieutenant MacKenzie loathed his commanding officer, it is entirely feasible to substitute any other verb which means roughly the same thing."
- O'Shaughnessy, Andrew (2013). The Men Who Lost America: British Command during the Revolutionary War and the Preservation of the Empire. Oneworld Publications. p. 259. ISBN 978-1-78074-247-2.
- Pancake, John S. (1985). This destructive war: the British campaign in the Carolinas, 1780–1782. University, Alabama: University of Alabama Press. ISBN 9780817301910.
- Pearson, Kenneth (1976). 1776: the British story of the American Revolution (catalogue of an exhibition). London: Times Books. pp. 15–17. ISBN 0723001472.
- Piecuch, Jim (2012). Cavalry of the American Revolution. Yardley, Pennsylvania: Westholme. ISBN 978-1-59416-544-3.
  - Miskimon, Scott A. "Anthony Walton White: A Revolutionary Dragoon". In Piecuch (2012).
- Raddall, Thomas (1949). "Tarleton's Legion". Collections of the Nova Scotia Historical Society. Halifax, Nova Scotia: Nova Scotia Historical Society. Archived from the original on 8 October 2023.
- Reynolds, William R. Jr. (2012). Andrew Pickens: South Carolina Patriot in the Revolutionary War. Jefferson, North Carolina: McFarland & Company. ISBN 978-0-7864-6694-8.
- Scoggins, Michael C. (2005). The Day It Rained Militia: Huck's Defeat and the Revolution in the South Carolina Backcountry, May–July 1780. Charleston, South Carolina: The History Press. ISBN 978-1-59629-015-0. OCLC 60189717.
- Scotti, Anthony J. (2002). Brutal Virtue: The Myth and Reality of Banastre Tarleton. Heritage Books. ISBN 0-7884-2099-2.
- Stedman, Charles (1794). The history of the origin, progress, and termination of the American war. Vol. II. London.
- Tarleton, Banastre (1787). A history of the campaigns of 1780 and 1781, in the southern provinces of North America. London: T. Cadell.
  - "Virtually every subsequent historian writing on the Southern Campaign uses this as a source of information, no matter what they think of its author."
- Thorne, R. G., ed. (1986). "TARLETON, Banastre (1754–1833), of St. James's Place, Mdx.". The History of Parliament: the House of Commons, 1790–1820. The History of Parliament Trust; Secker & Warburg. Archived from the original on 14 September 2023 – via The History of Parliament.
- Vetch, Robert Hamilton (1898). "Tarleton, Banastre" . In Lee, Sidney (ed.). Dictionary of National Biography. Vol. 55. London: Smith, Elder & Co.
- Wilson, David K. (2005). The Southern Strategy: Britain's Conquest of South Carolina and Georgia, 1775–1780. Columbia, South Carolina: University of South Carolina Press. ISBN 1-57003-573-3. OCLC 232001108.

== Notes ==
Parliament of Great Britain
Preceded by Richard Pennant and Bamber Gascoyne	Member of Parliament for Liverpool; 1790–1800; With: Bamber Gascoyne, to 1796; Isaac Gascoyne, from 1796	Parliament of Great Britain abolished
Parliament of the United Kingdom
New parliament	Member of Parliament for Liverpool; 1801–1806; With: Isaac Gascoyne	Succeeded by William Roscoe and Isaac Gascoyne
Preceded by William Roscoe; Isaac Gascoyne	Member of Parliament for Liverpool; 1807–1812; With: Isaac Gascoyne	Succeeded by George Canning; Isaac Gascoyne
Military offices
Preceded by The Viscount Howe	Governor of Berwick-upon-Tweed; 1808–1833	Succeeded by James Bathurst
Baronetage of the United Kingdom
New creation	Baronet (of Liverpool); 1816–1833	Extinct
Preceded by King baronets	Tarleton baronets of Liverpool; 23 January 1816	Succeeded by Ochterlony baronets
