= Anne King =

Anne King may refer to:

- Anne Blunt, 15th Baroness Wentworth (1837–1917), née Anne King-Noel
- Anne King Gregorie (1887–1960), South Carolina historian and professor of history

== See also ==
- Anna King (disambiguation)
- King (surname)
