= Anne King Gregorie =

American historian (1887–1960)

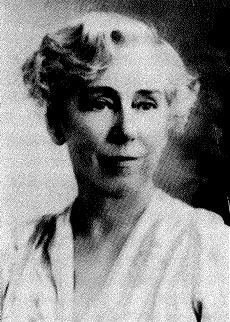
- Born: May 20, 1887 near Savannah, Georgia, U.S.
- Died: December 4, 1960 (aged 73); Charleston, South Carolina, U.S.
- Burial place: Christ Episcopal Churchyard, Mount Pleasant, SC
- Education: Winthrop College; University of Wisconsin–Madison; University of California, Berkeley; University of South Carolina
- Occupations: Historian, Professor
- Organization: South Carolina Historical Society
- Known for: Editor, The South Carolina Historical and Genealogical Magazine, Jan 1947 - Oct 1957
- Notable work: History of Sumter County, South Carolina
- Awards: Award for Merit, 1955, American Association for State and Local History

Anne King Gregorie (May 20, 1887 – December 4, 1960) was a South Carolina historian and professor of history at Arkansas College and at the University of South Carolina, where some of her papers are deposited.

She was the first woman to receive a doctorate from the University of South Carolina, supervised a Works Progress Administration effort to preserve historical records in South Carolina, and advocated for women's rights and improving literacy for everyone. Gregorie wrote the first published biography of General Thomas Sumter as well as comprehensive histories of both Sumter County, SC and of Christ Church, SC, in addition to many other works.

== Early life ==
Born near Savannah, Georgia, Gregorie spent time at Oakland Plantation growing up. It was as a child that she developed a fascination with history, collecting artifacts from the fields near her home and conducting research into the Sewee tribe. She continued excavating for many years, even working alongside Laura Mary Bragg in June 1917 to establish the first records of archaeological sites in the area.

== Education and career ==
Gregorie graduated from Winthrop College in June 1906. She taught in local schools in Lynchburg, Chester, and Christ Church Parish until 1918. Afterwards, she took courses in history and political science at the University of Wisconsin–Madison and the University of California, Berkeley, before returning to South Carolina.

She studied at the University of South Carolina from 1924 to 1929, receiving her master's degree in 1926 and her Ph.D., the first woman to receive one from USC's history department, on June 13, 1929. For her doctoral dissertation, she wrote a biography of Thomas Sumter, which the board at USC accused her of plagiarizing. She had been inducted into Phi Beta Kappa in 1928.

When she published her book on Sumter in 1931, she made no mention of USC as she did not want to "contaminate" them with her "unworthy" writing. The book was the first biography on Sumter to be published, with Gregorie spending a year going through the research compiled by Lyman Draper for inclusion at publication.

Hired to replace a woman leaving the faculty due to her marriage in 1931, Gregorie taught as an associate professor of History at Alabama College in 1932 and 1933. She also taught at Arkansas College.

Gregorie was also director of the South Carolina division of the National Historical Records Survey from March 1934 to 1941. By November 1934, eleven women had been employed to assist in the preservation efforts in South Carolina, with the hours allotted to the effort limited due to a lack of funds from Federal Emergency Relief Administration, the government program overseeing the project.

From January 1947 to October 1957, she was editor for The South Carolina Historical and Genealogical Magazine. She had been a curator for the Magazine from at least January 1934 until she was elected editor. In April 1952, the magazine officially dropped the words "and Genealogical" from the title under Gregorie's direction. She was elected third vice-president of the South Carolina Historical Society at the 100th annual meeting on January 8, 1955. Though some biographers have recorded that she was president of the Society from 1958 to 1959, the 103rd annual meeting of the Society in 1958 re-elected B. Allston Moore as president; in 1959, Gregorie was elected once more to one of the vice-president positions. (Note: Notably, an April 1958 report in The State did say that Dr. Gregorie had been elected president, a direct contradiction to the Society's own record of the election.)

Gregorie was a member of the American Association for State and Local History. They issued her an Award for Merit in 1955 for her book History of Sumter County, South Carolina. The book was praised by Clemson College professor Jack Kenny Williams for its treatment of the various political, economic, and social issues, though Williams did criticize Gregorie not including more on Sumter's history in the twentieth century. It had originally been commissioned in 1945, with a public call for the community's help in providing source material published in The Item.

In addition to the several books she wrote, Gregorie contributed 21 items to the American Dictionary of Biography.

== Activism ==
While teaching at Alabama College, Gregorie gave a radio speech regarding the literacy rate as revealed by the census.

Gregorie helped to found the American Association of University Women's Charleston chapter. On May 13, 1949, Gregorie spoke to the annual convention of the South Carolina chapter advocating for women to be responsible citizens. She was also an active member of the League of Women Voters in 1950, 1951, and 1954. She held positions as a member of the board: legislative chairman and chairman on structure of government until she resigned from the board on July 4, 1954.

On April 5, 1952, speaking at the Oregon Hotel, Gregorie decried the methods employed by B.R. Tillman to win approval for the South Carolina Constitution. During this speech, Gregorie advocated for a new state Constitution, stating that the existing one was incapable of meeting the needs of the people of South Carolina. She blamed it for illiteracy, especially among African-Americans, and was especially critical of the tax burden placed on the contemporary populace of the state in order to provide equal educational opportunities.

== Personal life ==
Flora Belle Surles, with whom Gregorie lived, had a long-standing correspondence with Jeannette Rankin that had begun as early as 1917. Rankin would visit Surles at home in South Carolina and often referred to Gregorie as Surles' "old man". Rankin's sister, Grace, acknowledged both Surles and Gregorie as being in an intimate relationship, and when Rankin's Congressional term ended, both women invited Rankin to come to South Carolina.

== Death ==
After her death at a hospital in Charleston, Gregorie's family donated her library to the South Carolina Historical Society; the Society formally opened the collection for exhibition on December 8, 1963.

== Select publications ==
- Gregorie, Anne King (April 1920). "Cemetery Inscriptions from Christ Church Parish". The South Carolina Historical and Genealogical Magazine. 21 (2): 73–76. JSTOR 27569523.
- Notes on Sewee Indians and Indian remains of Christ Church Parish, Charleston County, South Carolina. Charleston Museum. 1925. LCCN 26005825. OCLC 3614449.
- Indian trade of Carolina in the seventeenth century. University of South Carolina. 1926. OCLC 4425502.
- Thomas Sumter. Columbia: The R.L. Bryan Company. 1931. LCCN 31035119. OCLC 1635192.
- Snowden scrapbook, 1933. 1933. OCLC 761878814.
- "Notes on "The Bedstead Tomb" at St. Michael's". Reprinted from the historical appendix of the Year book of the city of Charleston for the year 1942 by the Historical Commission of Charleston, S.C. The Historical Commission of Charleston, S.C. 1944. pp. 182–210. OCLC 11197106.
- Gregorie, Anne King (July 1945). "John Witherspoon Ervin". The South Carolina Historical and Genealogical Magazine. 46 (3): 166–170. JSTOR 27571840.
- Gregorie, Anne King (July 1948). "Legislators usurp counties". National Municipal Review. 37 (7): 361–363. doi:10.1002/ncr.4110370705. ISSN 0190-3799. OCLC 5154146253.
- History of Sumter County, South Carolina. Library Board of Sumter County. 1954. LCCN 54010612. OCLC 1513426.
- Christ Church, 1706-1959 : a plantation parish of the South Carolina establishment. Charleston: Dalcho Historical Society. 1961. LCCN 95196988. OCLC 2155373.
