= Anna King (writer) =

British writer

Anna King (4 April 1948 – 29 June 2003) was an English author who had ten novels published between 1990 and 2003. Her first book, Life Is Just a Bowl of Cherries, was a semi-autobiographical work dealing with the central character Marie's lifelong struggle with Crohn's disease and its impact on herself and her family.

From Hackney, King's next novels were usually set in the East End of London during the Victorian era, such as Ruby Chadwick, A Handful Of Sovereigns, Frankie's Manor, A Palace of Tears, Fur Coat No Knickers, The Ragamuffins, Luck Be a Lady and Maybe This Time.

King was married and had two children. She died of a stroke, aged 55 on 29 June 2003.
