= Adams Grove, Virginia =

- Unincorporated community
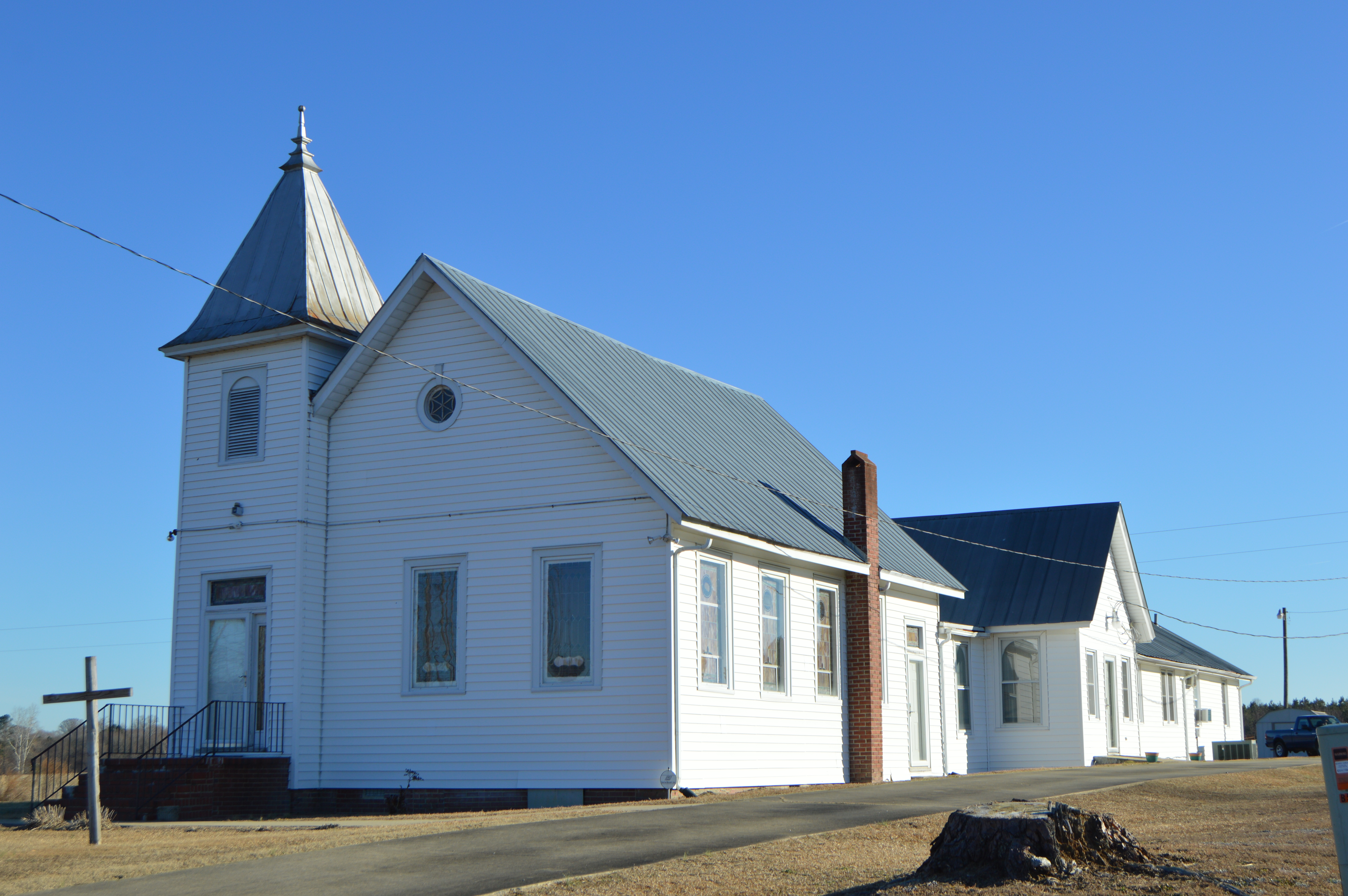
- Baptist church

- Location within Virginia Location within the United States
- Coordinates: 36°41′36″N 77°23′7″W
- Country: United States
- State: Virginia
- County: Southampton
- Elevation: 89 ft (27 m)
- Time zone: UTC-5 (Eastern (EST))
  - Summer (DST): UTC-4 (EDT)
- ZIP Code: 23844
- Area codes: 757, 948
- GNIS feature ID: 1477062

Adams Grove is an unincorporated community in western Southampton County, Virginia, United States, off Route 615. It lies at an elevation of 89 feet (27 m). Its ZIP code is 23844.

The Norfolk, Franklin and Danville Railway runs through the hamlet.
