= Battle of Blackstock's Farm =

Coordinates: 34°40′45.48″N 81°48′44.64″W

- Part of the American Revolutionary War
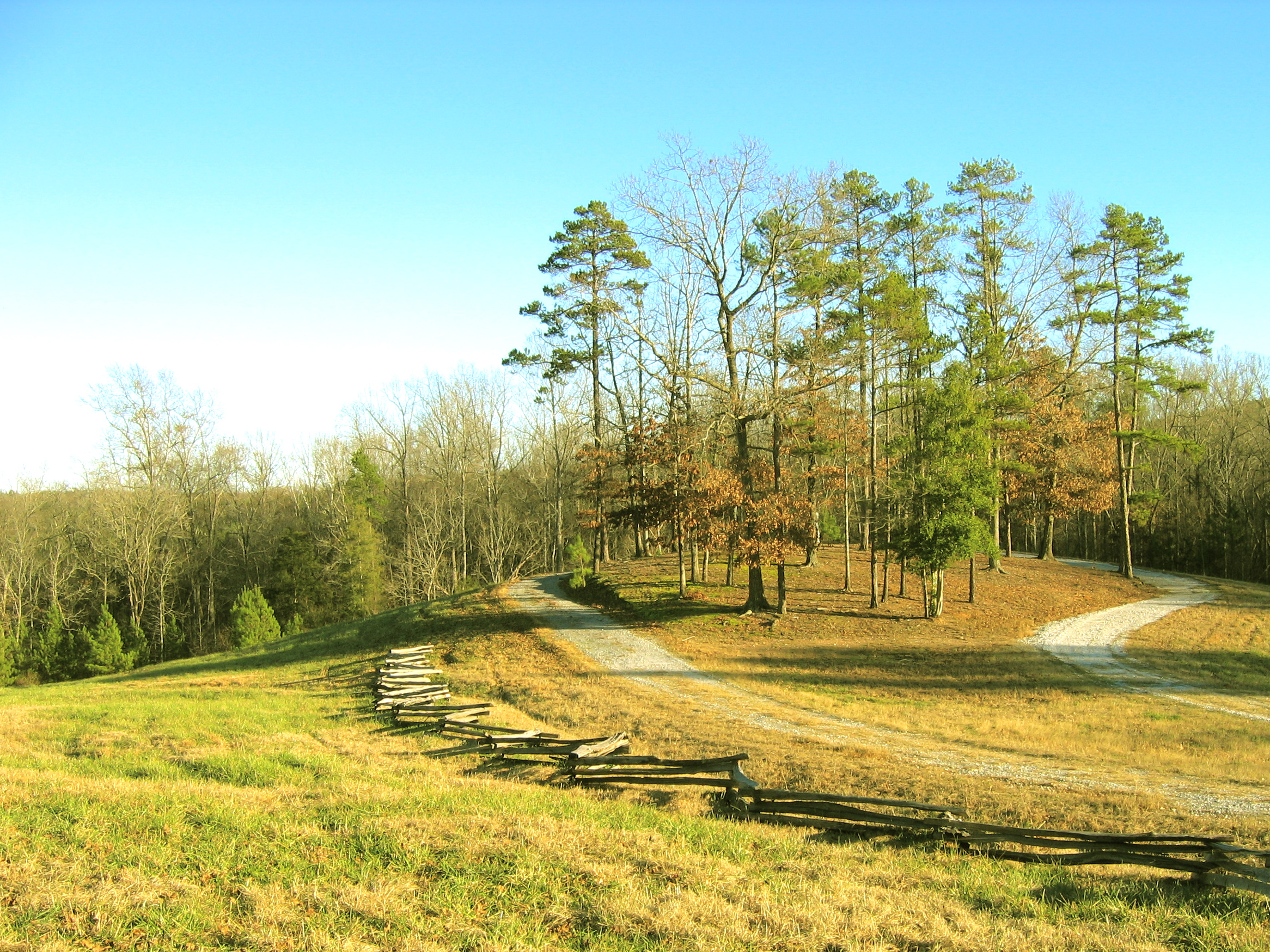
- Blackstock Battlefield site
Date	November 20, 1780
Location	Union County, near Cross Anchor, South Carolina
Result	American victory

Belligerents
Great Britain: (Kingdom of Great Britain) Loyalists	United States

Commanders and leaders
(Kingdom of Great Britain) Banastre Tarleton	(United States) Thomas Sumter (WIA)

Strength
270 regulars and militia	1,000 militia

Casualties and losses
51–167 killed and wounded	Total Losses: 57; 3 killed; 4 wounded; 50 captured

- Battle of Blackstock's Historic Site
- U.S. National Register of Historic Places
- Location: West of Union off South Carolina Highway 49, near Union, South Carolina
- Area: 540 acres (220 ha)
- Built: 1780
- NRHP reference No.: 74001885
- Added to NRHP: December 16, 1974

The Battle of Blackstock's Farm, also called Blackstock's Plantation, Blackstock's Hill, and Blackstocks, a military engagement of the American Revolutionary War, took place in what today is Union County, South Carolina, a few miles from Cross Anchor, on November 20, 1780.

The battle marked the first time during the war that an American militia had defeated British regulars, although they outnumbered British troops three to one and fought from a prepared position rather than in the field.

== Background ==
After the defeat of Major Patrick Ferguson and the destruction or capture of his entire military force of 900 men at the Battle of Kings Mountain the previous month, the sparsely settled Carolina Backcountry had come increasingly under the control of the Patriots.

Lieutenant General Charles Cornwallis, British commander in the Southern theater, ordered Lieutenant Colonel Banastre Tarleton and his British Legion to abandon the chase of the guerrilla commander Brigadier General Francis Marion and instead disrupt the activities of Patriot militia Brigadier General Thomas Sumter, thereby returning confidence to Backcountry Tories. Meanwhile, Sumter had been gathering partisan volunteers and now had a thousand men under his command.

== Preliminaries ==
On November 18, Tarleton's British Legion dragoons and the mounted infantry of the 63d Regiment were bathing and watering their horses on the Broad River when some of Sumter's raiders fired at them from the opposite bank. The British brought up a 3-pounder "grasshopper" field gun and easily scattered the partisans. Putting his men across the river in flat boats that night, he pressed Sumter hard the next day. Tarleton's advance guard caught up to Sumter's force the next evening, forcing them to make a stand. Fortunately for Sumter, a deserter from the 63d Regiment had revealed Tarleton's plans and location.

Although Sumter now had a thousand Backcountry militiamen, Tarleton had more than five hundred troops under his command, including three hundred regulars. Sumter and his colonels decided the best course was to find a strong defensive position and wait for Tarleton to attack them. Colonel Thomas Brandon, who knew the area, suggested the nearby farm of William Blackstock, a homestead on the hills above the Tyger River. The land had been cleared, providing fields of fire and room for maneuver, and the outbuildings—solid log structures made of hardwood—were not chinked and thus provided "narrow but convenient openings for men firing from behind cover." Tarleton's troops would have to advance in the open over fences and a creek to engage Sumter's defensive positions.

== Battle ==
Sumter placed Colonel Henry Hampton and his South Carolina riflemen in the farm outbuildings. Some units he stationed behind stout fences and others he screened in the surrounding woods. Tarleton came up late in the fall afternoon and chose to make a frontal attack against a numerically superior force, not waiting for his infantry and artillery to catch up. At first he was successful. The Patriot militia fired at too great a distance, and before they could reload Major John Money, commanding the 63d Regiment, hit them with the bayonet. Nevertheless, in doing so, the 63d advanced too close to the farm buildings and came under fire from Hampton's men inside. Money and two of his lieutenants were killed, and perhaps a third of the privates as well. Meanwhile, other partisans worked their way around their right flank and attacked Tarleton's dragoons who were in their saddles but only watching the action.

With their comrades under pressure, Tarleton and his men ignored the danger from riflemen firing from well-protected positions. They charged uphill to rescue the 63rd, but many dragoons and horses were wounded in the attempt. At great risk, Tarleton personally dismounted and carried the badly wounded Major Money to safety. As the wounded tried to struggle to safety, Patriots continued shooting the helpless men. Yet, even then, British forces fell back in good order.

When Sumter, as "reckless as Tarleton", moved into position to watch the British withdrawal, members of the 63d fired a volley at him and his officers. Sumter was severely wounded and had to relinquish command to his senior colonel, John Twiggs.

Tarleton retreated two miles to await reinforcements for another attack the next morning. But Twiggs left camp fires burning and disappeared into the night. The next morning Tarleton's troops buried the dead of both sides. Tarleton reported 51 of his men were killed or wounded. A contemporary American account claimed greater British casualties: 92 killed and 75-100 wounded. American casualties were 3 killed, 4 wounded, and 50 captured.

== Aftermath ==
Tarleton reported to Cornwallis that he had broken and dispersed the Americans and seriously wounded Sumpter. He said three of his soldiers had "promised to fix Sumter immediately," for which he had promised them fifty guineas apiece.

Though Tarleton held the field, the British Legion, that is British regulars, had been halted by militia, although from behind cover rather than in open battle. Even the wounding of Sumter may have been an advantage to the Patriots because it allowed George Washington to appoint Nathanael Greene to command the Southern department.

The Battle of Blackstock's Historic Site was added to the National Register of Historic Places in 1974.

== Sources ==
- Crawford, Alan Pell. 2024. This Fierce People: The Untold Story of America’s Revolutionary War in the South. Alfred A. Knopf, New York. ISBN 978-0-593-31850-8
- O'Kelley, Patrick (2004). Nothing but Blood and Slaughter: The Revolutionary War in the Carolinas. Volume Two: 1780. Blue House Tavern Press. ISBN 1-59113-588-5.
- Tarleton, Banastre (2003) [1787]. "The Campaigns of 1780 and 1781". www.banastretarleton.org. Archived from the original on 2009-01-29.
