= Oakland Plantation House (Mount Pleasant, South Carolina) =

Historic house in South Carolina, United States

- U.S. National Register of Historic Places
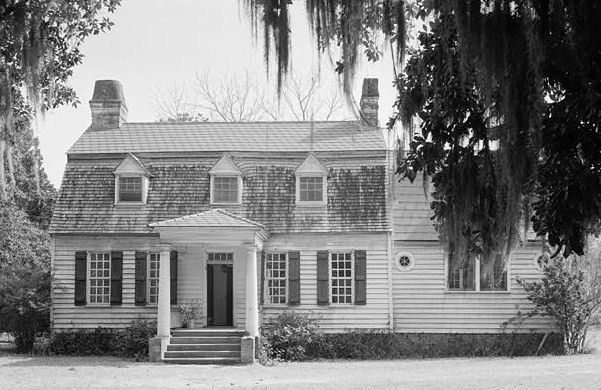
- Oakland Plantation in 1940

- Location within South Carolina Location within the United States
- Nearest city: Mount Pleasant, South Carolina
- Coordinates: 32°51′45″N 79°46′54″W
- Built: c. 1750
- NRHP reference No.: 77001218
- Added to NRHP: July 13, 1977

The Oakland Plantation House which is also known as Youghall or Youghal Plantation House, was built about 1750 in Charleston County, South Carolina about 7 mi (11 km) east of Mount Pleasant. It is located about 1 mile (1.6 km) south of U.S. Route 17 on Stratton Place. It was named to the National Register of Historic Places on July 13, 1977.

== History ==
John Perrie, who came from Ireland, acquired 982 acres (397 ha) in Christ Church Parish. He named the plantation after Youghal in County Cork. At his death in 1713, the plantation passed on to his daughter. Her husband conveyed the property to Captain George Benison in 1740. It is believed that he built the house. In 1755, Charles Barksdale acquired the plantation. The Barksdale family controlled the property for the next century.

In the 1850s, Mary Barksdale and her husband, James McBeth were the owners. McBeth was probably responsible for the name change to Oakland. In 1859, Philip E. Porcher bought the property. His descendants have owned it since.

Since 2009, the East Cooper Land Trust has protected about 133 acres (54 ha) of natural habitat that has been set aside under a conservation easement. Additionally, a portion of the land has been converted to commercial development.

== Architecture ==
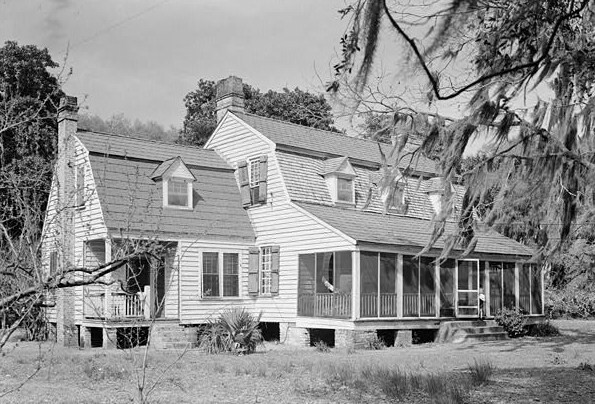
Rear elevation of Oakland Plantation in 1940

The plantation house is a 1 1/2-story frame house with gambrel roof. The top one and one-half stories are frame construction on brick piers. It originally had chimneys on either end, but only one remains. Five steps lead up to a portico with a hip roof supported by two Tuscan columns that were added at a later date. It has a paneled door in the center of front facade with a four-light flush transom. Two nine-over-nine windows are on each side of the door.

A kitchen wing was added to the structure in the 1920s with a similar gambrel roof. The wing also has a circular window, double casements on the front, and doors connecting with the house windows. The rear elevation is similar to the front elevation except that it has a shed-roof porch supported by square stucco columns. The wooden floor of the porch has been replaced by a ground-level concrete patio.

The left side elevation has three nine-over-nine lights on each level and the central windows replace the chimney that was removed. The interior has four rooms without a central hallway. The door opens to a small foyer with staircase. The second floor has three bedrooms and a bath. The fireplaces with original Greek-motif mantels are in the corners of the room.

The original, detached kitchen, two smokehouses, and an oak-lined avenue remain.
