= Battle of Brandywine order of battle =

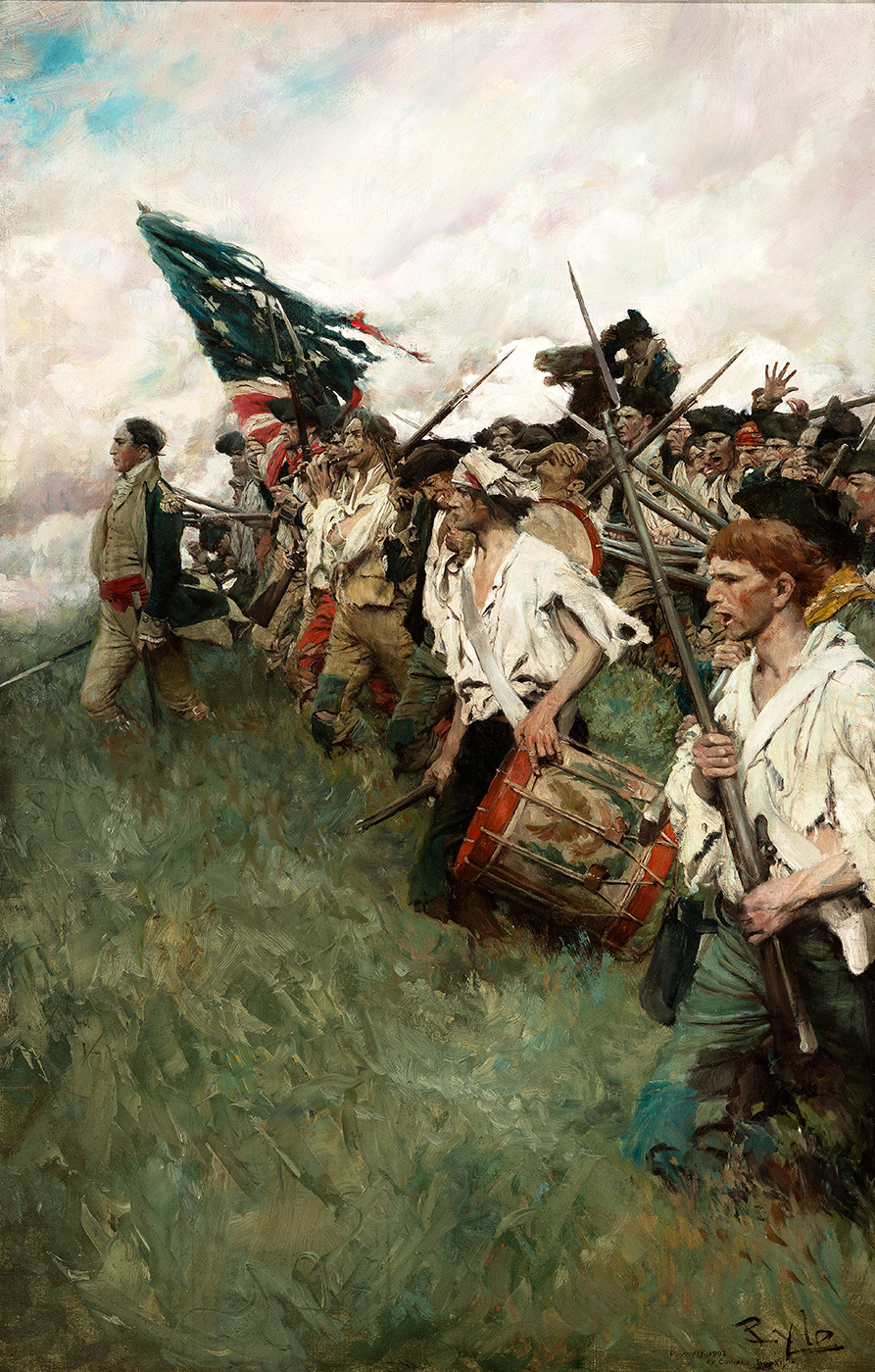
Nation Makers by Howard Pyle depicts the Battle of Brandywine.

At the Battle of Brandywine of September 11, 1777, an American army led by General George Washington fought a British-Hessian army commanded by General William Howe, 5th Viscount Howe. Washington drew up his troops in a defensive position behind Brandywine Creek. Howe sent Lieutenant General Wilhelm von Knyphausen's 5,000 troops to demonstrate against the American front at Chadd's Ford. Meanwhile, Lieutenant General Charles Cornwallis took 10,000 troops on a wide flank march that crossed the creek and got in the rear of the American right wing commanded by Major General John Sullivan. The Americans changed front but Howe's attack broke through.

As Howe's wing made progress, Knyphausen converted his feint into a frontal attack on the American center. Washington's army was driven to the rear in disarray, but was saved from rout by Major General Nathanael Greene's rear guard action. Washington's army retreated to Chester, Pennsylvania while Howe occupied Wilmington, Delaware. The engagement took place in Chadds Ford Township, Delaware County, Pennsylvania.

== British Army order of battle ==
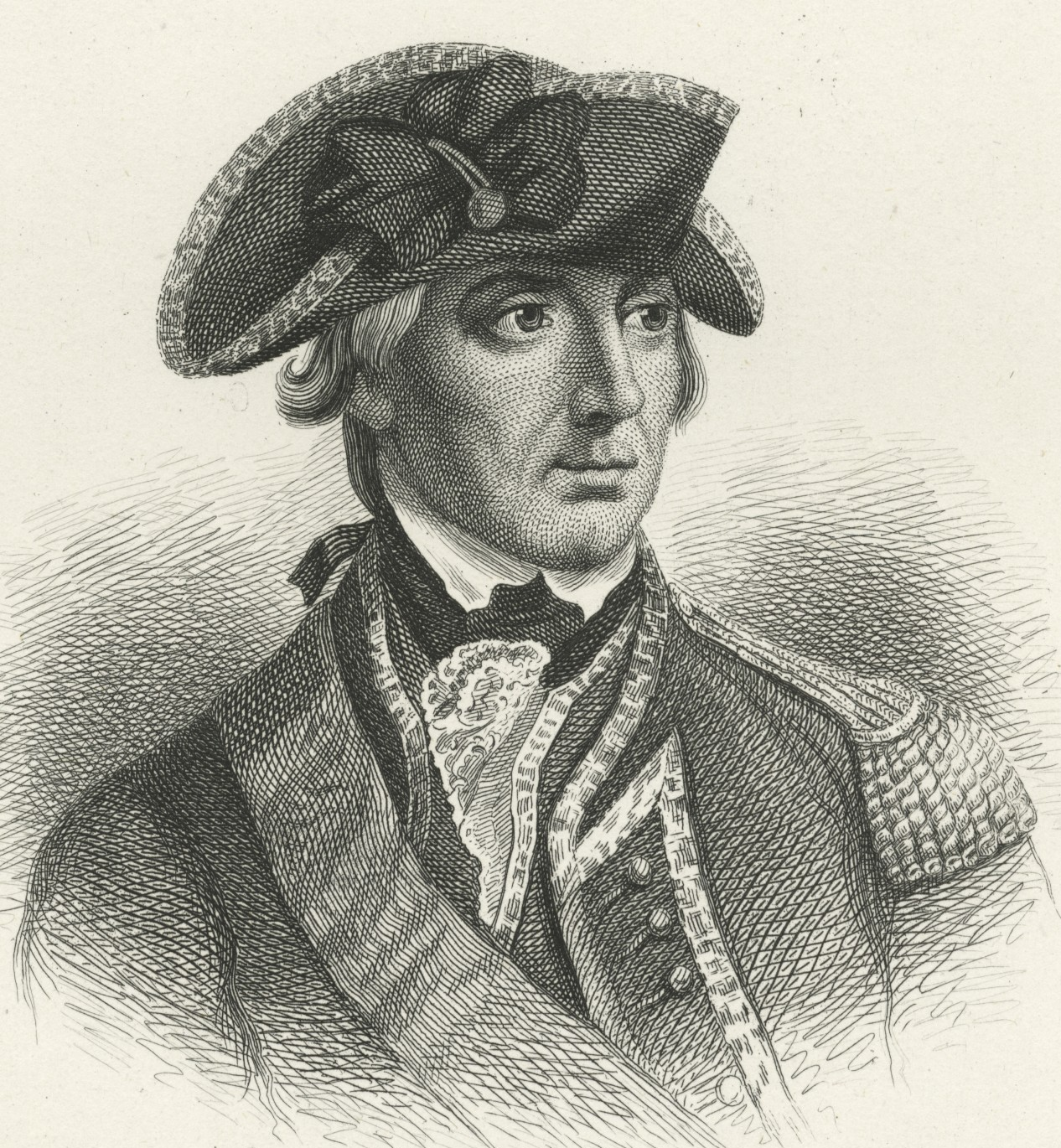
Sir William Howe

General Sir William Howe (18,000)
Quartermaster General: Brigadier General Sir William Erskine, 1st Baronet

Note: Each brigade had two or four 3-pound or 4-pound cannons attached.

=== Left Wing ===
Lieutenant General Lord Cornwallis

- Unbrigaded:
  - 16th Light Dragoons (200)
  - Hessian and Anspach Jägers: Lieutenant Colonel Ludwig von Wurmb (500)
  - Mounted Jäger company, Captain Richard Lorey (100)
  - Artillery: 3rd Brigade
    - Four 12-pound cannons & six 6-pound cannons

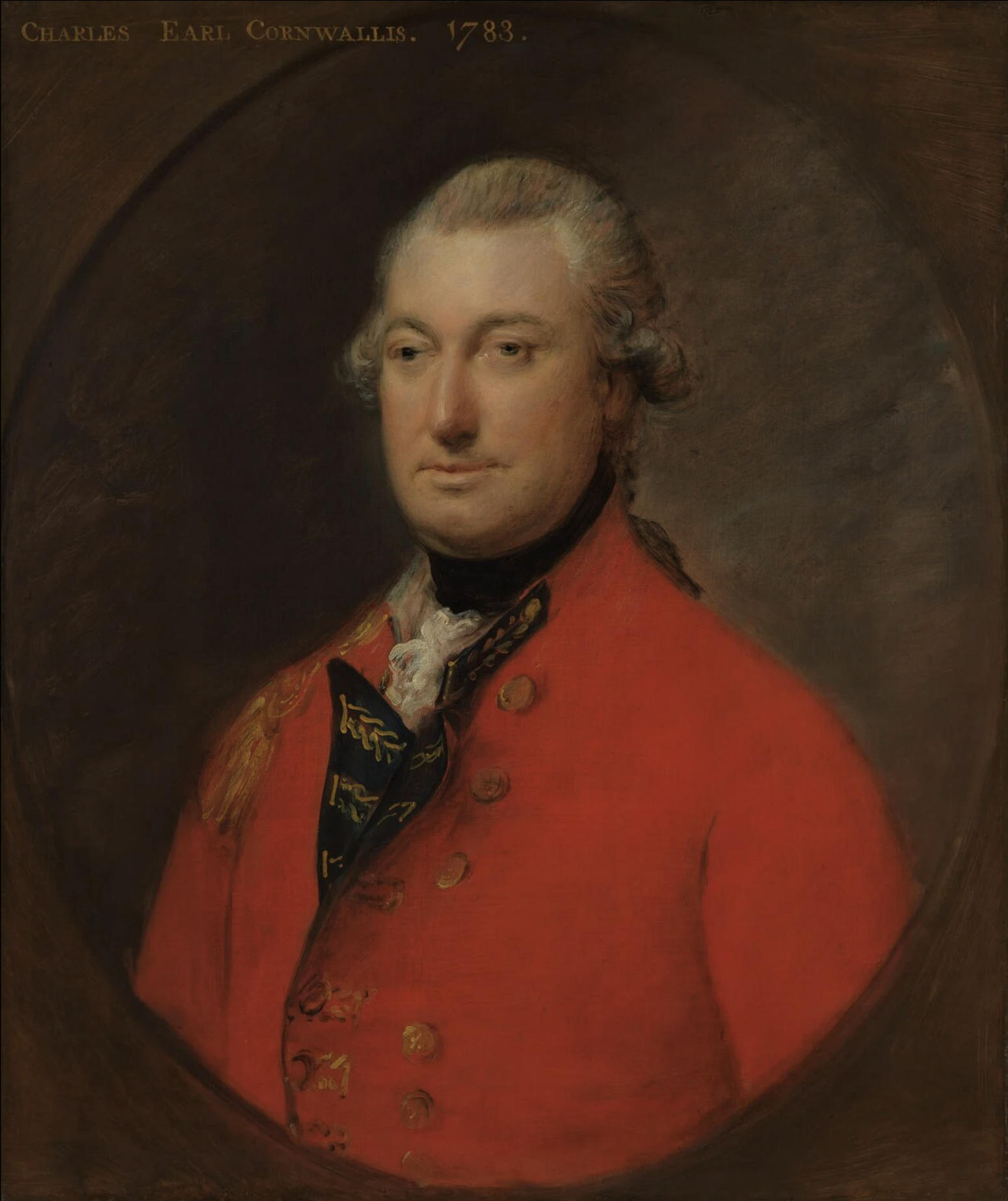
Lord Cornwallis

- Guards Brigade: Brigadier General Edward Mathew (939)
  - Elements of 1st Foot Guard, 2nd Foot Guard, and 3rd Foot Guard Regiments
  - 1st Battalion (488)
    - Grenadier company, Lieutenant Colonel Sir George Osborn, 4th Baronet (124)
    - Hyde's company (93)
    - Wrottesley's company (91)
    - Cox's company (90)
    - Garth's company (90)
  - 2nd Battalion (451)
    - Stephen's company (88)
    - Murray's company (89)
    - O'Hara's company (87)
    - Martin's company (91)
    - Light company, Lieutenant Colonel Osborn (96)

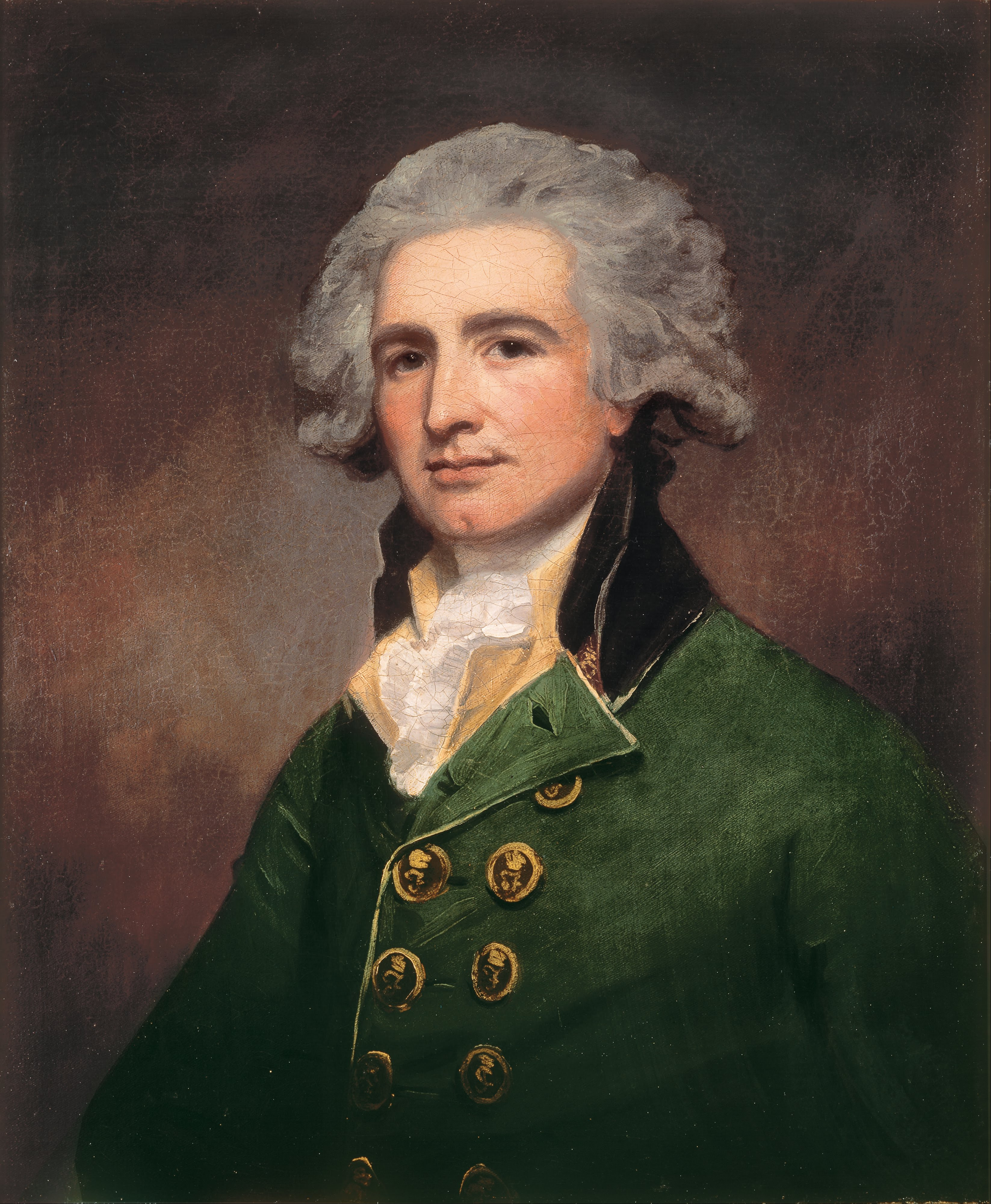
Robert Abercromby

- Light Infantry: (1,300)
  - 1st Light Infantry Battalion, Lieutenant Colonel Robert Abercromby of Airthrey
    - Light companies of (from left to right in formation) 5th, 15th, 22nd, 27th, 33rd, 38th, 42nd, 35th, 28th, 23rd, 17th, 10th, and 4th Regiments.
  - 2nd Light Infantry Battalion, Major John Maitland
    - Light companies of (from left to right in formation) 37th, 43rd, 45th, 49th, 55th, 63rd, 71st, 64th, 57th, 52nd, 46th, 44th, and 40th Regiments.
- Grenadiers: (1,400)
  - 1st Grenadier Battalion, Lieutenant Colonel William Medows
    - Grenadier companies of (from left to right in formation) 5th, 15th, 22nd, 27th, 33rd, 37th, 40th, 38th, 35th, 28th, 23rd, 17th, 10th, and 4th Regiments
  - 2nd Grenadier Battalion, Lieutenant Colonel Henry Monckton
    - Grenadier companies of (from left to right in formation) 43rd, 49th, 52nd, 57th, 64th, 71st, 63rd, 55th, Marines, 46th, 44th, and 42nd Regiments

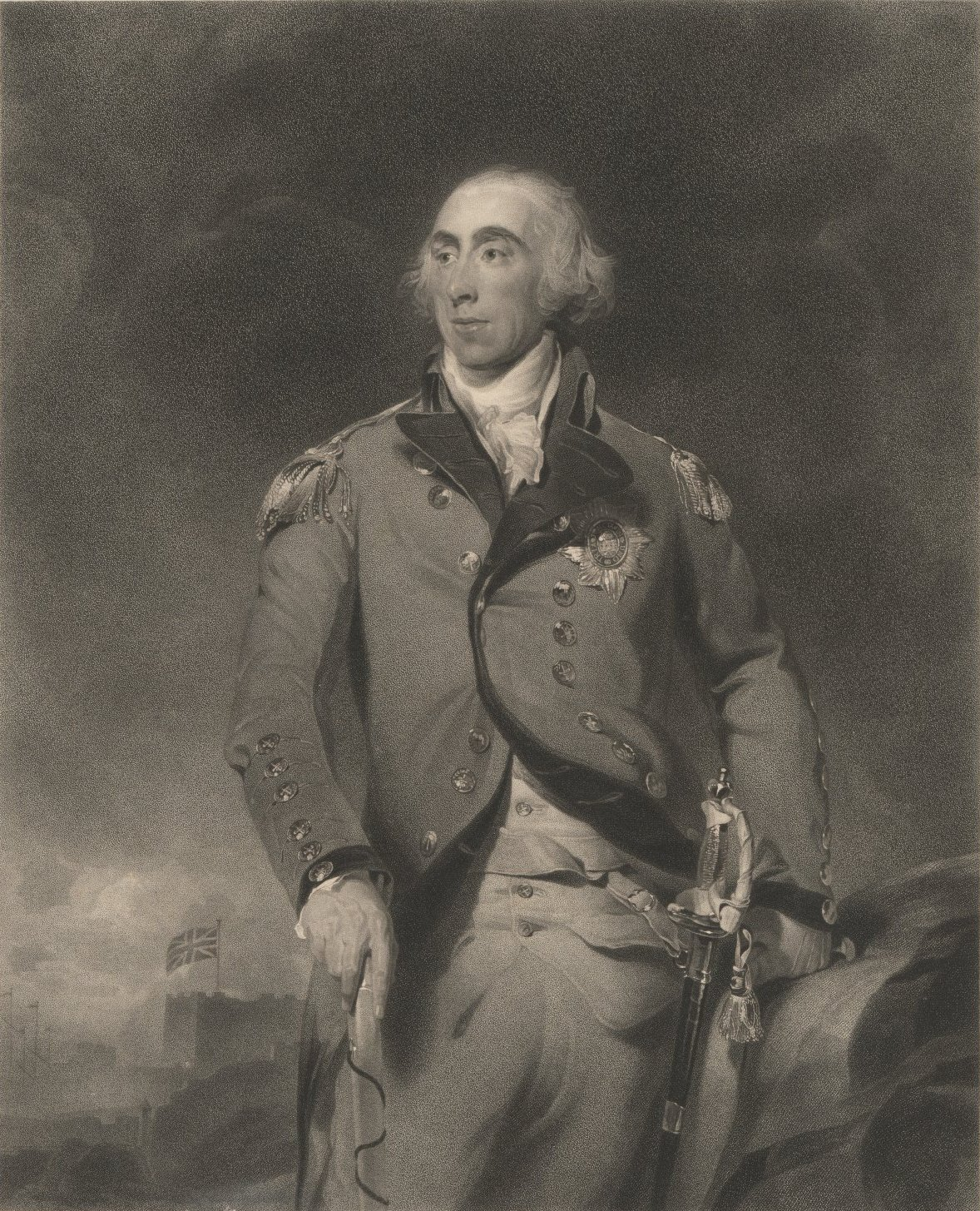
Charles Grey

- 3rd Brigade: Major General Charles Grey, 1st Earl Grey (3,000 in 3rd and 4th Brigades)
  - 15th Foot
  - 17th Foot
  - 42nd Foot
  - 44th Foot
- 4th Brigade: Brigadier General James Agnew
  - 33rd Foot
  - 38th Foot
  - 46th Foot
  - 64th Foot
- Hessian Brigade: Colonel Carl von Donop (1,300)
  - Linsing Grenadier Battalion
  - Minningerode Grenadier Battalion
  - Lengerke Grenadier Battalion

=== Right Wing ===
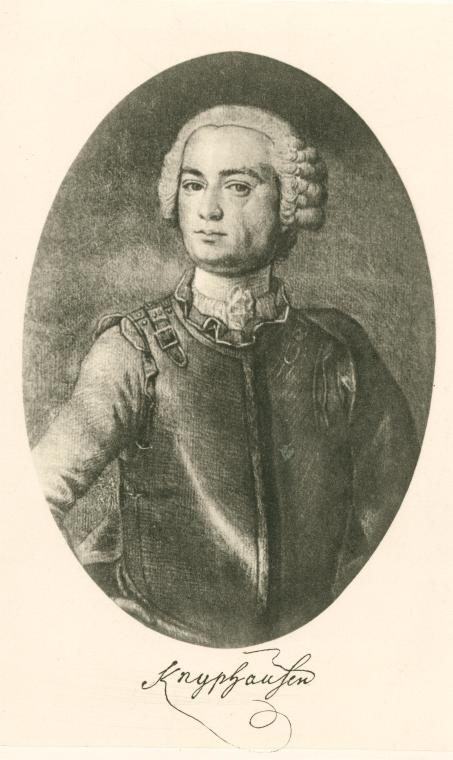
Wilhelm Knyphausen

Lieutenant General Wilhelm von Knyphausen

- Unbrigaded:
  - Queen's Rangers, Captain James Weymss (300)
  - Ferguson's Corps of Riflemen, Captain Patrick Ferguson (90)
  - 16th Light Dragoons (200)
  - 71st Foot (1,200)
    - 1st and 3rd battalions guarding the baggage train.
    - 2nd battalion (350)
  - Artillery: 1st and 2nd Brigades
    - Six 12-pound cannons & four howitzers
- Hessian Brigade: Major General Johann Daniel Stirn (2,000)
  - Erbprinz Infantry Regiment
  - Donop Infantry Regiment
  - Mirbach Infantry Regiment
- 1st Brigade: Major General James Grant (1,400)
  - 4th Foot
  - 23rd Foot
  - 28th Foot
  - 49th Foot
- 2nd Brigade: Major General Grant (1,300)
  - 5th Foot
  - 10th Foot
  - 27th Foot
  - 40th Foot, Lieutenant Colonel Thomas Musgrave, John Graves Simcoe
  - 55th Foot

== American Army order of battle ==
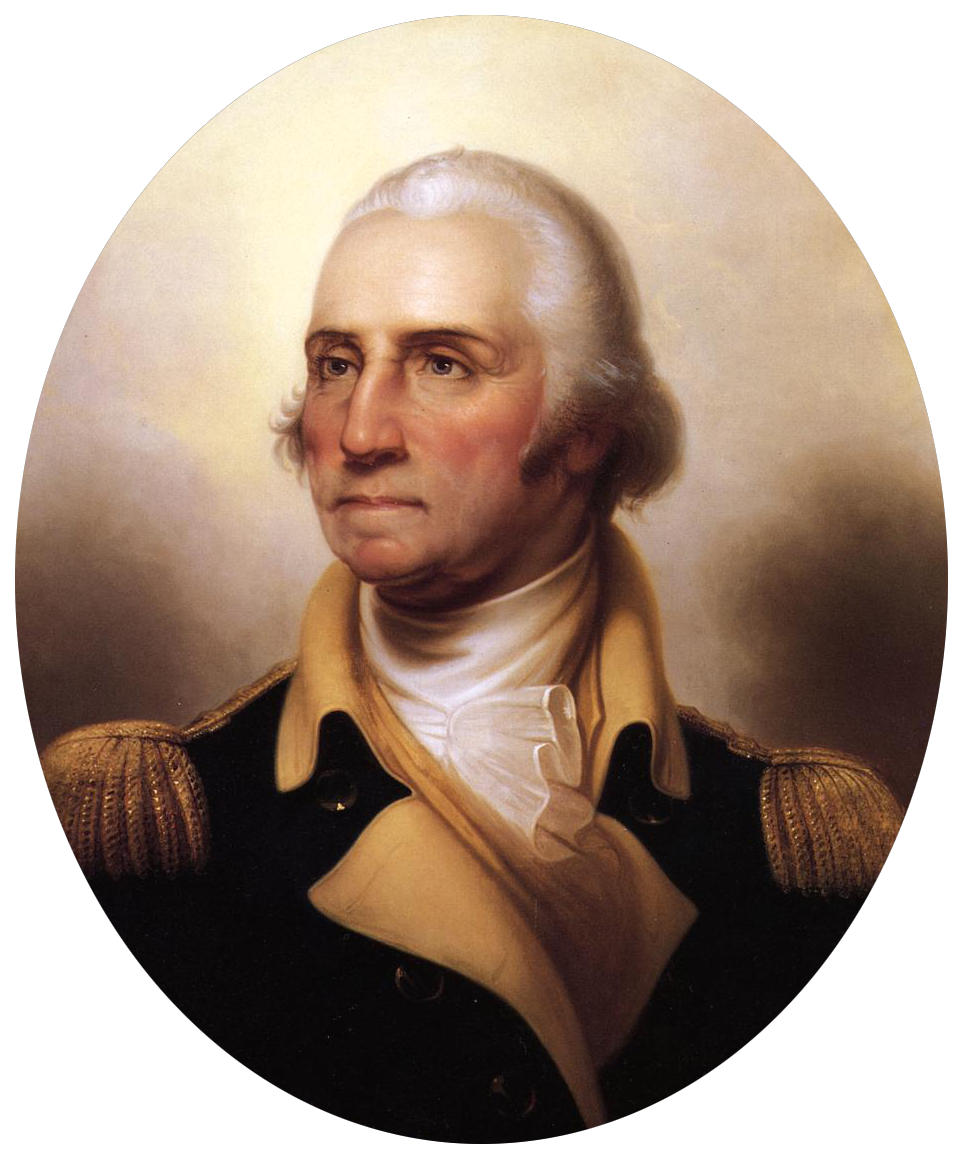
George Washington

General and Commander in Chief George Washington (12,000 regulars, 3,000 militia)

=== Main Body ===
- Unattached:
  - Chadds Ford redoubt: Colonel Thomas Proctor
    - 4th Continental Artillery Regiment: One 6-pound gun, two 4-pound guns, one 8-inch howitzer
  - Light Infantry Corps: Brigadier General William Maxwell (1,000)
    - About 100 soldiers were detached from each regular brigade to form this corps
  - North Carolina Brigade: Brigadier General Francis Nash (1,094)
    - 1st North Carolina Regiment, Colonel Thomas Clark
    - 2nd North Carolina Regiment, Colonel Alexander Martin
    - 3rd North Carolina Regiment, Colonel Jethro Sumner
    - 4th North Carolina Regiment, Colonel Thomas Polk
    - 5th North Carolina Regiment Colonel Edward Buncombe
    - 6th North Carolina Regiment, Colonel Gideon Lamb
    - 7th North Carolina Regiment, Colonel James Hogun
    - 8th North Carolina Regiment
    - 9th North Carolina Regiment
- Division: Major General John Armstrong Sr. (2,000)
  - 1st Pennsylvania Militia Brigade: Brigadier General James Potter
    - Philadelphia County Regiment, Moor
    - Philadelphia County Regiment, McVaugh
    - Bucks County Regiment, Maj. John Folwell
    - Lancaster County Regiment, Col. James Watson
    - Berks County Regiment, Col. Daniel Hunter
    - York County Regiment, Col. James Thompson
    - Cumberland County Regiment, Col. James Dunlap
  - Pennsylvania Militia Brigade: Brigadier General James Irvine
    - Philadelphia County Regiment, Lt. Col. Jonathan Smith
    - Chester County Regiment, Col. William Evans
    - Lancaster County Regiment, Col. Philip Greenwalt
    - Lancaster County Regiment, Col. Alexander Lowry
    - Northampton County Regiment, Col. David Udree

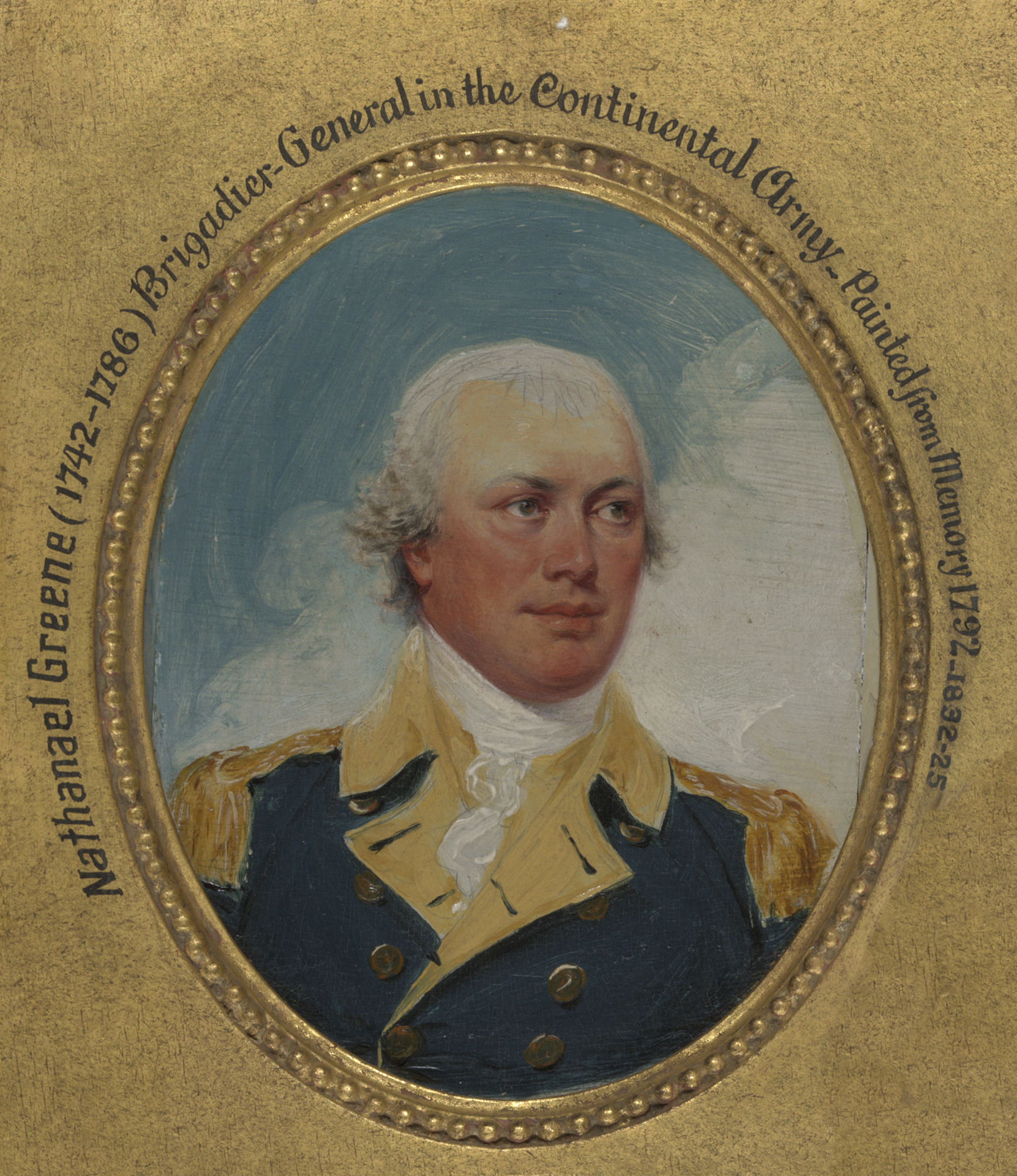
Nathanael Greene

- Division: Major General Nathanael Greene (2,500)
  - 1st Virginia Brigade: Brigadier General Peter Muhlenberg
    - 1st Virginia Regiment
    - 5th Virginia Regiment, Lt. Col. Josiah Parker
    - 9th Virginia Regiment, Colonel George Mathews
    - 13th Virginia Regiment
    - German Battalion
  - 2nd Virginia Brigade: Brigadier General George Weedon
    - 2nd Virginia Regiment
    - 6th Virginia Regiment
    - 10th Virginia Regiment
    - 14th Virginia Regiment
    - Pennsylvania State Regiment, Colonel Walter Stewart

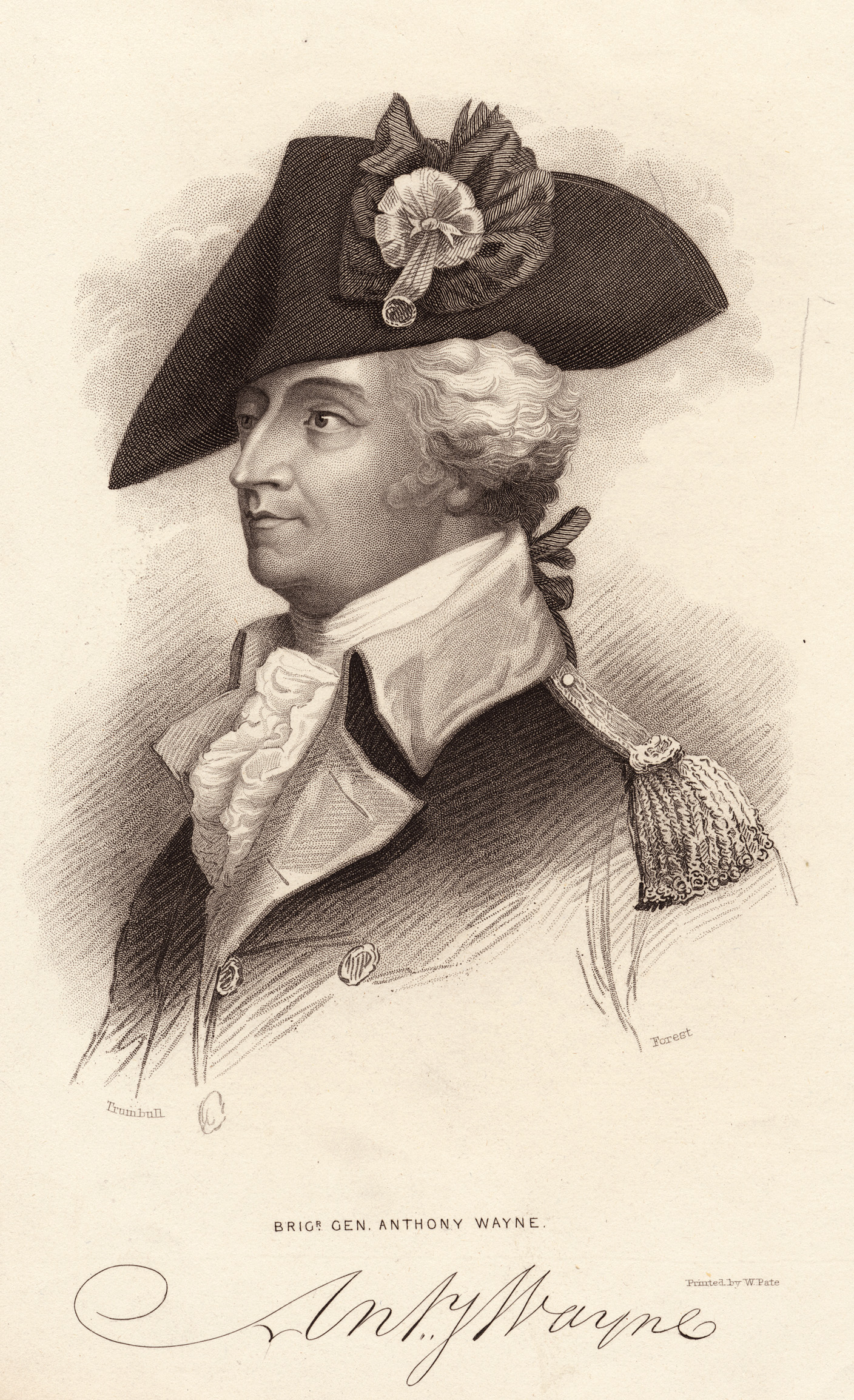
Anthony Wayne

- Division: Brigadier General Anthony Wayne (2,000)
  - 1st Pennsylvania Brigade: Colonel Thomas Hartley
    - 1st Pennsylvania Regiment, Colonel James Chambers
    - 2nd Pennsylvania Regiment, Major William Williams
    - 7th Pennsylvania Regiment
    - 10th Pennsylvania Regiment, Lieutenant Colonel Adam Hubley
    - Hartley's Additional Continental Regiment, Lieutenant Colonel Morgan Connor
  - 2nd Pennsylvania Brigade: Colonel Richard Humpton
    - 4th Pennsylvania Regiment
    - 5th Pennsylvania Regiment, Colonel Francis Johnston
    - 8th Pennsylvania Regiment
    - 11th Pennsylvania Regiment, Colonel Richard Humpton

=== Sullivan's Wing ===
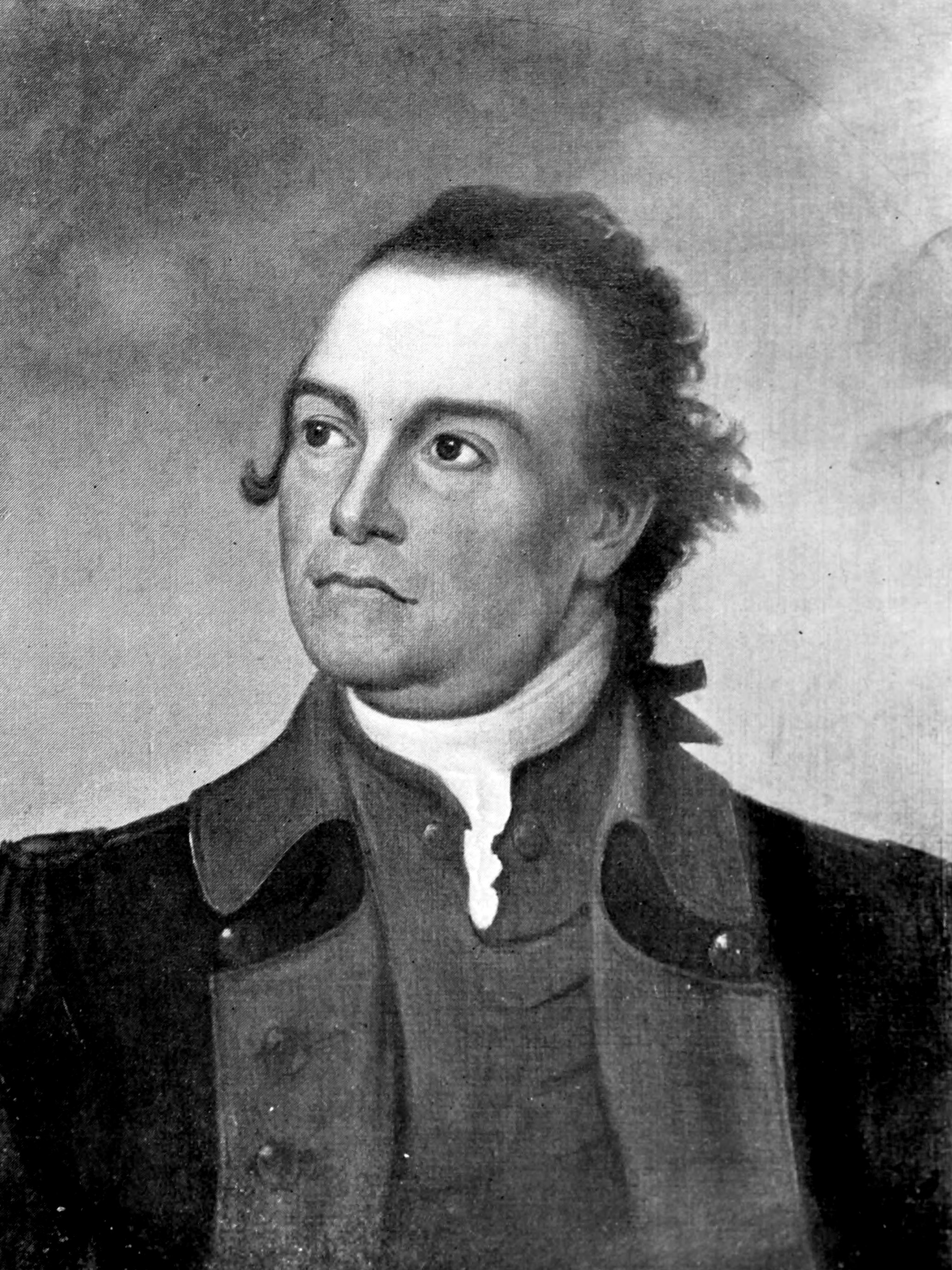
John Sullivan

- Division: Major General John Sullivan (1,100 less 1st Delaware & 2nd Canadian)
  - 1st Maryland Brigade: Unknown commander (William Smallwood's brigade)
    - 1st Maryland Regiment
    - 3rd Maryland Regiment
    - 7th Maryland Regiment
    - 1st Delaware Regiment, Colonel David Hall (250)
  - 2nd Maryland Brigade: Brigadier General Chevalier Philippe Hubert Preudhomme de Borre
    - 2nd Maryland Regiment
    - 4th Maryland Regiment, Colonel Josias Carvil Hall
    - 6th Maryland Regiment
    - 2nd Canadian Regiment, Colonel Moses Hazen (400)

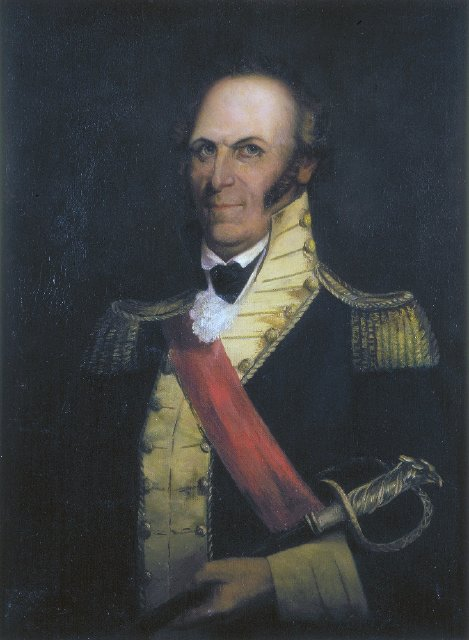
Charles Scott

- Division: Major General Adam Stephen (1,500)
  - 3rd Virginia Brigade: Brigadier General William Woodford
    - 3rd Virginia Regiment
    - 7th Virginia Regiment
    - 11th Virginia Regiment
    - 15th Virginia Regiment
  - 4th Virginia Brigade: Brigadier General Charles Scott
    - 4th Virginia Regiment
    - 8th Virginia Regiment
    - 12th Virginia Regiment
    - Grayson's Additional Continental Regiment
    - Patton's Additional Continental Regiment

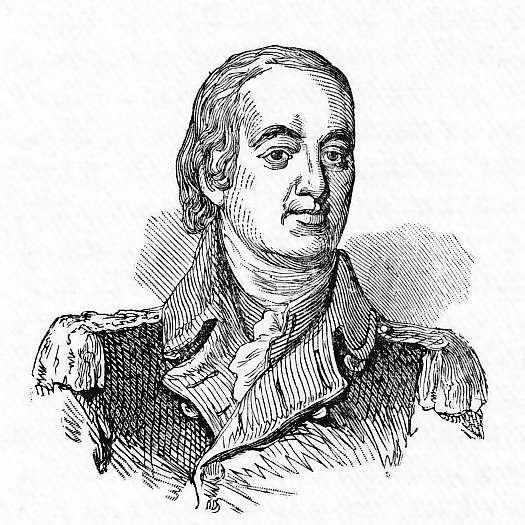
Lord Stirling

- Division: Major General William Alexander, Lord Stirling (1,500)
  - New Jersey Brigade: Brigadier General William Maxwell (Note: Maxwell led the Light Infantry Corps and the sources did not list who led the New Jersey Brigade.)
    - 1st New Jersey Regiment, Colonel Matthias Ogden
    - 2nd New Jersey Regiment
    - 3rd New Jersey Regiment, Colonel Elias Dayton
    - 4th New Jersey Regiment
  - 3rd Pennsylvania Brigade: Brigadier General Thomas Conway
    - 3rd Pennsylvania Regiment
    - 6th Pennsylvania Regiment
    - 9th Pennsylvania Regiment
    - 12th Pennsylvania Regiment
    - Spencer's Additional Continental Regiment

== Notes ==
Footnotes

Citations
