= Richard Parker (colonel) =

American colonel

- Born: 1751; Virginia
- Died: 8 May 1780 (aged 28–29); Charleston, South Carolina
- Military career
- Allegiance: United States
- Branch: Infantry
- Service years: 1775–1780
- Rank: Colonel
- Conflicts: Battle of Great Bridge (1775); Burning of Norfolk (1776); Battle of Trenton (1776); Battle of Assunpink Creek (1777); Battle of Princeton (1777); Battle of Brandywine (1777); Battle of Monmouth (1778); Siege of Charleston (1780)

Richard Parker (1751 – 8 May 1780) was an American colonel who fought in the American Revolutionary War. Son of prominent Virginia jurist Richard Parker, Parker received an officer's commission in a Virginia regiment early in the conflict. He probably was present at Great Bridge and Norfolk. Promoted to major, he fought at Trenton in December 1776 and commanded the regiment at Second Trenton and Princeton in January 1777. At Brandywine in September 1777 he led a detachment of light infantry in delaying the British. The next month he fought at Germantown. Promoted to colonel at Valley Forge, he led a picked detachment at Monmouth in June 1778. In May 1779, George Washington ordered him back to Virginia to recruit a new regiment. After being sent south with a new unit of reinforcements for Charleston, South Carolina in late 1779, he died of wounds received at the Siege of Charleston in 1780.

== Great Bridge to Valley Forge ==
Born in 1751, Richard Parker (1729–1815) was the son of Judge Richard Parker and Elizabeth Beale (d. 1778). His brothers were John (d. 1810), Alexander (1752–1820), William Harwar (1753–1815), and Thomas (1755–1820). The younger Richard Parker married Elelina Moss. He was appointed captain in the 2nd Virginia Regiment on 28 September 1775. The commander of this unit, William Woodford led his troops at the Battle of Great Bridge on 9 December 1775 and at Norfolk on 1 January 1776.

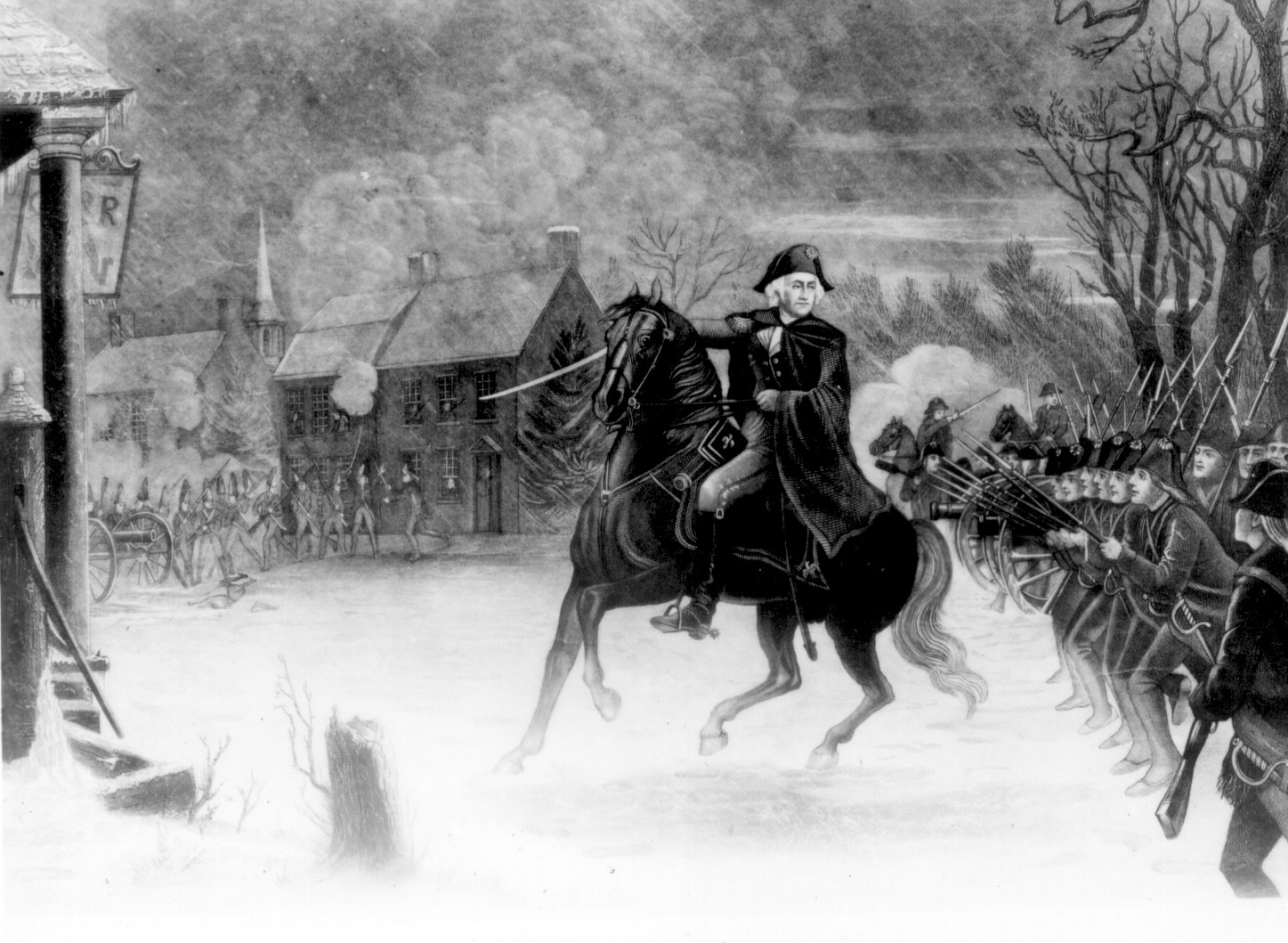
Battle of Trenton

On 13 August 1776, Parker became a major in the 6th Virginia Regiment. This regiment was transferred to Adam Stephen's brigade in George Washington's main army on 3 September 1776. The 6th Virginia, only 191 men strong, under Colonel Mordecai Buckner is noted in the order of battle for the Battle of Trenton on 26 December 1776. Major Parker is listed as acting commander of the 6th Virginia at the time of the battles of Assunpink Creek and Princeton on 2 and 3 January 1777.

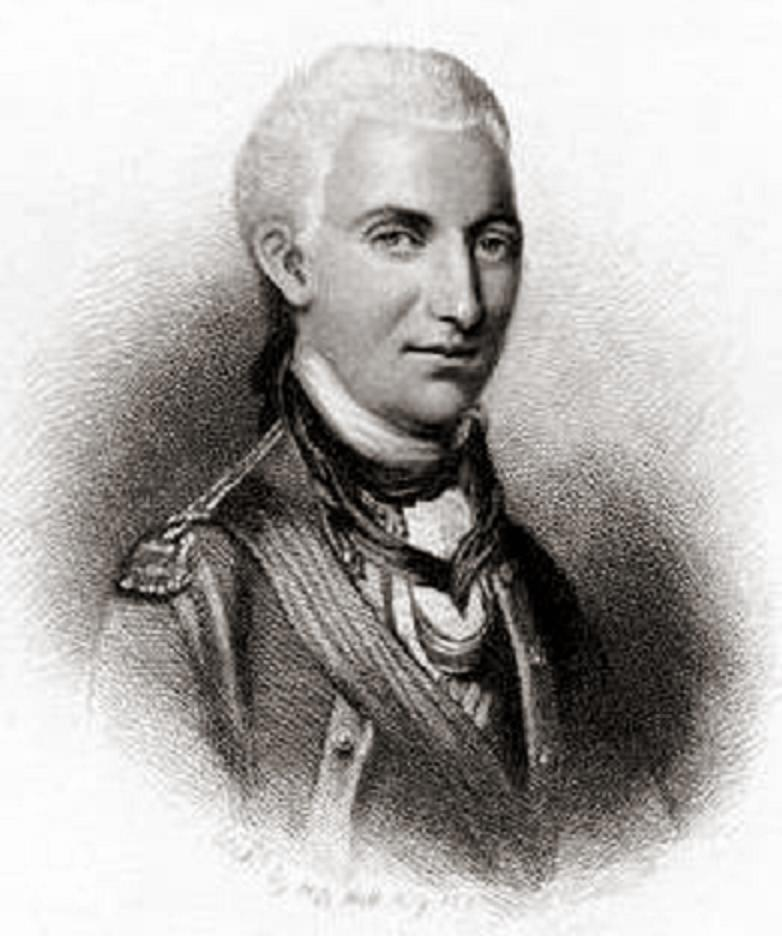
Christian Febiger led the 2nd Virginia at Valley Forge.

On 10 February 1777 Parker was promoted to lieutenant colonel in the 2nd Virginia Regiment. The regiment was involved in skirmishing in northern New Jersey through June 1777. At the Battle of Brandywine on 11 September 1777, William Maxwell led a force of light infantry to delay the British advance toward Chadds Ford. Maxwell deployed detachments under Lieutenant Colonels Parker, William Heth of the 3rd Virginia Regiment, and Charles Simms of the 12th Virginia Regiment, and Captain Charles Porterfield of the 11th Virginia Regiment. Beginning at 6:00 AM, the light infantry fought a delaying action against Patrick Ferguson's riflemen and the Queen's Rangers. According to Ferguson's account, the latter unit suffered casualties of one man in four.

During the Philadelphia Campaign, the 2nd Virginia was assigned to the 2nd Virginia Brigade which was commanded by George Weedon. The brigade was part of Nathanael Greene's division at the Battle of Germantown on 4 October 1777. Parts of Weedon's brigade penetrated as far as the Market House before being forced to retreat. At Valley Forge, the field officers of the 2nd Virginia were Colonel Christian Febiger, Lieutenant Colonel Parker, and Major Ralph Faulkner. Parker received promotion to colonel of the 1st Virginia Regiment on 10 February 1778. His field officers at the time were Lieutenant Colonel Robert Ballard and Major Edmund B. Dickinson.

== Monmouth to Charleston ==
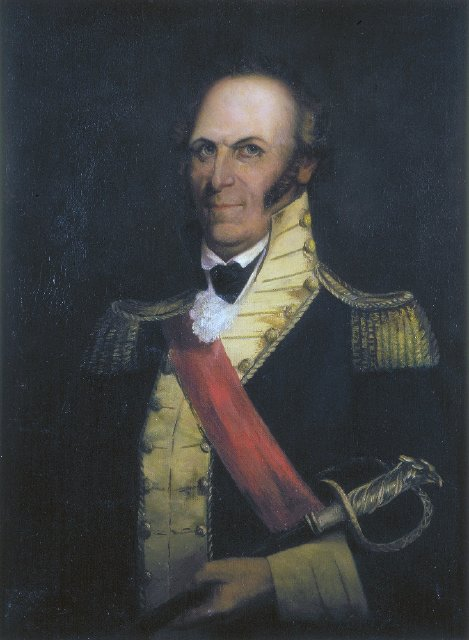
Charles Scott led four detachments at Monmouth, including Parker's.

Before the Battle of Monmouth on 28 June 1778, Parker commanded a battle group consisting of the consolidated 1st, 5th, and 9th Virginia Regiments in Peter Muhlenberg's brigade. However, shortly before the engagement, he was assigned to lead a picked detachment under Charles Scott in Charles Lee's Advance Guard. Scott's command also included three detachments under Richard Butler, Joseph Cilley, and Mordecai Gist. After a hesitant advance, Lee's troops began retreating after they were suddenly attacked by Sir Henry Clinton with as many as 10,000 troops. Parts of Lee's command put up a stout battle near a hedgerow before withdrawing to reorganize. The detachments of Parker and Cilley stayed behind to screen the left front of Washington's main body which was by then on the field.

Around 1:00 PM Clinton began a bombardment of the American position with two 12-pound cannons, six 6-pound guns, and two 5.5-inch howitzers. In response, 10 to 14 cannons replied under the direction of Washington's artillery chief Henry Knox and Edward Carrington of the 1st Continental Artillery Regiment. While the two-hour barrage continued, the British made an attempt to turn the American left flank. At 2:00 PM, the 1st Battalion of the 42nd Foot and the 44th Foot from Charles Grey's 3rd Brigade, the 1st Light Infantry Battalion and the Queen's Rangers under Sir William Erskine, and two 3-pound cannons crossed the Spottswood North Brook and jabbed ineffectually at the American lines. At 3:00 PM Erskine ordered a withdrawal, leaving some Highlanders holding an orchard. Washington sent Cilley's 350 men, followed by Parker's 250 troops to capture the position. Using a covered approach, the Americans got within 200 yards (183 m) of the orchard before being spotted. The 320 defenders belonged to the 2nd Battalion of the 42nd Foot of Grey's brigade. With the help of a 6-pound cannon that brought enfilading fire to bear, the American attack pushed the Highlanders back 300 yards (270 m). As the Americans emerged into the open, they came under fire from the two British 3-pound cannons. After an exchange of volleys, Cilley and Parker pulled their men back into the orchard. The British lost four killed and eight seriously wounded in the skirmish; American losses were probably somewhat more. Major Dickinson was killed in the battle.

In 1779 three provisional regiments from Virginia were raised as reinforcements for the Southern Department. On 7 May 1779, Washington sent Parker to Virginia to recruit troops to reinforce Benjamin Lincoln's southern army. William Davies took over as colonel of the 1st Virginia. In October 1779, Parker left Petersburg, Virginia with the first group of reinforcements. They arrived at Charleston, South Carolina on 5 December and were joined by the second echelon under William Heth on 7 April. The third unit under Abraham Buford left still later and was nearly wiped out at the Battle of Waxhaws. Parker and Heth led the 1st and 2nd Virginia Detachments, which were new units. From 14 February to 6 March, the 3rd North Carolina Regiment was assigned to Parker's Brigade. On 8 May 1780 Parker died of wounds sustained during the Siege of Charleston. Another source gives Parker's date of death as 24 April. He was one of about 90 Americans killed during the siege, which resulted in Lincoln's surrender of 2,650 Continental Army soldiers, plus militia.
