= Virginia Line =

Formation within the Continental Army during the American Revolutionary War

The Virginia Line was a formation within the Continental Army. The term "Virginia Line" referred to the quota of numbered infantry regiments assigned to Virginia at various times by the Continental Congress. These, together with similar contingents from the other twelve states, formed the Continental Line. The concept was particularly important in relation to the promotion of commissioned officers. Officers of the Continental Army below the rank of brigadier general were ordinarily ineligible for promotion except in the line of their own state.

Not all Continental infantry regiments raised in a state were part of a state quota, however. On December 27, 1776, the Continental Congress gave Washington temporary control over certain military decisions that the Congress ordinarily regarded as its own prerogative. These “dictatorial powers” included the authority to raise sixteen additional Continental infantry regiments at large. Early in 1777, Washington offered command of one of these additional regiments to Nathaniel Gist of Virginia, who accepted. He also offered command of an additional regiment to William Grayson of Virginia, who accepted. In 1776, Grayson had served as one of Washington's personal aides. Finally, Washington offered command of an additional regiment to Charles Mynn Thruston of Virginia, who accepted.

Still other Continental infantry regiments and smaller units, also unrelated to a state quota, were raised as needed for special or temporary service. The independent companies raised by Virginia in 1777 to garrison Fort Pitt and Fort Randolph were examples of such “extra” units. In January 1781, Virginia's General Assembly passed a measure which announced that voluntary enlistees in the Virginia Line's regiments would be given a slave as a reward.

== Virginia Provincial Regiments, 1775 ==
In August 1775 the Virginia Convention voted to raise fifteen companies to serve one year. The companies were raised in the fall of 1775 and organized into two regiments. The Continental Congress resolved, on November 1, 1775, to place these two regiments on the Continental establishment. The regiments were designated the 1st and 2d Virginia Regiments.

- The 1st Virginia Regiment was commanded by Patrick Henry.
- The 2d Virginia Regiment was commanded by William Woodford.

== Virginia Line, 1776 ==
On December 28, 1775, the Continental Congress voted to raise four more regiments in Virginia. The Virginia Convention concurred on January 11, 1776. The Convention ordered that an additional 72 companies be raised and that the term of service of the original fifteen companies be extended. The 87 companies were to be organized into nine regiments of ten companies each (the 9th Virginia Regiment having at first only seven companies). The new force was to serve for not exceeding two and a half years. The 1st and 2d Virginia Regiments were reconstituted; the 3d through 6th Virginia Regiments were raised as Continental regiments; and the 7th through 9th Virginia Regiments were raised as state troops. In the course of 1776 the state regiments were placed on the Continental establishment.

- The 1st Virginia Regiment.
- The 2nd Virginia Regiment.
- The 3rd Virginia Regiment.
- The 4th Virginia Regiment.
- The 5th Virginia Regiment.
- The 6th Virginia Regiment.
- The 7th Virginia Regiment.
- The 8th Virginia Regiment.
- The 9th Virginia Regiment.

== Virginia Line, 1777 ==
On September 16, 1776, the Continental Congress resolved to raise an army of eighty-eight infantry regiments which were to serve for the duration of the war. Virginia was called upon to contribute fifteen of these regiments. The 1st through 9th Virginia Regiments were reconstituted in the Continental Army as regiments raised to serve for the duration of the war. The cadres for these regiments were drawn from the regiments which Virginia had sent to the field in 1775 and 1776. The remaining six regiments (the 10th through 15th Virginia Regiments) were entirely new.

- The 1st Virginia Regiment
- The 2nd Virginia Regiment
- The 3rd Virginia Regiment
- The 4th Virginia Regiment
- The 5th Virginia Regiment
- The 6th Virginia Regiment
- The 7th Virginia Regiment
- The 8th Virginia Regiment
- The 9th Virginia Regiment
- The 10th Virginia Regiment
- The 11th Virginia Regiment
- The 12th Virginia Regiment
- The 13th Virginia Regiment
- The 14th Virginia Regiment
- The 15th Virginia Regiment

Three Additional Continental regiments were raised and allotted to Virginia in 1777. There were 16 Additional regiments planned of which only 14 were actually raised. The responsibility for raising these units did not rest with the states, but with the Continental Congress which gave George Washington almost complete control over them. The colonels were Nathaniel Gist, William Grayson, and Charles Mynn Thruston. In 1779 the three units were consolidated into Gist's regiment.

- Gist's Additional Continental Regiment
- Grayson's Additional Continental Regiment
- Thruston's Additional Continental Regiment

== Reorganization of the Virginia Line, 1778-1779 ==
The Continental Congress ordered a reorganization of the Continental Army on May 27, 1778. Under this resolve, the Virginia quota was reduced from fifteen infantry regiments to eleven. In September 1778 the Virginia Line was in the vicinity of White Plains, New York, after serving at the Battle of Monmouth. New commissions issued at this time were dated September 14, 1778. In the White Plains rearrangement the Virginia Line was reorganized thus:

- The 1st Virginia Regiment absorbed the 9th Virginia Regiment of 1777.
- The 2nd Virginia Regiment absorbed the 6th Virginia Regiment of 1777.
- The 3rd Virginia Regiment absorbed the 5th Virginia Regiment of 1777.
- The 4th Virginia Regiment absorbed the 8th Virginia Regiment of 1777.

(The 5th Virginia Regiment was consolidated with the 3rd Virginia Regiment).
(The 6th Virginia Regiment was consolidated with the 2nd Virginia Regiment).

- The 7th Virginia Regiment of 1777 was redesignated the 5th Virginia Regiment of 1779.

(The 8th Virginia Regiment was consolidated with the 4th Virginia Regiment).
(The 9th Virginia Regiment was consolidated with the 1st Virginia Regiment).

- The 10th Virginia Regiment of 1777 was redesignated the 6th Virginia Regiment of 1779.
- The 11th Virginia Regiment of 1777 was redesignated the 7th Virginia Regiment of 1779.
- The 12th Virginia Regiment of 1777 was redesignated the 8th Virginia Regiment of 1779.
- The 13th Virginia Regiment of 1777 was redesignated the 9th Virginia Regiment of 1779.
- The 14th Virginia Regiment of 1777 was redesignated the 10th Virginia Regiment of 1779.
- The 15th Virginia Regiment of 1777 was redesignated the 11th Virginia Regiment of 1779.

The Virginia regiments were still understrength and continued to dwindle in 1779, reduced to a fraction of their paper strength; at this point, regimental history becomes very confusing to track. Given the number of men fit for duty, these “regiments” are not really “regiments” at all any more, yet they are still named as such. In 1780, the word “Detachment” comes into use, describing a 700-man conglomeration of these “regiments.” The 1st Virginia Detachment was led by Richard Parker. The 2nd Virginia Detachment was formed out of various regiments under the 2d Virginia Regiment's original colonel, Brigadier General William Woodford, including elements of the 2nd Virginia Regiment. The 3rd Virginia Detachment would be formed under Colonel Abraham Buford and was composed of elements of the 7th Virginia, as well as various pieces of other units. The first two Detachments of the Virginia Line served at the Siege of Charleston in South Carolina and were surrendered to the British Army on 12 May 1780. The 3rd Detachment was cut to pieces at the Battle of Waxhaws; the Virginia line had effectively ceased to exist. The single exception was the two-company 9th Virginia Regiment of 1779, which was stationed at Fort Pitt (the present Pittsburgh, Pennsylvania).

== Reorganization of the Virginia Line, 1781 ==
In October 1780 the Continental Congress, in consultation with George Washington, ordered a further reorganization of the Continental Army. Under this reorganization, which was to be effective on January 1, 1781, Virginia was assigned a quota of eight infantry regiments. The Virginia Line was reorganized thus:

- 1st Virginia Regiment.
- 2d Virginia Regiment.
- 3d Virginia Regiment.
- 4th Virginia Regiment.
- 5th Virginia Regiment (1779).
- 6th Virginia Regiment (1779),

(The 7th Virginia Regiment of 1779 was disbanded).

- The 7th Virginia Regiment (1781) (Constituted by redesignation of the 9th Virginia Regiment of 1779).
- The 8th Virginia Regiment (1779).

(The 9th Virginia Regiment of 1779 was redesignated the 7th Virginia Regiment of 1781).
(The 10th Virginia Regiment of 1779 was disbanded).
(The 11th Virginia Regiment of 1779 was disbanded).
