= 8th Virginia Regiment =

- Active: 1776–1779
- Allegiance: (United States) Continental Congress
- Type: Infantry
- Size: 8 to 10 companies
- Part of: Virginia Line
- Engagements: Battle of Sullivan's Island (1776); Battle of Brandywine (1777); Battle of Germantown (1777); Battle of Monmouth (1778)

Commanders
- Notable commanders: Colonel Peter Muhlenberg; Colonel Abraham Bowman; Colonel John Neville; Colonel James Wood

The 8th Virginia Regiment or German Regiment was an infantry unit that served in the Continental Army during the American Revolutionary War. Authorized in January 1776, the regiment was raised from men of several northwestern counties in the strength of 10 companies. Its first commander was Colonel Peter Muhlenberg, a clergyman and militia leader. The unit marched to defend Charleston, South Carolina in 1776, but saw no fighting. At the start of 1777, the 8th Virginia moved to join George Washington's main army. When Muhlenberg was promoted to general officer, Colonel Abraham Bowman took command of the unit.

Assigned to the 4th Virginia Brigade of Charles Scott, the 8th Virginia Regiment was heavily engaged at Brandywine and Germantown in the late summer and fall of 1777. Soon after, the unit was reduced to an eight company establishment and John Neville became its colonel. Shortly after the regiment fought at Monmouth in June 1778, it was reassigned to the 3rd Virginia Brigade. James Wood assumed command of the 8th Virginia in September 1778. The unit was merged with the 4th Virginia Regiment on 12 May 1779 and went out of existence. Exactly a year later, the 4th Virginia was captured by the British army at the Siege of Charleston.

== History ==
=== Formation to Germantown ===
The 8th Virginia Regiment was raised beginning on 11 January 1776 for service with the Virginia State Troops. The unit's first commanding officer was patriot leader and pastor Peter Muhlenberg, who became a militia colonel in 1775 at the request of Washington. In his last sermon from the pulpit, Muhlenberg read from Ecclesiastes 3:1, "There is a time for all things, a time to preach and a time to pray; but there is also a time to fight, and that time has now come." He removed his clerical robes to show that he was wearing his uniform as a militia colonel. He quickly enlisted 300 men from his congregation in the unit that became the 8th Virginia. Muhlenberg was appointed colonel on 1 March 1776. The 8th Virginia organized at Suffolk County Court House between 9 February and 4 April 1776. The unit's 10 companies came from Augusta, Berkeley, Culpeper, Dunmore, Fincastle, Frederick, and Hampshire Counties, plus the District of West Augusta. On 25 May 1776 the regiment officially became part of the Continental Army. Aside from Colonel Muhlenberg, the unit's field officers were Lieutenant Colonel Abraham Bowman and Major Peter Helphenstine.

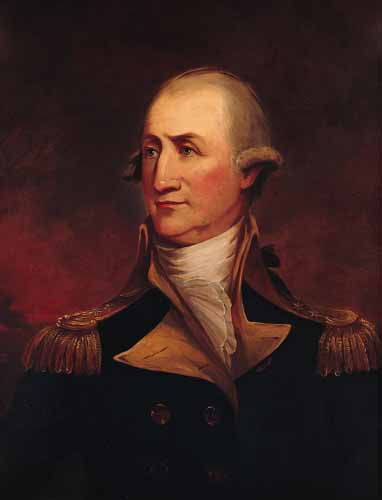
Peter Muhlenberg

In 1776, Virginia regiments were typically organized into 10 companies, of which seven carried muskets and three carried rifles. The regiment's 792-man roster had three field officers, and a staff that included an adjutant, quartermaster, surgeon, surgeon's mate, chaplain, sergeant major, quartermaster sergeant, and drum major. Each company consisted of one captain, two lieutenants, one ensign, four sergeants, four corporals, one drummer, one fifer, and 64 privates.

The 8th Virginia marched south to Charleston, South Carolina and was there in time for the Battle of Sullivan's Island on 28 June 1776, but it was not in action. On 21 January 1777, the regiment received orders to join George Washington's main army. Muhlenberg was promoted brigadier general on 21 February and Abraham Bowman became colonel of the 8th Virginia on 22 March. At that time, the other two field officers were Lieutenant Colonel John Markham and Major William Darke. On 11 May 1777, the unit was assigned to the 4th Virginia Brigade, together with the 4th and 12th Virginia Regiments, Grayson's Additional Continental Regiment, and Patton's Additional Continental Regiment. Charles Scott was appointed to lead the brigade.

At the Battle of Brandywine on 11 September 1777, Scott's and William Woodford's Virginia brigades were part of Adam Stephen's division. That morning, Sir William Howe marched one wing of his army 17 miles (27 km) to reach a position in the rear of the American right flank. George Washington immediately ordered the divisions of Stephen, John Sullivan, and Lord Stirling to block Howe. Stephen's 1,500 troops held the right, Stirling's 1,500 men defended the center, and Sullivan's soldiers began forming on the left of the position. The Americans were outnumbered by about 8,000 to 4,000 men. Supported by two cannons, Stephen's division held a wooded hill in an area called Sandy Hollow. At first, the division sturdily held its ground against the British 2nd Light Infantry Battalion and the Hessian Jägers. The British attack broke Sullivan's division first. Attacked in front and on their newly exposed left flank, Stirling's men withdrew next. At last the British converged on Scott's brigade, which held the left flank of Stephen's line. The Virginians finally gave way and retreated.

At the Battle of Germantown on 4 October 1777, Scott's brigade in Stephen's division accompanied Nathanael Greene's column. Washington planned for this body of troops to assault the British right flank while Sullivan and Stirling attacked the enemy left. Sullivan's and Anthony Wayne's divisions attacked first and made some progress, but Greene's wing was late in arriving. The deployment of Greene's column was confused. The divisions of Greene and Stephen advanced so quickly that Alexander McDougall's Connecticut Brigade lost sight of them. Meanwhile, Stephen accused Scott of separating his brigade from the division. One observer believed that the brigades of Scott and Muhlenberg (in Greene's division) attacked together. Part of Woodford's brigade and its supporting artillery stopped to fire on 100 British troops at the Chew House. As Stephen's division went forward, it encountered some of Wayne's troops in the fog and a friendly fire incident resulted which caused Wayne's men to retreat.

=== Monmouth to Charleston ===
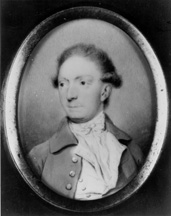
William Grayson led a detachment at Monmouth.

The number of companies in the regiment was reduced to eight on 1 November 1777. John Neville took command of the 8th Virginia on 10 December. At the Battle of Monmouth, the 4th, 8th, and 12th Virginia Regiments fought as a converged battle group under the command of James Wood. The Virginians were part of William Grayson's 600-man detachment along with Grayson's and Patton's Additional Continental Regiments and Thomas Wells' two-gun company of the 3rd Continental Artillery Regiment. Under the overall command of Charles Lee, Grayson's detachment led the American column of march at 8:00 AM on 28 June 1778. Meanwhile, Philemon Dickinson's New Jersey militia was being pushed back by the Queen's Rangers. As Grayson's detachment approached, the Queen's Rangers withdrew to the east. Dickinson advised Grayson not to advance across a bridge because it would put his troops in a difficult position with British troops nearby. However, Lee placed Wayne in command of Grayson, two detachments under Richard Butler and Henry Jackson, and Eleazer Oswald's four cannons and sent the troops forward about 9:00 AM. Seeing British troops at 9:30 AM, Wayne sent Butler and Jackson to attack them while holding back Grayson's men.

Lee soon saw that, instead of a small rear guard, he faced Sir Henry Clinton and at least 6,000 troops. At this point, a number of American units began retreating without orders. One of Lee's aides ordered Grayson to pull back. Unable to halt the retrograde movement, Lee ordered a general retreat before the unexpected British advance. As Washington rode forward, he was distressed to see Lee's division retreating, led by Grayson's and Patton's Additional Regiments. Farther on, Washington encountered Walter Stewart and Nathaniel Ramsey and asked them to hold off the British with their detachments. They formed their men in a dense wood on the left while Jeremiah Olney and Henry Livingston Jr. deployed behind a hedgerow on the right, supported by Oswald's four guns. It is probable that Wood's Virginians joined Stewart and Ramsey on the left. A sharp action followed as the Americans in the trees ambushed the 1st Battalion of the Brigade of Guards as it attempted to move past. Stung by the surprise fire which wounded their commander, the Guards stormed the woods at the cost of 40 casualties and drove the Americans into the open. Stewart was wounded while Ramsey was cut down and captured by troopers of the British 16th Light Dragoons. British grenadiers then overran the hedgerow after heavy fighting that claimed the life of Colonel Henry Monckton.

On 22 July 1778, the 8th Virginia transferred to the 3rd Virginia Brigade. James Wood became colonel on 14 September 1778 and led the unit for the remainder of its career. The regiment was merged into the 4th Virginia Regiment on 12 May 1779. Under the command of Woodford, about 750 Virginia Continentals arrived at Charleston, South Carolina on 6 April 1780 after a march of 500 miles (805 km) in four weeks. The Siege of Charleston ended on 12 May 1780 with Benjamin Lincoln's surrender. At least 2,650 American Continentals were captured in addition to militiamen. Among the prisoners were the soldiers of the 4th Virginia.

The 8th Virginia was known as the German Regiment. The regiment should not be confused with Colonel Nicholas Haussegger's regiment, which was known as the German Battalion.

== Service record ==
Designation	Date	Brigade	Department
8th Virginia Regiment	11 January 1776	none	none
8th Virginia Regiment	25 May 1776	none	Southern
8th Virginia Regiment	21 January 1777	none	Main Army
8th Virginia Regiment	11 May 1777	4th Virginia	Main Army
8th Virginia Regiment	22 July 1778	3rd Virginia	Main Army
8th Virginia Regiment	12 May 1779	3rd Virginia	consolidated
