= Walter Stewart (general) =

Irish-born American military officer (1756–1796)

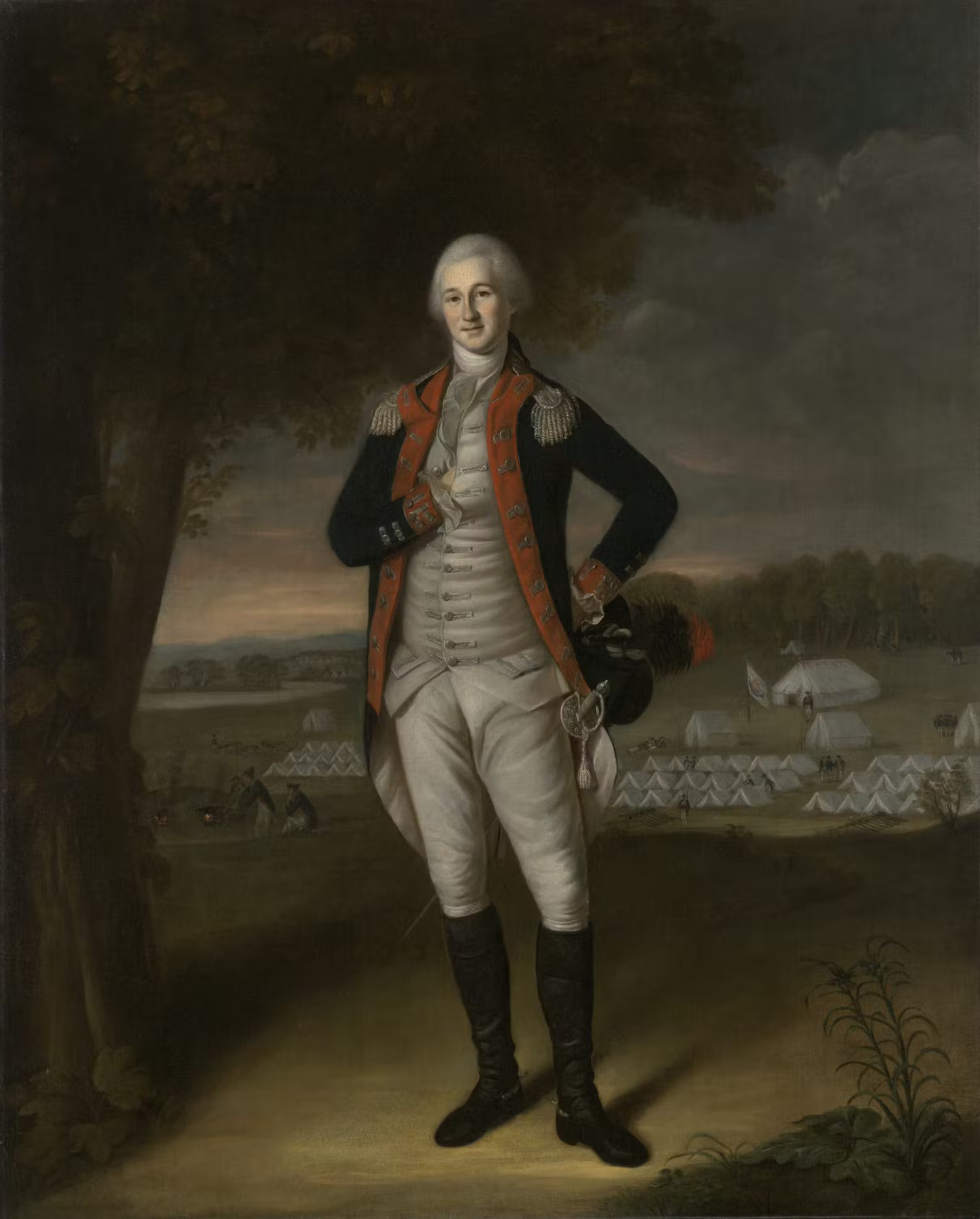
- Portrait by Charles Willson Peale, 1781

Personal details
- Born: 1756 Derry, Ireland
- Died: June 16, 1796 (aged 39–40) Philadelphia, Pennsylvania, U.S.
- Spouse: Deborah McClenachan
- Children: 8

Military service
- Allegiance: United States
- Branch/service: Continental Army; Pennsylvania Militia
- Years of service: 1776–1783
- Rank: Brevet Brigadier general (Continental Army); Major general (Pennsylvania Militia)
- Battles/wars: American Revolutionary War; Battle of Brandywine; Battle of Germantown; Battle of Monmouth; Battle of Green Spring; Siege of Yorktown

Walter Stewart (1756 – June 16, 1796) was an Irish-born American military officer who served in the American Revolutionary War. Stewart began his military career as captain of a Continental Army company at the beginning of the American Revolutionary War. He served as an aide-de-camp to Horatio Gates for a year with the rank of major.

Given command of the Pennsylvania State Regiment, which later became the 13th Pennsylvania Regiment, Stewart led his troops with distinction at Brandywine and Germantown in 1777. He was wounded while leading a detachment at the Battle of Monmouth in the summer of 1778. Despite Stewart's ability to cool tensions during the 1780 mutiny of the Connecticut Line, his regiment later became involved in the Pennsylvania Line Mutiny.

He was married in Philadelphia in 1781 before going south with the army to fight in the siege of Yorktown. Following the end of the siege, Stewart was deeply involved in the Newburgh Conspiracy. Following a term as Inspector General, he retired from the army at the beginning of 1783, and became a successful Philadelphia businessman and a major general in the Pennsylvania Militia. He died on June 16, 1796, during an outbreak of yellow fever.

== Early life ==
He was a younger son of David and Isabella Stewart of Letterkenny, County Donegal, and in 1772 was sent to join the trading house of Conyngham and Nesbitt in Philadelphia. By 1779 he was a partner in that concern which had been established by his mother’s brother, Redmond Conyngham, thirty years earlier.

== Military career ==
=== Early career ===
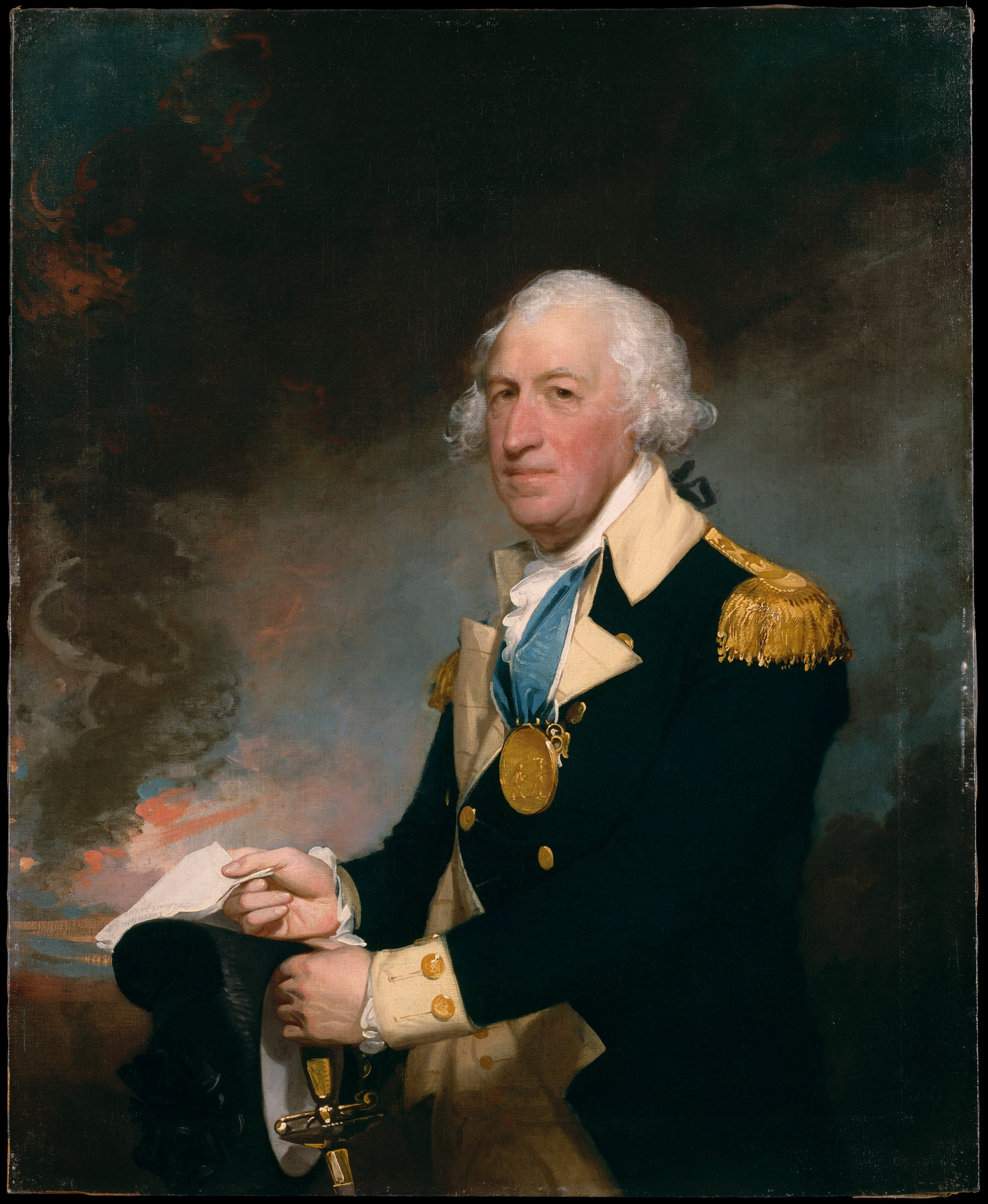
Horatio Gates, whom Stewart served as an aide-de-camp

In January 1776 he was appointed captain of Company F, 3rd Pennsylvania Battalion. The eight company strong 3rd Battalion was authorized on December 9, 1775, and organized between January and March 1776 in Philadelphia. It joined George Washington's main army on June 11, 1776, and was assigned to Thomas Mifflin's brigade. However, in May Stewart was promoted to major and became aide-de-camp to Horatio Gates when that general transferred to the Northern Department. In December 1776, Gates returned to the Philadelphia area with the Northern Department's New Jersey and Pennsylvania regiments. That November, Congress voted Stewart a $100 sword as recognition of his services.

One Continental Army private recalled that the ladies of Philadelphia called the good-looking Stewart the "Irish Beauty". Another observer described him as, "of fair, florid complexion, vivacious, intelligent and well-educated, and, it was said, was the handsomest man in the American army". On June 17, 1777, Stewart was named commander of the Pennsylvania State Regiment, which later became the 13th Pennsylvania Regiment.

Stewart, who was Gates' subordinate for over a year, took his former chief's side in the political struggle between Gates and his rival Philip Schuyler. When Gates assumed command of the Northern Department in August 1777, Stewart wrote him, "You can't Imagine my Dear Sir, the Satisfaction it gives me your being sent back to your proper Command. It is so great a thing, to get the better so Nobly of that petty party, for I can call them by no other Name." In another letter to Gates, he wrote of his fellow Pennsylvanian Anthony Wayne having to dig trenches, "We are throwing up a few works at Wilmington, where Wayne is like a mad bear, it falling to his brigade. I believe he heartily wishes all engineers at the devil."

=== Philadelphia campaign ===
At the Battle of Brandywine on September 11, 1777, the Pennsylvania State Regiment fought with the 2nd, 3rd, 4th, 10th, and 14th Virginia Regiments in George Weedon's Brigade. Another authority wrote that the 2nd Virginia Brigade consisted of the 2nd, 6th, 10th, and 14th Virginia, but it is possible that some units were attached and others detached. That day, Washington with 11,000 men offered battle to a British army of 12,500 troops under General Sir William Howe. While 5,000 British and Hessian troops under Wilhelm von Knyphausen threatened the American center, Howe took 7,500 men in a wide turning movement that crossed the Brandywine beyond the American right flank. Belatedly detecting Howe's column, Washington deployed the divisions of John Sullivan, Lord Stirling, and Adam Stephen to halt the attempted envelopment. After severe fighting, Howe's force cracked the American line. Leaving Wayne to hold off Knyphausen, Washington ordered the division of Nathanael Greene to block Howe.

After his brigade endured a three or four-mile double-time march in 45 minutes, Weedon arranged his troops on a reverse slope behind a fence. He swung the right flank forward behind a fence and some woods so as to take any attackers in enfilade. Henry Monckton's 2nd Grenadier Battalion blundered into Weedon's trap as dusk fell. As his men came under heavy fire, Monckton asked Hessian Captain Johann von Ewald to ride and get help. The Hessian found James Agnew who brought up his 4th Brigade on Monckton's left. One of Agnew's regiments, the 64th Foot was roughly treated, suffering 47 casualties in the vicious firefight that followed. The Pennsylvania State Regiment was evidently part of the thrown-forward right flank. One witness recalled the unit's colonel, "Stewart on foot, in its rear, animating his men." An officer in the regiment wrote that, "Our regiment fought at one stand about an hour under incessant fire, and yet the loss was less than at Long Island; neither were we so near each other as at Princeton, our common distance being about 50 yards." With the assistance of some artillery, the British finally forced the Americans back, but the exhausted victors did not pursue in the dark.

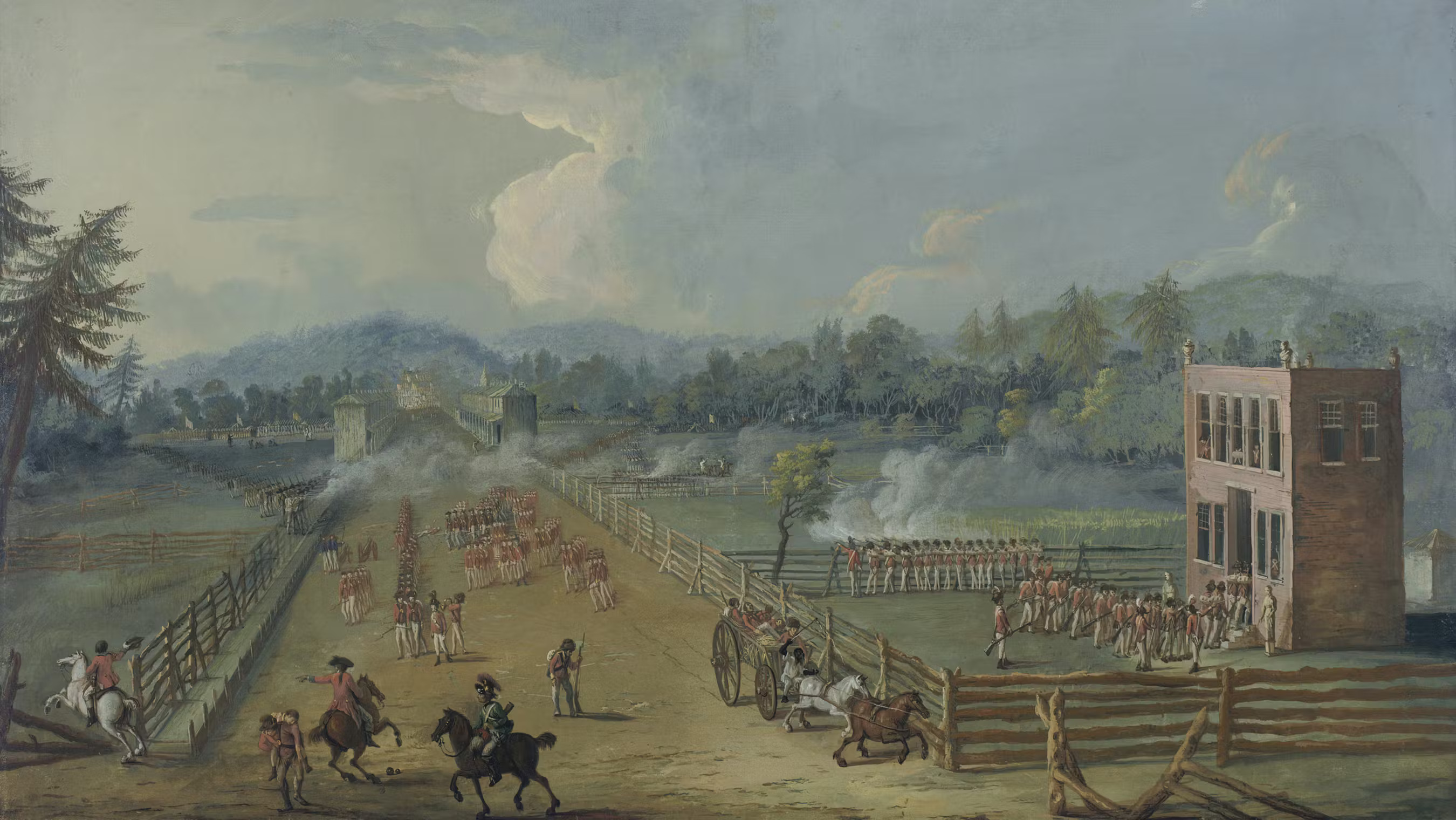
The Battle of Germantown, where Stewart's men captured an earthwork

Stewart led a detachment of his regiment at the Battle of Germantown on October 4, 1777. As Greene's wing advanced on the British positions, Stewart's unit covered Weedon's left flank where a gap had developed between that brigade and Alexander McDougall's Connecticut Brigade. After driving off two British light infantry companies, his men captured an earthwork near Luken's Mill. He wrote Gates, "I took a little redoubt with three Pieces of Cannon from them". He noted that, "It was cursed Hot work for it before they left them". He noted that his men started fighting 1.5 miles (2.4 km) from Germantown and penetrated the British lines as far as the Market House. Another officer recalled that the Pennsylvania State Regiment had overcome all resistance in its front. When it was attacked on its left and rear, "Gen. Steven [Stephen] ordered Col. Stewart to evacuate the ground". On November 12, 1777, the regiment was renamed the 13th Pennsylvania Regiment.

=== Monmouth ===
After Sir Henry Clinton evacuated Philadelphia and marched toward New York, George Washington moved his army northeast from Valley Forge, Pennsylvania. After crossing the Delaware at Coryell's Ferry, the Americans reached Hopewell, New Jersey, on June 23. From there, they moved to intercept Clinton's retreat. Washington appointed his second-in-command Charles Lee to lead his advance guard. Lee's division included Varnum's 300-man Brigade under John Durkee with two cannons, William Grayson's 600-strong detachment with two guns, William Maxwell's 1,000-man New Jersey Brigade with two cannons, Henry Jackson's 300-strong detachment, Charles Scott's 1,440-strong command with four guns, and Anthony Wayne's 1,000-man command with two guns. There were seven special detachments of troops averaging about 350 men each and these were probably drawn from their parent brigades and other units. Scott led four detachments while Wayne led three detachments. Wayne's command included detachments led by James Wesson of Ebenezer Learned's Massachusetts Brigade, Henry Livingston Jr. of Enoch Poor's New Hampshire and New York brigade, and Stewart.

Very early on June 28, 1778, Wilhelm von Knyphausen's division set out from Monmouth Court House, followed a few hours later by Cornwallis' division. Lee neglected to scout the area and announced to his subordinates that he had no plan of battle other than to act according to circumstances. He only began moving forward at 7:00 am with 5,000 troops to bring on the Battle of Monmouth. When Lee began to threaten the British rear guard, Clinton turned back to help with powerful forces. After some tentative attacks, Lee's troops began withdrawing in confusion but not panic. Clinton rushed in pursuit.

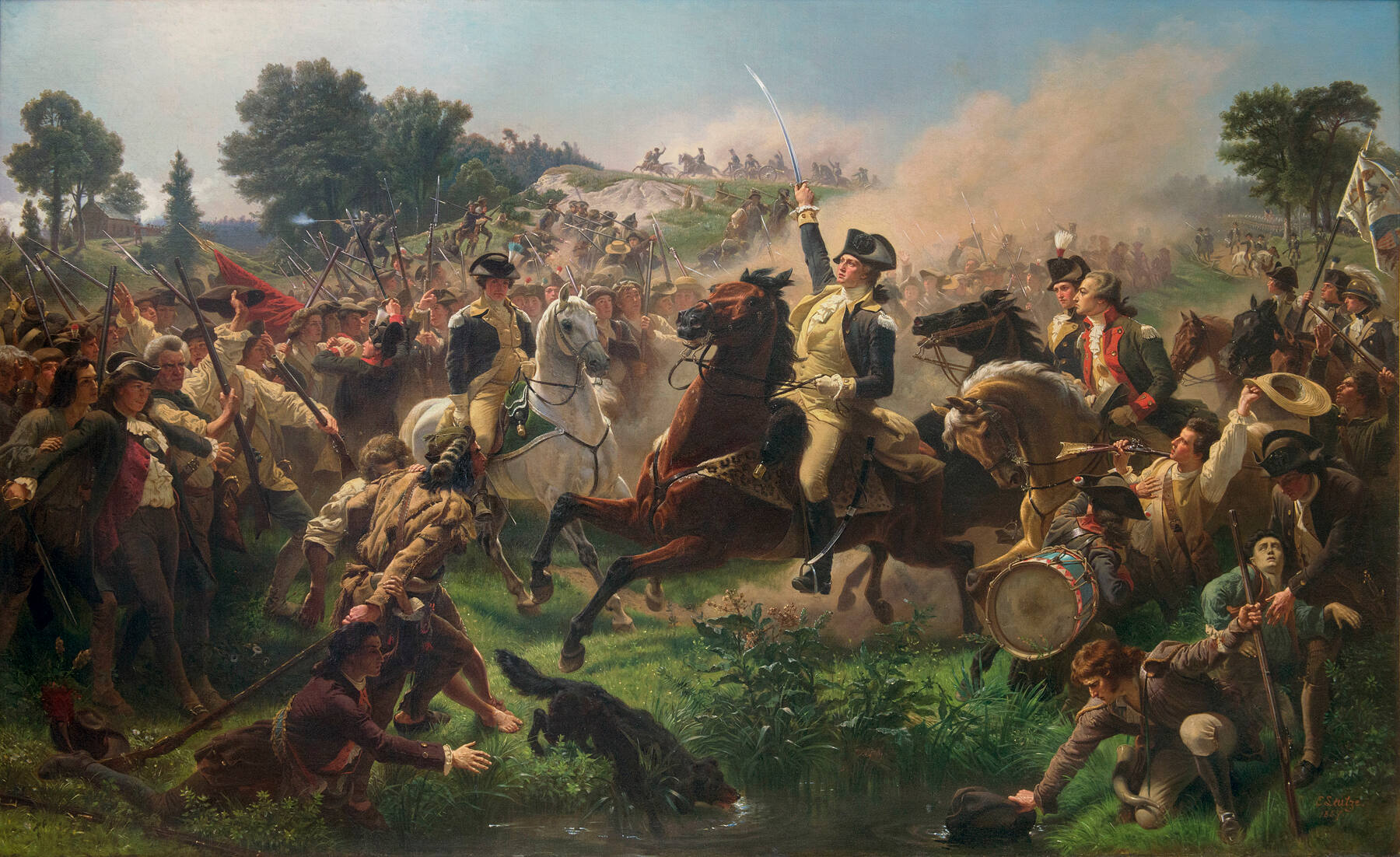
The Battle of Monmouth, where Stewart was wounded

Washington met Lee's retreating division late in the morning and took measures to halt Clinton's advance. Washington relieved Lee of command, but later allowed him to patch together a defensive line with the available troops. Lee put Varnum's Brigade, now under the command of Jeremiah Olney behind a hedgerow. Livingston's detachment filed into line on Olney's left. On the left flank of the position, Washington asked Stewart and Nathaniel Ramsey, who took over from the wounded Wesson, to hold off the British until he could get the main army in position. The two readily agreed. Soon after, Anthony Wayne appeared and ordered the two detachments to hold a thick wood. Ramsey formed on the extreme left with Stewart to his right. Lee's chief of artillery, Eleazer Oswald placed two cannons on Olney's right and two more in support of Stewart and Ramsey.

As the 1st Guards Battalion came abreast of the woods, the Americans riddled their flank and inflicted 41 casualties. But the crack Brigade of Guards and two companies of the 1st Grenadier Battalion stormed into the woods. Early in the action, Stewart went down, shot in the groin, and was carried to the rear. The outnumbered Americans were pressed back from the trees and attacked by the 16th Light Dragoons in the open. Ramsey was wounded and captured by the dragoons while the Americans made a dash for the bridge across the ravine. After another epic struggle on the other flank, Olney, Livingston, and Oswald were forced back. But the holding actions gave Washington time to deploy Lord Stirling's division athwart Clinton's advance.

=== Command of the 2nd Pennsylvania Regiment ===
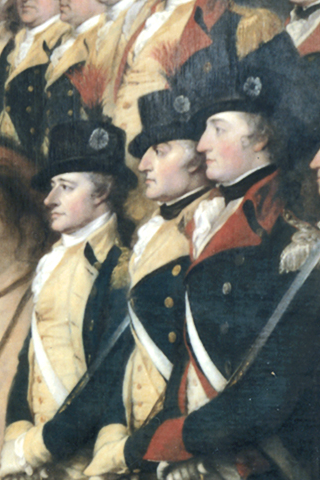
Detail of Surrender of Lord Cornwallis by John Trumbull, showing Colonels Alexander Hamilton, John Laurens, and Stewart

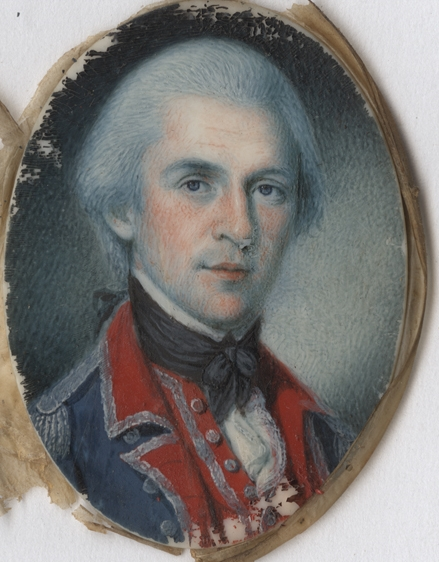
1781 miniature portrait of Stewart by Charles Willson Peale

Stewart assumed command of the 2nd Pennsylvania Regiment on July 1, 1778, as the senior officer remaining after enlistments ran out for most of the men of the 13th and the remaining men were consolidated with the 2nd Regiment. He earned a good reputation with his soldiers by paying close attention to their needs. In Fall 1778, he traveled to Philadelphia to secure some items for his troops. He wrote his friend Anthony Wayne, perhaps with tongue in cheek, that the ladies, "have really got the art of throwing themselves into the most wanton and amorous postures", when he was around.

When elements of the Connecticut Line mutinied in 1780 at Morristown, New Jersey, the "dependable" Pennsylvania regiment surrounded them and restored order. At the time, Stewart and other Pennsylvanians reassured the soldiers that their problems were no worse than in other units. Stewart then spoke with the Connecticut officers on behalf of the disgruntled rank and file. Connecticut private Joseph Plumb Martin recalled that Stewart was highly regarded by his own men.

Stewart's regiment joined the Pennsylvania Line Mutiny, which began on January 1, 1781, at Morristown. At the beginning of the mutiny, most of the 2nd Regiment's soldiers balked at participating; however, after being threatened by mutineers, the 2nd Regiment joined in the march on Philadelphia. Ignoring orders from their officers, soldiers had assembled under the direction of their sergeants, armed themselves, and had begun to march south toward Philadelphia. Three officers were slain. The soldiers had a number of grievances that were viewed as legitimate, and at Trenton, New Jersey, troops negotiated with representatives of Congress and won important concessions, including a new bounty.

Afterward, the Pennsylvania Line was reorganized, and Stewart was placed in charge of a new combat unit.

=== Green Spring and Yorktown ===
On July 6, 1781, Stewart led a Pennsylvania battalion at the Battle of Green Spring. At first, his troops formed the reserve of Wayne's 500-man advance guard. After being reinforced to 900 men by the addition of one light infantry and two Pennsylvania battalions, the Americans walked into a British ambush. Outnumbered seven-to-one, Wayne ordered a counterattack. This bold action and the approach of nightfall allowed the Americans to escape with only 28 killed, 99 wounded, and 12 missing. The British suffered 75 killed or wounded.

In October 1781, Stewart participated in the siege of Yorktown as commander of the 1st Pennsylvania Battalion in General Wayne's brigade of Von Steuben's division.

=== Newburgh conspiracy ===
Stewart retired from the army on January 1, 1783. However, Washington convinced him to stay on as Inspector General of the Northern Department. Soon after, he became involved with the Newburgh Conspiracy.

By the winter of 1782–1783, with the war all but won, Stewart remained in Philadelphia while much of the Continental Army camped at Newburgh, New York.

Earlier in the war, the Second Continental Congress had promised officers they would receive a life pension of half-pay beginning on October 21, 1780, but had made no effort to back up this promise. As officers and soldiers at Newburgh realized that they needed to get Congress to give them their back pay before the army was disbanded, the situation there began to develop into a crisis. In January 1783, a committee of officers drew up a petition listing the army's grievances and presented it to Congress. Washington wrote to members of Congress that the officers' claims were legitimate; nevertheless, Congress defeated a measure that would have given full pay for five years as compensation for the promised pension. Although Washington was not unsympathetic to his officers' position, he was apprehensive of the consequences of a large-scale mutiny, and notified Congress that he would do all he could to stop the army from rebelling.

When Walter Stewart arrived at Newburgh, a cabal of officers enlisted him to speak with Washington and to sound him out, in the hope of bringing Washington around to their view on a matter of greater importance to them than either back pay or pensions. According to Rufus King, a majority of American officers expected that after the army was disbanded, they would be considerably worse off as civilians. Lacking wealth or family influence, they would lose their respectability, facing "a prospect of obscurity if not of actual misery." To them, "their military situation was more inviting and pleasant" than any that they could hope for in peacetime, and accordingly, their object was at least to maintain the Continental Army as a perpetual standing army.

Stewart sensed that Washington did not agree with his approach, so he turned instead to the sympathetic Horatio Gates, his former superior. According to historian Mark M. Boatner III, Stewart was the real mover behind the Newburgh Conspiracy. He warned his fellow officers that Congress planned to disband the army so that it would not have to meet their demands. He urged the other officers to stand together and force Congress to pay them immediately.

Matters came to a head on March 10, 1783, with the publication of the first Newburgh Address. Gates' aide-de-camp John Armstrong Jr. has been credited with writing the address, which Gates approved in advance. Alexander Hamilton also urged the army to take action against Congress. A second address appeared on March 12, attempting to co-opt Washington into the conspiracy.

Washington moved quickly to quell the impending mutiny by calling an officers' meeting on March 15. He also notified Congress that it needed to act soon on the army's grievances. At the officers' meeting Washington appealed to his audience not to carry out "any measures which, viewed in the calm light of reason, will lessen the dignity and sully the glory you have hitherto maintained." At the end of his speech he took out a letter to read. Unable to read it, he took out his spectacles and said, "Gentlemen, you must pardon me. I have grown gray in your service and now find myself growing blind". Some of his officers were reduced to tears. In a unanimous vote, the officers expressed confidence in Congress and repudiated the Newburgh Addresses. On March 22 Congress voted to adopt the compensation plan, which the officers then accepted.

Armstrong tried to revive the plot in April but gave it up when someone revealed the plan to Washington, and Gates quietly dropped out of the conspiracy. Armstrong later complained that a "timid wretch" betrayed the plan "to the only man from whom he was to have kept it... the Commander in Chief", who was not to have been consulted until later. According to historian Robert K. Wright Jr., the "wretch" to whom Armstrong referred was either Colonel John Brooks or Walter Stewart.

=== Later career and death ===
In 1783, Stewart finally retired from the army later with the brevet rank of brigadier general. He settled in Philadelphia across the street from George and Martha Washington and became a successful businessman and major general in the Pennsylvania Militia. Stewart died on June 16, 1796, in that year's deadly yellow fever epidemic and was interred in the burial ground of Old St. Paul's Episcopal Church in Philadelphia.

== Family ==
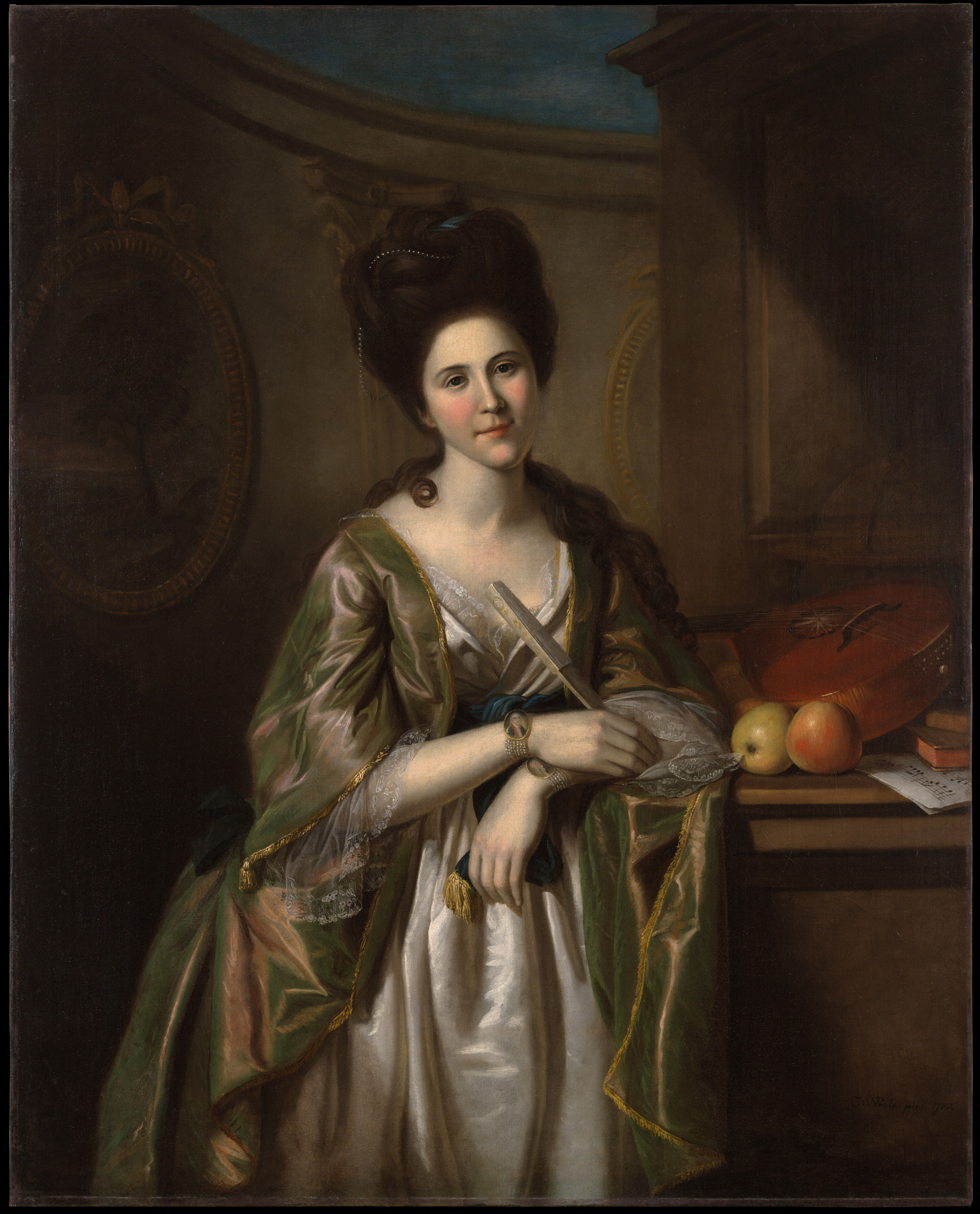
1782 portrait of Deborah McClenachan Stewart by Peale

On April 11, 1781, prior to end of the siege of Yorktown, Stewart was married to Deborah McClenachan, the 17-year-old eldest daughter of a Philadelphia businessman. Stewart's father-in-law, Blair McClenachan, was known as a founder of the First City Troop, and had bought the house known as Cliveden from Benjamin Chew in September 1779. Cliveden had been badly damaged in heavy fighting during the Battle of Germantown.

Stewart and his wife had eight children, including one born in Ireland, and another in England. The children were:

- William Stewart (1781–1808), died at sea
- Robert Stewart (1784–1806)
- Ann Mathilda Stewart (1786–1865), who married Philip Church (1778–1861), son of John Barker Church and Angelica Schuyler
- Walter Stewart (1787–1807)
- Henry Stewart (1788–1823)
- Mary Ann Stewart (1791–1844)
- Caroline Stewart, who died in infancy
- Washington Stewart (1796–1826), who was born two months after his father's death.
