= William Davies (Virginia) =

Continental Army officer

- Born: Delaware Colony, British America
- Died: Mecklenburg County, Virginia, U.S.
- Burial place: Mecklenburg County, Virginia, U.S.
- Spouse: Mary Murray Gordon
- Children: 4
- Relatives: Samuel Davies (father); William Holt (uncle)
- Military career
- Branch: Continental Army
- Rank: Colonel
- Units: 1st Virginia Regiment; 7th Virginia Regiment; 14th Virginia Regiment
- Conflicts: American Revolutionary War; Battle of Fort Washington (POW); Battle of Monmouth (WIA)

William Davies was a colonel in the Continental Army who served in the Virginia Line for the duration of the American Revolutionary War.

== Early life ==
William Davies was born to Jane (née Holt) and Samuel Davies in Delaware. His uncle was William Holt, mayor of Williamsburg, Virginia. He graduated from Princeton College.

== Career ==
Following graduation, Davies taught at Princeton College. He studied law under Richard Stockton. He worked as a lawyer in Norfolk.

Davies served in the American Revolutionary War and began his commission as a captain in the 1st Virginia Regiment on September 30, 1775. He was captured during the Battle of Fort Washington on November 16, 1776, and was later paroled. He was promoted to major in the 7th Virginia Regiment on March 22, 1777, and to lieutenant colonel of the 22nd Virginia on February 21, 1778. He was appointed lieutenant colonel commandant of the 14th Virginia Regiment on April 6, 1778, and was promoted to colonel retroactive to March 20, 1778. He was wounded in action at the Battle of Monmouth on June 28 of the same year. The 14th Virginia was redesignated the 10th Virginia on September 14, 1778. Davies was reassigned to the 1st Virginia on February 12, 1781. He served until the close of the war in 1783. He was an aide to George Washington and at one point aide to Marquis de Lafayette.

Davies was appointed by President Washington as a collector for the Port of Norfolk. He held that role until Jefferson's administration. He then was appointed to settle war accounts between Virginia and the federal government. During this time, he lived in New York City and Philadelphia.

== Personal life ==
Davies married Mary Murray Gordon, daughter of James Murray and widow of Alexander Gordon. They had four children, including Mary Ann.

Davies died at around 56 years of age at his "Davies" (later "Millbank") estate in Mecklenburg County. He was buried at the estate.
