= Richard Parker (judge, born 1729) =

American judge

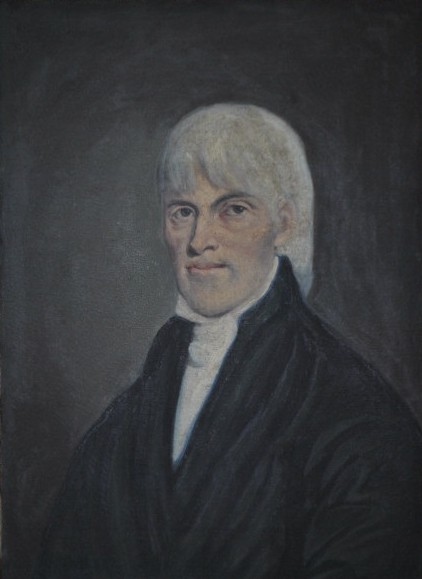
Oil on canvas portrait of Judge Richard Parker by Charles S. Forbes

Richard Parker (1729–1813) was a prominent American lawyer and judge from Westmoreland County, Virginia in the Northern Neck.

== Early life and education ==
His father was Alexander Parker, a physician of Essex County, Virginia. One early source believed him born in 1732.

== Personal life ==
He married Elizabeth Beale, daughter of William Beale of Richmond County, and his wife, the former Anne Harwar. They had at least three sons and several daughters. His namesake, Richard Parker Jr. became colonel of the First Virginia Regiment during the American Revolutionary war, but was killed at Charleston in 1780. Alexander Parker also attained the rank of colonel during the conflict, and later rose to the rank of Brigadier General of the Virginia militia. William Harwar Parker served in the Virginia Navy during the conflict, and his son, Richard Elliott Parker, would become a judge as well as U.S. Senator.

== Career ==
Parker became a member of the Northern Neck Association in 1766. In 1775 he was a member of the Westmoreland County Committee of Safety, and county voters elected him as one of their representative in the House of Delegates in 1778. He was appointed a judge of the general court in January 1788 and held that position until his death. He he also briefly served on the first Court of Appeals, as well as presided over cases in the East Virginia Circuit.

== Death and legacy ==
He remained on the bench of the General Court until his death on April 4, 1813, at Lawfield, his residence in Westmoreland. One of his sons, Richard Parker (1751–1780) became a Continental Army regimental commander during the American Revolutionary War and was killed at the Siege of Charleston. A grandson, Richard E. Parker (1783–1840), was a Virginia jurist and lawyer who heard cases in the Norfolk Circuit (1831) before moving to Clarke County, Virginia, and served briefly in the U.S. Senate (1836) before becoming a judge of the Supreme Court of Virginia (then known as the Court of Appeals). His home, Cool Spring,where the colonial road (modern Virginia State Route 7) crossed the Shenandoah River, would later become the site of a Civil War battle and is now a campus of Shenandoah University.
