= Mordecai Buckner =

- Born: ca. 1735
- Died: 1787; Spotsylvania County, Virginia
- Military career
- Allegiance: United States
- Service years: United Kingdom 1755–1762; United States 1776–1777
- Rank: Colonel (Continental Army)
- Conflicts: Seven Years' War: French and Indian War; American Revolutionary War: Battle of Trenton (1776)

Mordecai Buckner (ca. 1735 – 1787) was born in colonial Virginia and served as an officer in the French and Indian War. After the start of the American Revolutionary War he was appointed colonel of the 6th Virginia Regiment. He served in this capacity for about one year before he was cashiered and dismissed from the Continental Army. Buckner was the son of Thomas Buckner (died ca. 1755), a planter of Caroline Co., Virginia, who served as a justice of the peace and sheriff of that county, and Mary Timson. He married Elizabeth Beverly Chew in 1767 and the couple had at least two known children.

== Career ==
Buckner was first appointed quartermaster in 1755, then ensign later that year for then-Capt. Adam Stephen's militia company, and in 1758 during the French and Indian War, he was promoted to captain in Adam Stephen's Virginia regiment. He either rejoined the regiment or was still serving in 1762, for which he received 3,000 acres of land. In 1767, he married Elizabeth Beverly Chew, widow of Beverly Stanard.

During the colonial militia buildup at the onset of the American Revolution, on 12 Sep 1775, Buckner was elected lieutenant colonel of the minutemen raised by the combined Virginia counties of Spottsylvania, Caroline, Stafford, and King George under Col. Hugh Mercer. Both Buckner and Mercer were members of the Spottsylvania County committee. Having served under George Washington during the earlier war, he was not long after appointed commander of the 6th Virginia Regiment in the nascent Continental Army. His colonel's commission dated from 13 February 1776. The two other field officers were Lieutenant Colonel Thomas Elliott and Major James Hendricks. The regiment came into existence on 28 December 1775. It was organized at Williamsburg, Virginia in the strength of ten companies from men of ten different eastern and southern counties. Initially assigned to the Southern Department, the unit transferred to Stephen's Brigade in Washington's main army on 3 September 1776. Buckner commanded the 191-strong 6th Virginia at the Battle of Trenton on 26 December 1776. At that time, Hendricks was lieutenant colonel and Richard Parker was major. For reasons not given, Parker led the regiment at the battles of Assunpink Creek and Princeton on 2 and 3 January 1777.

On 23 January, separate actions were fought at Bonhamtown, Quibbletown, and Woodbridge, New Jersey during the Forage War. In one of these encounters, Buckner's subordinate, Lt. Col. Parker, engaged British troops but was unable to press what he felt was a significant advantage because Buckner failed to bring up support, having in fact fled the battle. Buckner was accused of misbehavior in combat and subsequently arrested for trial. While on parole, he attempted to flee and was reapprehended by a troop of light horse sent by General Washington. Buckner wrote a letter to the commander-in-chief pleading to be dismissed from the service without trial, but on 28 January 1777, Washington wrote him a curt letter in reply.

Sir: It is not in my power to comply with your request on three Accounts, yourself, the Country at large, and the State you come from, Were the matter to remain undetermined, your Reputation must be ruined; at all events, every Officer would have reason to expect equal favor, and I shall be justly taxed with partiality. Would you reflect on the Impropriety of your Petition, you would certainly withdraw it. Resolved as I am to reward merit, and punish demerit, I shall refer your case to the judgment of a Court Martial, and shall be happy to hear that it acquits you. I am, etc.

On 8 February Buckner was tried before a court martial and found guilty.

The General Court Martial held at Chatham, the 8th. Inst: whereof Brigadier General St. Clair was President, for the trial of Col Mordecai Buckner, accused of "Shamefully Misbehaving before the Enemy, in the Action of the 23rd. of Jan'y last," And of "Quitting his post and party in time of engagement," have after mature consideration, sentenced the said Col Mordecai Buckner, to be cashiered, and declared incapable of any military office, in the service of the United States. The General and Commander in Chief approves the sentence, and orders the said Col Mordecai Buckner, forthwith to depart the American Army.

Capt. John Chilton, who sat on the court martial, opined that "there was but a single circumstance that saved him being shot." Buckner left the army on 9 February 1777 and Hendricks succeeded him as acting commander. During his life Buckner amassed considerable wealth, but he lost much of it by the time he died around 1787. His will was proven on 1 January 1788. He and his wife had two surviving children, John Chew (1770–1820) and Baldwin Matthews (20 April 1772–27 December 1827). Baldwin was born at the family estate at Roxbury in Spotsylvania County and died at Chestnut Hill in Greene County, Virginia.
