= 9th Virginia Regiment =

- Active: 1775–1779
- Allegiance: Continental Congress
- Type: Infantry
- Engagements: Battle of Brandywine, Battle of Germantown

Commanders
- Notable commanders: Colonel Thomas Fleming [Died before March 22, 1777]; Colonel George Mathews

The 9th Virginia Regiment was authorized in the Virginia State Troops on January 11, 1776. It was subsequently organized between February 5 and March 16, 1776, and comprised seven companies of troops from easternmost Virginia. The unit was adopted into the Continental Army on May 31, 1776. The regiment took part in the Battle of Brandywine and the Battle of Germantown. At Germantown, under the command of Colonel George Mathews, the unit penetrated so deeply into the British lines that it was isolated from the remainder of General Nathanael Greene's division and over 400 men were taken prisoner by the British. Four retreating companies of the 1st British Light Infantry Battalion found themselves in the rear of the Virginians and attacked. Surprised, the 9th was driven further into the British camp where it was beset by the brigade of Charles Grey, 1st Earl Grey and the 2nd British Light Infantry Battalion. After being attacked on all sides and Mathews wounded, the regiment surrendered near Kelly's Hill together with part of the 6th Virginia Regiment. The unit was consolidated with the 1st Virginia Regiment on May 12, 1779, and the consolidated unit was designated as the 1st Virginia Regiment. The unit was captured on May 12, 1780, by the British Army at the Siege of Charleston and was disbanded on November 15, 1783.
