= 13th Pennsylvania Regiment =

Continental Army infantry regiment

- Active: 1776–1778
- Allegiance: (United States) Continental Congress
- Type: Infantry
- Size: 728 soldiers
- Part of: Pennsylvania Line
- Engagements: Battle of Trenton; Battle of Princeton; Battle of Brandywine; Battle of Germantown; Battle of Monmouth

Commanders
- Notable commanders: Colonel Samuel Miles; Colonel Walter Stewart

The 13th Pennsylvania Regiment, also known as The Pennsylvania State Rifle Regiment and Miles's Regiment, was raised March 6, 1776, as a state militia regiment and later for service with the Continental Army. The regiment would see action during the New York Campaign, Battle of Trenton, Battle of Princeton, Battle of Brandywine, Battle of Germantown and the Battle of Monmouth. The regiment was merged into the 2nd Pennsylvania Regiment on July 1, 1778.

== History ==
The 13th Pennsylvania Regiment of the Continental Army had its beginnings in the Pennsylvania State Regiment, which was formed via the merging of the Pennsylvania State Battalion of Musketry and the Pennsylvania State Rifle Regiment (also known as "Miles's Regiment"), which had been "formed for the defense of Pennsylvania proper," according to historian John B. B. Trussell. The latter of those two regiments had been named after Samuel Miles, who had been appointed as its commanding officer on March 3, 1776.

According to Trussell, on "October 5, 1776, the Pennsylvania Council of Safety took the first step toward consolidating the remnants of Miles's Regiment and Atlee's Battalion by asking Lieutenant Colonel Brodhead to supply lists of those of his officers who desired to join the Continental Army and those who wanted to remain in the service of the State." The Pennsylvania Council of Safety then announced (on October 25) which companies of the battalion and regiment would make up a new regiment, the Pennsylvania State Regiment. Composed of eight musketry and two rifle units, that regiment was initially commanded by Colonel John Bull until protests by members of their regiment forced state leaders to replace him with Colonel Walter Stewart. Following the addition of an eleventh company "to guard powder mills," the regiment's transfer to the Continental Army was finalized on June 10, 1777. Before a month had passed, the regiment was being referred to as the 13th Pennsylvania Regiment.

== Notable members ==
Samuel Miles was the regiment's commanding officer when he was captured at the Battle of Long Island. On 17 June 1777, Walter Stewart became the unit's commander and led it at the Battle of Brandywine where it fought with George Weedon's 2nd Virginia Brigade.

Muncy resident John Robb (c.1733–1804), who had been appointed second lieutenant in Miles's regiment in March 1776, was commissioned as a captain in the 13th Pennsylvania Regiment on April 18, 1777. John George Hoffner (1735–1799), who had joined Miles's regiment as a sergeant in May 1776 and had been promoted to ensign the following fall, was appointed first lieutenant with the 13th Pennsylvania in March 1777, and then commissioned as a captain at the end of that same year. Sunbury resident Jacob Snider (c.1755–1791), was appointed as a sergeant in Miles's regiment in March 1776 and then later made an ensign before becoming a captain in the 13th Pennsylvania on April 18, 1777.
