= 11th Virginia Regiment =

- Active: 1777–1779
- Allegiance: Continental Congress of the United States
- Type: Infantry
- Part of: Virginia Line
- Engagements: American Revolutionary War: Battle of Brandywine; Battle of Germantown; Battle of Monmouth; Siege of Charleston

Commanders
- Notable commanders: Col. Daniel Morgan and Lt. Col. Christian Febiger (acting commander during Morgan's attachment to the Provisional Rifle Corps from mid-1777 to mid-1778)

The 11th Virginia Regiment was a Continental Army regiment that fought in the American Revolutionary War.

Authorized by the Second Continental Congress on 16 September 1776, it was organized on 3 February 1777 and consisted of four companies from the Virginia counties of Loudoun, Frederick, Prince William, and Amelia; Captain Daniel Morgan's Independent Rifle Company from Fauquier County; and five companies from the state's portion of the Maryland and Virginia Rifle Regiment.

On 15 April 1777 Captain George Price's company (organized on 18 January 1777 in the Virginia State Troops with volunteers from Frederick and Augusta Counties) was transferred to the regiment. On 11 May 1777 the regiment was assigned to the 3rd Virginia Brigade of the Main Army and was reorganized to eight companies on 1 November 1777. The regiment saw action at the Battle of Brandywine, Battle of Germantown, and the Battle of Monmouth. The unit was reassigned to the 2nd Virginia Brigade on 22 July 1778, and it was reorganized to nine companies and redesignated as the 7th Virginia Regiment on 12 May 1779. It was relieved from the 2nd Virginia Brigade on 4 December 1779 and assigned to the Southern Department.

The unit was captured on 12 May 1780 at the Siege of Charleston and subsequently disbanded on 1 January 1781.

John Marshall served as a Lieutenant in the regiment from 1776 until 1780.

== See also ==
- Virginia Line
- 11th Virginia Infantry (Civil War unit)
