= 10th Virginia Regiment =

- Active: 1775–1783
- Allegiance: Continental Congress of the United States
- Type: Infantry
- Size: 728 soldiers
- Part of: Virginia Line
- Engagements: American Revolutionary War: Battle of Brandywine; Battle of Germantown; Monmouth; Siege of Charleston

The 10th Virginia Regiment was raised on December 28, 1775, in western Virginia for service with the Continental Army. The regiment saw action at the Battle of Brandywine, Battle of Germantown, Battle of Monmouth and the Siege of Charleston. Most of the regiment was captured at Charlestown, South Carolina, on May 12, 1780, by the British and the regiment was formally disbanded on November 15, 1783.
