= William Woodford =

American Revolutionary War general (1734–1780)

Delegate Third Virginia Convention
- In office 1775–1775

Personal details
- Born: October 6, 1734 Caroline County, Virginia Colony
- Died: November 13, 1780 (aged 46) New York City, Province of New York
- Spouse: Mary Thornton
- Children: John Thornton Woodford
- Profession: Soldier, planter

Military service
- Allegiance: Kingdom of Great Britain; United States
- Branch/service: Virginia Regiment (Virginia Colonial Militia); Continental Army
- Years of service: 1761–1780
- Rank: ensign, captain, colonel, Brigadier general
- Commands: 2nd Virginia Regiment, Virginia State Forces
- Battles/wars: French and Indian War; Cherokee Expedition; American Revolutionary War; Battle of Great Bridge; Battle of Brandywine (WIA); Battle of Monmouth; Siege of Charleston (POW)

William Woodford (October 6, 1734 – November 13, 1780) was a Virginia planter and militia officer who distinguished himself in the French and Indian War before becoming a general of the 2nd Virginia Regiment in the American Revolutionary War. He was captured at the Siege of Charleston, South Carolina and died of disease in New York City about six months later aboard a British prison ship.

== Early life ==
William Woodford was born in Caroline County, Virginia Colony, in present-day Woodford. His father, Major William Woodford, may have emigrated to Essex County, Virginia by 1700 and became one of Governor Spotswood's Knights of the Golden Horseshoe. His grandfather, Dr. William Cocke, served Virginia as the Secretary of the Colony and a member of the governor's Council under Governor Spotswood. Woodford's great uncle was Mark Catesby, a famous English naturalist.

He married Mary Thornton, daughter of Col. John Thornton. She survived him by decades, dying in 1828. His wife's grandmother, Mildred Washington Gregory, was George Washington's aunt and godmother. They had a son, John Thornton Woodford (1765-1845), who married and had children. He served in the Virginia House of Delegates beginning in 1802, but his descendants moved to Kentucky.

== French and Indian War ==
During the war, Woodford served as an ensign in Colonel George Washington's Virginia Regiment, and was later promoted to lieutenant in 1761. He served in the Cherokee Expedition, under William Byrd and Adam Stephen.

== American Revolutionary War ==
Cannon display in the visitor center on Combs Hill at the Monmouth Battlefield

As war with Great Britain loomed, William Woodford was a delegate to the Third Virginia Convention. He there accepted a commission as colonel in command of the 2nd Virginia Regiment, of the Virginia provisional forces. Having fortified a passage across the Elizabeth River on the border of the Dismal Swamp leading into Norfolk, Woodford's forces drove the royal governor, Lord Dunmore, from the Norfolk peninsula in the Battle of Great Bridge on December 9, 1775. No Virginians died in the first significant battle of the Revolution on Virginia soil, although the Tory forces had 45 casualties.

Later in December 1776, the 2d Virginia Regiment was ordered to join Washington's main army in New Jersey. It became part of the Virginia Line of the Continental Army. William Woodford was promoted to brigadier general in February 1777. Woodford was wounded in September 1777 at the Battle of Brandywine, where he and his troops performed well. Recovering by June 28, 1778, Woodford led his brigade at the Battle of Monmouth, where, under the command of Nathanael Greene, he took control of a rise known as Combs Hill and was able to pound the British left flank with artillery.

In late 1779, Woodford and his brigade were sent to join the Southern Continental Army and fought at the Siege of Charleston, where he and his unit were captured in May 1780.

== Death and legacy ==
Coat of Arms of William Woodford

The British sent their prisoner William Woodford to New York City, where he died of disease, on board a British prison ship, on November 13, 1780. Woodford was buried with military honors at Trinity Church in Manhattan.

In the 1787 Virginia tax census, either his estate or his very young grandson, also William Woodford (1787-1831), was taxed for two horses, and his widow Mary Woodford was taxed for 10 adult and 15 younger slaves, as well as six horses, 19 cattle and a 4-wheeled chariot. Their son John Woodford would serve in the Virginia House of Delegates beginning in 1802.

Two counties in the United States were named in his honor: Woodford County, Illinois, and Woodford County, Kentucky.
