= 1st Virginia Regiment =

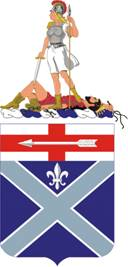
- 1st Virginia Regiment signal
- Active: 1775–1783
- Allegiance: (United States) Continental Congress
- Type: Infantry
- Size: 8 to 10 companies
- Part of: Virginia Line
- Engagements: Battle of Great Bridge, New York Campaign, Battle of Trenton, Battle of Princeton, Battle of Brandywine, Battle of Germantown, Battle of Monmouth, Battle of Stony Point, Siege of Charleston.

Commanders
- Notable commanders: Colonel Patrick Henry; Colonel James Read; Colonel James Hendricks; Colonel Richard Parker †; Colonel William Davis

The 1st Virginia Regiment was an infantry regiment of the Virginia Line that served with the Continental Army during the American Revolutionary War.

== History ==
=== Origins ===
The regiment originated from the Charles City-Henrico County Regiment of Militia founded in 1652. During the French and Indian War, the Virginia Regiment was organized and was the only colonial regiment incorporated into the British line (1754-1763) and saw action at the Battle of Jumonville Glen, Fort Necessity, and the Braddock and Forbes expeditions. Its most notable Commander was Colonel George Washington.

=== Involvement in American Revolutionary War ===
With the heightened political tensions of the 1770s, the regiment was raised again, on July 17, 1775, at Williamsburg, Virginia. As the primary state militia unit, the Virginia regiment later saw service with the (U.S.) Continental Army. The regiment saw action at the Battle of Great Bridge, New York Campaign, Battle of Trenton, Battle of Princeton, Battle of Brandywine, Battle of Germantown, Battle of Monmouth, Battle of Stony Point and the Siege of Charleston. Most of the regiment was captured at Charlestown, South Carolina, on May 12, 1780, by the British and the regiment was formally disbanded on November 15, 1783.

=== Later years ===
During the Mexican American War 1846–1848, the 19th regiment of the Virginia Militia was mustered into Federal Service and renamed the 1st Virginia Volunteers. However, this regiment did not have the regimental lineage of the original Virginia Regiment, but was instead descended from the Richmond City Regiment. During the American Civil War (1861-1865) there was a 1st Virginia Infantry raised in the Confederate Army, but disbanded after the war. Today the 276th Engineer Battalion (United States) of the Virginia National Guard maintains the regimental lineage of the 1st Virginia Volunteers. The regimental lineage of the Colonial, the French and Indian War, and the American Revolution 1st Virginia Regiment is maintained in the Department of Military Affairs by the Office of the State Adjutant General of the Commonwealth of Virginia, in the Virginia Defense Force.

== See also ==
- Virginia Line
