= 14th Virginia Regiment =

- Active: 1776–1780
- Allegiance: Continental Congress of the United States
- Type: Infantry
- Size: 728 soldiers
- Part of: Virginia Line
- Engagements: Battle of Brandywine, Battle of Germantown, Battle of Monmouth, Siege of Charleston.

Commanders
- Notable commanders: Colonel Charles Lewis; Colonel William Davies

The 14th Virginia Regiment was raised on September 16, 1776, in western Virginia for service with the Continental Army. The regiment would see action at the Battle of Brandywine, Battle of Germantown, Battle of Monmouth, and Siege of Charleston. Most of the regiment was captured at Charlestown, South Carolina, on May 12, 1780, by the British Army. The regiment was formally disbanded on November 15, 1783.
