= 12th Virginia Regiment =

United States military unit lasting from 1776 to 1783

- Active: 1776–1780
- Allegiance: Continental Congress of the United States
- Type: Infantry
- Size: 728 soldiers
- Part of: Virginia Line
- Engagements: Battle of Brandywine, Battle of Germantown, Monmouth, Siege of Charleston.

The 12th Virginia Regiment was raised on September 16, 1776, at Williamsburg, Virginia, for service with the (U.S.) Continental Army. The regiment saw action in the Battle of Brandywine, Battle of Germantown, Battle of Monmouth and the Siege of Charleston. Most of the regiment was captured at Charlestown, South Carolina, on May 12, 1780, by the British and the regiment was formally disbanded on January 1, 1783.

From at least October 1777 until June 1778, the 12th Virginia Regiment was under the command of Colonel James Wood and contained companies under the command of the following captains:

October 1777 12th Virginia Regiment Company Commanders Captain Andrew Waggoner Captain Steven Ashby Captain Michael Bowyer Captain Thomas Bowyer Captain Rowland Madison Captain William Vause Captain Andrew Wallace Captain Samuel Lapsley Captain Joseph Mitchel Captain Johnathan Langdon

November 1777 12th Virginia Regiment Company Commanders Captain Andrew Waggoner Captain Steven Ashby Captain Michael Bowyer Captain Thomas Bowyer Captain Rowland Madison Captain William Vause Captain Andrew Wallace Captain Samuel Lapsley Captain Joseph Mitchel Captain Johnathan Langdon

December 1777 12th Virginia Regiment Company Commanders Captain Andrew Waggoner Captain Steven Ashby Captain Michael Bowyer Captain Thomas Bowyer Captain Benjamin Casey Captain Rowland Madison Captain William Vause Captain Andrew Wallace Captain Samuel Lapsley

January 1778 12th Virginia Regiment Company Commanders Captain Andrew Waggoner Captain Steven Ashby Captain Michael Bowyer Captain Thomas Bowyer Captain Benjamin Casey Captain Rowland Madison Captain William Vause Captain Andrew Wallace Captain Samuel Lapsley

February 1778 12th Virginia Regiment Company Commanders Captain Andrew Waggoner Captain Steven Ashby Captain Michael Bowyer Captain Thomas Bowyer Captain Benjamin Casey Captain Rowland Madison Captain William Vause Captain Andrew Wallace Captain Samuel Lapsley

March 1778 12th Virginia Regiment Company Commanders Captain Andrew Waggoner Captain Steven Ashby Captain Michael Bowyer Captain Thomas Bowyer Captain Benjamin Casey Captain Rowland Madison Captain William Vause Captain Andrew Wallace Captain Samuel Lapsley

April 1778 12th Virginia Regiment Company Commanders Captain Andrew Waggoner Captain Steven Ashby Captain Michael Bowyer Captain Thomas Bowyer Captain Benjamin Casey Captain Rowland Madison Captain William Vause Captain Andrew Wallace Captain Samuel Lapsley

May 1778 12th Virginia Regiment Company Commanders Captain Andrew Waggoner Captain Steven Ashby Captain Michael Bowyer Captain Thomas Bowyer Captain Benjamin Casey Captain Rowland Madison Captain William Vause Captain Andrew Wallace Captain Samuel Lapsley
