= 6th Virginia Regiment =

- Active: 1775–1779
- Allegiance: Continental Congress of the United States
- Type: Infantry
- Engagements: Battle of Trenton (1776); Battle of Princeton (1777); Battle of Brandywine (1777); Battle of Germantown (1777); Battle of Monmouth (1778)

Commanders
- Notable commanders: Colonel Mordecai Buckner; Colonel John Gibson; Colonel John Green

The 6th Virginia Regiment was raised on December 28, 1775, at Williamsburg, Virginia, for service with the Continental Army. The regiment would see action at the Battle of Trenton, Battle of Princeton, Battle of Brandywine, Battle of Germantown, Battle of Monmouth and the Siege of Charleston. The regiment was merged into the 2nd Virginia Regiment on May 12, 1779.
