= 4th Virginia Regiment =

- Active: 1775–1783
- Type: Infantry
- Part of: Virginia Line
- Engagements: Battle of Trenton, Battle of Princeton, Battle of Brandywine, Battle of Germantown, Battle of Monmouth, Siege of Charleston

The 4th Virginia Regiment was raised on December 28, 1775, at Suffolk Court House, Virginia, for service with the Continental Army. The regiment saw action at the Battle of Trenton, Battle of Princeton, Battle of Brandywine, Battle of Germantown, Battle of Monmouth and the Siege of Charleston. Most of the regiment was captured at Charlestown, South Carolina, on May 12, 1780, by the British and the regiment was formally disbanded on January 1, 1783.
