= 2nd Virginia Regiment =

- Active: 1775–1783
- Part of: Virginia Line
- Engagements: American Revolutionary War

Commanders
- Notable commanders: Colonel William Woodford; Colonel Alexander Spotswood

The 2d Virginia Regiment (the spelling most commonly used in period references) was authorized by the Virginia Convention, July 17, 1775, as a force of regular troops for the Commonwealth's defense. It consisted of seven companies, 476 privates and the usual regimental officers. William Woodford, of Caroline County, named colonel, along with Lieutenant Colonel Charles Scott and Major Alexander Spotswood were the regiment's initial field officers. Virginia had been divided into 16 military districts which took their names from the predominant county in the grouping; for instance, Prince William District included Fairfax and Loudoun Counties as well. Col. Gregory Smith 1777-78 Col Brent 1779 (Valley Forge ?)

== Officers ==
- 1st Company - Captain George Johns(t)on, September 21, 1775. Raised in Prince William District
- 2nd Company - Captain George Nicholas, Captain Thomas Bressie Co. B September 28, 1775. Raised in Hanover District. Captain William Taliaferro, December 1778
- 3rd Company - Captain Richard Parker, September 28, 1775. Raised in Westmoreland District
- 4th Company - Captain William Taliaferro, September 29, 1775. Raised in Caroline District
- 5th Company - Captain William Fontaine, October 21, 1775. Raised in Amelia District
- 6th Company - Captain Richard Kidder Meade, October 24, 1775. Raised in Southampton District
- 7th Company - Captain Morgan Alexander, November 27, 1775. Raised in Frederick District (Riflemen)

On December 1, 1775, three companies of sixty men each were added to the regiment.

- 8th Company - Captain Buller Claiborne, January 31, 1776. Raised in Prince George District and Petersburg.
- 9th Company - Captain Samuel Hawes, February 19, 1776. Raised in Caroline District.
- 10th Company - Captain Wood Jones, March 8, 1776. Raised in Amelia District and Williamsburg.

== Southern theater 1775–1776 ==
While Colonel Patrick Henry of the 1st Virginia Regiment was technically the commander-in-chief of Virginia's forces, correspondence between the President of Virginia's Committee of Safety Edmund Pendleton and Colonel Woodford indicates that this was a political decision in recognition of Henry's efforts prior to the outbreak of hostilities. While Henry was a politician, Woodford had served in the French and Indian War and had real military experience. For this reason, Pendleton decided to keep Henry in Williamsburg, Virginia, while dispatching the 2d Virginia Regiment to meet Governor Dunmore's small "army" composed of detachments of the 14th Regiment of Foot, naval gunners, and freed slaves who had been formed into the Ethiopian Regiment.

The 2d Virginia Regiment, along with elements of the Culpeper Minutemen, engaged the British at the Battle of Great Bridge (modern day Chesapeake Virginia), which was a decisive victory. Colonel William Woodford, reporting on the 2d Virginia Regiment's Service at the Battle of Great Bridge, wrote in a letter published in Purdie's Virginia Gazette, December 15, 1775: "This was a second Bunker's Hill affair, in miniature; with this difference, that we kept our post, and had only one man wounded in the hand."

Minor fighting would continue in Hampton and Norfolk, including the burning of Norfolk, which at the time was not only Virginia's largest city, but also a Loyalist stronghold. Originally raised for one year's state service, the 2d Virginia was accepted by Congress for Continental service on February 13, 1776, and reorganized at Suffolk as part of the Continental Army.

Dunmore would remove his force to Gywnn's Island, a small island where the Rappahannock River meets the Chesapeake Bay, where they would stay for several months along with a small flotilla of Royal Navy and loyalist ships. By July 1776, Virginia had expanded its forces to include several more infantry regiments and an artillery regiment under the command of General Andrew Lewis. The Virginia forces, including the 2d Virginia Regiment, would bombard Dunmore's position from a shore battery before launching an amphibious assault on the island. By the time the Virginians made it ashore, Dunmore's force withdrew to its ships and sailed away. They would raid Stafford County in late July 1776 before sailing for New York City.

== Philadelphia campaign, 1777–1778 ==
In December 1776, the 2d Virginia Regiment was ordered to join Washington's Main Army in New Jersey. Colonel Woodford was promoted to brigadier general and Alexander Spottswood became colonel of the 2d Virginia Regiment on February 21, 1777. The regiment marched to Baltimore, Maryland, where it was equipped and then dispatched to Maryland's Eastern Shore to suppress local Loyalists, before making their way to Philadelphia for clothing, and finally joined the Main Army as part of Weedon's Brigade in Greene's Division.

In August 1777, Washington marched his army to counter the British landing at Head of Elk, Maryland, with the objective of Philadelphia. A detachment of the 2d Virginia Regiment fought as part of Maxwell's Light Corps, a provisional formation made up of drafts of 100 men from each brigade, under Lt. Colonel Richard Parker at the battle of Cooch's Bridge on September 3, 1777. Greene's Division of Virginians had held off the British advance at the closing of the Battle of Brandywine, allowing the rest of the army to withdraw in good order. They were in the thick of confusion at the Battle of Germantown, so thick in fact that the 9th Virginia Regiment of Mulenburgh's Brigade fought with such success that it found itself cut off and captured to a man. Stephen's Brigade was engaged in an embarrassing example of "friendly fire" with Wayne's Brigade as they too had to retreat after pressing so much further than the Pennsylvanians mistook them for the British in the fog of battle because of the direction they were coming from.

The 2d Virginia Regiment again served with distinction, as reflected in the Virginia Gazette, October 17, 1777: "The heroism and gallantry of the second Virginia regiment I cannot help particularly mentioning; they would do honour to any country in the world. It is universally believed they behaved the best of any troops in the field." Colonel Spotswood resigned after the Battle of Germantown to return to Virginia to take care of the family as he mistakenly thought his brother had been killed (he had in fact been wounded and captured). He was replaced by Colonel Christian Febiger, a Danish-born officer, who would command the regiment the rest of its existence. The 2d Virginia Regiment entered winter quarters at Valley Forge, emerging in June 1778 to fight at the Battle of Monmouth on June 28, 1778.

The Philadelphia Campaign had left the Virginia Line in shambles, depleting both men and supplies. On September 14, 1778, the 2d Virginia Regiment is officially consolidated with the 6th Virginia Regiment to make a "new" 2nd Virginia Regiment. Colonel Febiger retains his command and Lt. Colonel Simms of the 6th Virginia Regiment becomes his new second in command. Even with this new consolidation, the regiments were understrength, and from this point forward would never operate as a "regiment" again. While encamped around New York City in both the Hudson Highlands and Northern New Jersey, officers deemed supernumerary were given new assignments (while officially holding their prior titles) and parties of men would be assigned duties under various captains. A return written by Inspector General Steuben indicates that the regiment only had 180 rank and file, which could form two divisions. It was decided that it would brigade with the 5th and 11th Virginia Regiments to "compose a Battalion" and that these three regiments would "furnish 61 Men for the Light Infantry".

This light infantry "company" would be attached to Wayne's Corps of Light Infantry and took part in the storming of Stony Point in July 1779. Colonel Febiger would be one of these "supernumerary" officers and was assigned to command one of the composite battalions of light infantry in this attack. A month later, Captain Catlett and 50 men of the regiment would be under "Light Horse Harry" Lee at Paulus Hook (present day Jersey City) and was credited with covering the retreat from capturing this post.

At this point, regimental history becomes very confusing to track. Given the number of men fit for duty, these "regiments" are not really "regiments" at all any more, yet they are still named as such. In 1780, the word "Detachment" comes into use, describing a 700-man conglomeration of these "regiments" – larger than a regiment or battalion, smaller than a division. Colonel Febiger is sent to Philadelphia to arrange supplies for the Southern Army and then onto Virginia for recruiting. Three detachments are made out of recruits in Virginia and the remaining Virginia Continentals outside of New York City. The 2d Virginia Detachment is formed out of various regiments under the 2d Virginia Regiment's original colonel, Brigadier General William Woodford, including elements of the 2d Virginia Regiment and Lt. Colonel Gustavus Brown Wallace, Major Charles Pelham, Captains Alexander Parker and Benjamin Taliaferro can be placed with this detachment. The 3rd Virginia Detachment would be formed under Colonel Abraham Buford and was composed of elements of the 7th Virginia, as well as various pieces of other units, including two companies of the 2nd, Capt. Alexander Parker's and Capt. Thomas Catlett's. It is known that Captains Francis Cowherd and John Stokes were also with this detachment.

== Southern theater 1780 ==
The 1st and 2d Virginia Detachments were sent to Charlestown, South Carolina, where they were captured with the surrender of the town on May 12, 1780. The 3rd Virginia Detachment, delayed in marching, was also sent to Charleston, but as Buford approached the city, he learned of its fall and began a march to Hillsborough, NC. Lt. Colonel Banastre Tarleton of the British Legion caught up to Buford at Waxhaws, asked for his surrender, and when it was not given, cut the 3rd Virginia Detachment to pieces. Captain Stokes would receive several cuts to the face and Captain Catlett was killed. Captain Alexander Parker escaped what Americans later termed a "massacre" and made it back to Virginia.

Some stragglers would make it back to Chesterfield Courthouse, south of Richmond, where Colonel Christian Febiger was now in charge of the recruiting effort to raise new Virginia Continental regiments. These men would find themselves in new Virginia regiments including two regiments of 18-month levies raised in December 1780 under Colonel John Green and Lt. Colonel Samuel Hawes (former captain of the 2d Virginia Regiment in 1775) which would eventually be named the 1st and 2d Virginia Regiments, as well as a Continental regiment technically commanded by Colonel Febiger, but operationally in the field commanded by Lt. Colonel Thomas Gaskins. The "new" 1st and 2d Virginia Regiments would fight with General Nathanael Greene's army in the Carolinas at the Battle of Guilford Court House, the siege of Ninety-Six, Battle of Hobkirk's Hill, and Battle of Eutaw Springs. Gaskins' Battalion would be assigned to a Continental detachment under General Lafayette during the Virginia Campaign in 1781, and later the Main Army under Washington at Yorktown, but were consistently held in reserve and never saw actual fighting.

The men of Gaskins' Battalion were reorganized in December 1781 under Thomas Posey, another former 2d Virginia Regiment officer, and join General Anthony Wayne's detachment sent south to South Carolina and Georgia. They would see fighting against Loyalists and Indians outside of Savannah at the Battle of Ogeechee Creek in the spring of 1782. They would also be present at the evacuation of Charleston. Some men also were part of a company of Virginia Continentals who survived Charleston and the Waxhaws which fought at the Battle of Cowpens in January 1781. While these officers and men had served in the 2d Virginia Regiment, none of these regiments can officially be tied to the lineage of the original regiment formed in 1775.

The regiment was formally disbanded on November 15, 1783.
