= Battle of Paoli order of battle =

The following units and commanders fought in the Battle of Paoli during the American Revolutionary War. The Battle of Paoli (also known as the Battle of Paoli Tavern or the Paoli Massacre) was part of the Philadelphia campaign of the American Revolutionary War fought on September 21, 1777, in the area surrounding present-day Malvern, Pennsylvania.

== American Army ==
Lincoln's Division
Brigadier General Anthony Wayne

- Brigade Major Michael Ryan

1st Pennsylvania Brigade - Colonel Thomas Hartley

- Brigade Major William Nichols

1st Pennsylvania Regiment, Colonel James Chambers
2nd Pennsylvania Regiment, Major William Williams
7th Pennsylvania Regiment, Lieutenant Colonel David Grier
10th Pennsylvania Regiment, Lieutenant Colonel Adam Hubley
Hartley's Additional Continental Regiment, Lieutenant Colonel Morgan Connor

2nd Pennsylvania Brigade - Colonel Richard Humpton

4th Pennsylvania Regiment, Lieutenant Colonel William Butler
5th Pennsylvania Regiment, Colonel Francis Johnston
8th Pennsylvania Regiment, Colonel Daniel Brodhead
11th Pennsylvania Regiment, Major Francis Mentges

Additional units

Randall's Independent Company of Artillery, Captain Thomas Randall
Count Casimir Pulaski's Corps of Light Dragoons, Major Julius Count Montfort
1st Continental Light Dragoons, Lieutenant Colonel Benjamin Temple
2nd Continental Light Dragoons, Captain Josiah Stoddard

== British Army ==
Main Column
Major General Charles Grey

42nd Regiment of Foot (2 battalions), Lieutenant Colonel Thomas Stirling
44th Regiment of Foot, Major Henry Hope
2nd Battalion of Light Infantry, Major John Maitland
16th (Queen's Own) Light Dragoons (Detachment), Major Francis Gwyn
Company of Light Infantry
Detachment of Riflemen (remnants of Ferguson's Corps of Riflemen)

Detachment
Lieutenant Colonel Thomas Musgrave

40th Regiment of Foot
50th Regiment of Foot

== Sources ==
- McGuire, Thomas J. Battle of Paoli. Stackpole Books, 2000. Mechanicsburg, PA ISBN 0-8117-0198-0
