= 11th Pennsylvania Regiment =

Continental Army infantry regiment

11th Pennsylvania Regiment (Old 11th)
- Active: 1776–1778
- Allegiance: (United States) Continental Congress
- Type: Infantry
- Size: 728 soldiers
- Part of: Pennsylvania Line
- Engagements: Battle of the Assunpink Creek (1777); Battle of Princeton (1777); Battle of Brandywine (1777); Battle of Paoli (1777); Battle of Germantown (1777); Battle of White Marsh (1777); Battle of Monmouth (1778)

Commanders
- Notable commanders: Colonel Richard Humpton

The 11th Pennsylvania Regiment or Old Eleventh was authorized on 16 September 1776 for service with the Continental Army. On 25 October, Richard Humpton was named colonel. In December 1776, the regiment was assigned to George Washington's main army and was present at Assunpink Creek and fought at Princeton in January 1777. During the spring, the unit assembled at Philadelphia, Pennsylvania in a strength of eight companies. The soldiers were recruited from Philadelphia and four nearby counties. On 22 May 1777, the regiment became part of the 2nd Pennsylvania Brigade. The 11th was in the thick of the action at Brandywine, Paoli, and Germantown in 1777. It was present at White Marsh and Monmouth. On 1 July 1778, the unit was consolidated with the 10th Pennsylvania Regiment, and the 11th Regiment ceased to exist. Humpton took command of the reorganized unit.

A new 11th Pennsylvania Regiment was formed in January 1779 by consolidating two "additional" regiments and elements of a third. The New Eleventh served in the Sullivan Expedition in the summer of 1779. The unit existed until January 1781, when it merged with the 3rd Pennsylvania Regiment.

== History ==
=== Princeton ===
The 11th Pennsylvania Regiment came into existence on 16 September 1776. Richard Humpton, a former captain in the British Army and Seven Years' War veteran, was appointed colonel on 25 October. The soldiers hailed from Philadelphia City, Berks, Chester, Philadelphia (now Montgomery), and Northumberland Counties. In the 1776 establishment of a Continental Army infantry regiment, there were three field officers, one colonel, one lieutenant colonel, and one major. The staff included one each of the following: surgeon, surgeon's mate, adjutant, quartermaster, paymaster, sergeant major, quartermaster sergeant, drum major, fife major, and chaplain. Each of the eight line companies included one captain, one first lieutenant, one second lieutenant, one ensign, four sergeants, four corporals, one drummer, one fifer, and 76 privates. The Continental regiment was formidable on paper but typically operated far below its nominal strength. The Pennsylvania infantry company organization of October 1775 was weaker than the Continental standard by one lieutenant, the two musicians, and eight privates. The American infantry regiment was designed to fight in two ranks from its inception.

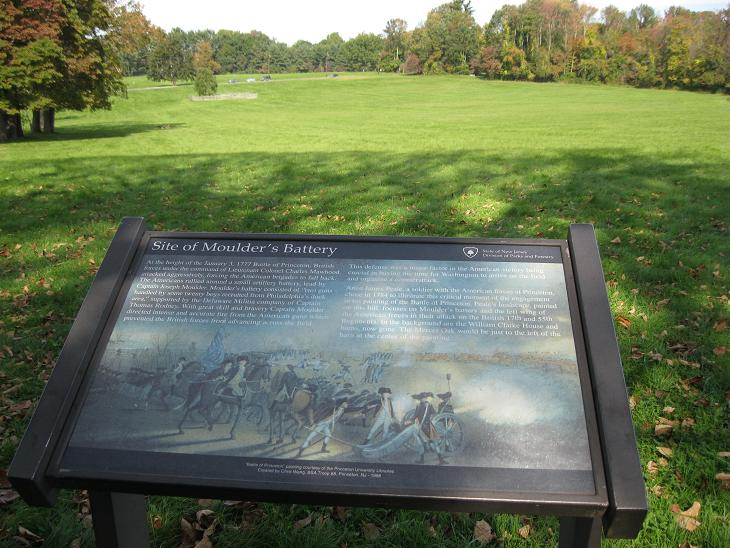
Mifflin's brigade joined other Americans in defending this hill at the Battle of Princeton.

The 11th Pennsylvania Regiment was assigned to the main army on 27 December 1776. Together with the 2nd, 4th, 10th, and 12th Pennsylvania Regiments, the 11th was assigned to Thomas Mifflin's brigade. Since the brigade fielded 1,500 troops, the five regiments averaged around 300 men each. Mifflin's brigade crossed the Delaware River to Burlington, New Jersey on 28 December. By 1 January 1777, Mifflin moved his troops to Bordentown, New Jersey. He joined the main army the next day in time to be present at the Battle of the Assunpink Creek. Mifflin was at George Washington's council of war that evening.

Before the Battle of Princeton on 3 January 1777, the Pennsylvanians made the second-night march in a row with very little sleep, and the soldiers were exhausted. The order of march for John Sullivan's division was a vanguard under Isaac Sherman followed by the brigades of Arthur St. Clair and Mifflin. While Sullivan's column swung to the right, the troops under Nathanael Greene turned to the left, led by 350 men under Hugh Mercer. Charles Mawhood's British 17th Foot and 55th Foot immediately confronted Greene's column. After a firefight, the British charged and routed the American vanguard, mortally wounding Mercer. Mawhood's soldiers advanced toward the Thomas Clark House and hill but were halted by cannon fire from Joseph Moulder's artillery company. As the British attack stalled, Washington patched together a line from the brigades of John Cadwalader, Daniel Hitchcock, Edward Hand, and Mifflin. After exchanging volleys with the British, the Americans finally advanced. Mawhood's outnumbered force resisted but broke ranks and fled.

=== Philadelphia campaign ===
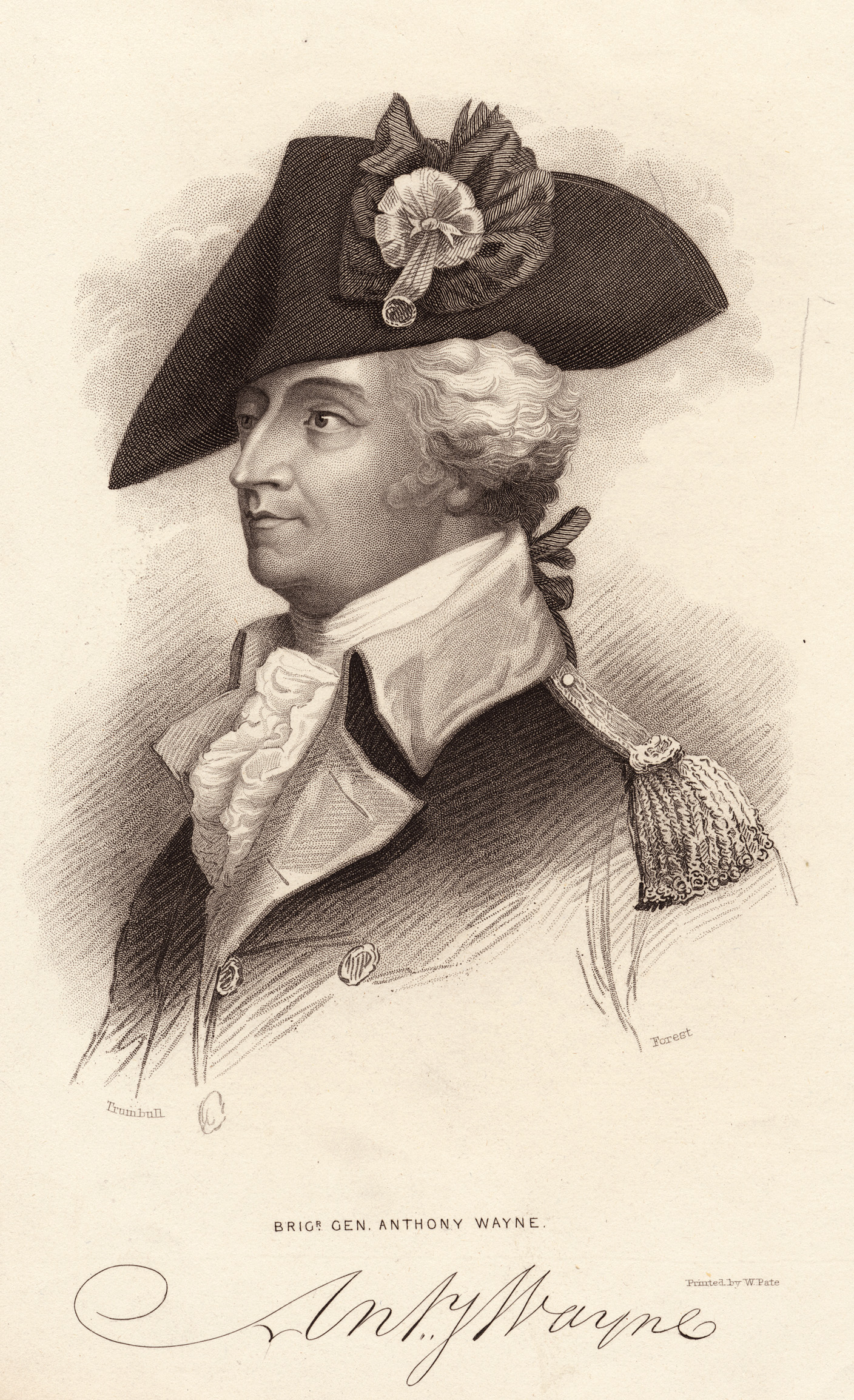
Anthony Wayne

On 22 May 1777, Washington placed the 11th Regiment in the 2nd Pennsylvania Brigade. The other units in the 2nd Brigade were 4th, 5th, and 8th Pennsylvania Regiments. Major General Benjamin Lincoln led the Pennsylvania division. Still, he was later sent on detached duty, and the 1st Pennsylvania Brigade's commander Brigadier General Anthony Wayne led the division in his absence. Brigadier General John Philip De Haas was named commander of the 2nd Pennsylvania Brigade, but he never joined his brigade for reasons that remain unclear to this day.

In De Haas' absence, Humpton led the brigade at the Battle of Brandywine on 11 September 1777. Wayne's 2,000-man division deployed in a single battleline 500 yards (457 m) east of Chadds Ford on Brandywine Creek. The 1st Brigade under temporary commander Thomas Hartley formed on the right while the 2nd Brigade held the left. The 5th Pennsylvania held the extreme left flank, while to its right, in order, were the 11th, 8th, and 4th Pennsylvania Regiments. Wilhelm von Knyphausen's British and Hessians advanced across the creek. They captured Thomas Proctor's artillery redoubt. Wayne's troops held their ground at first, then retired in good order from one position to the next. As darkness fell Wayne withdrew his division to a hill 600 yards (549 m) farther east.

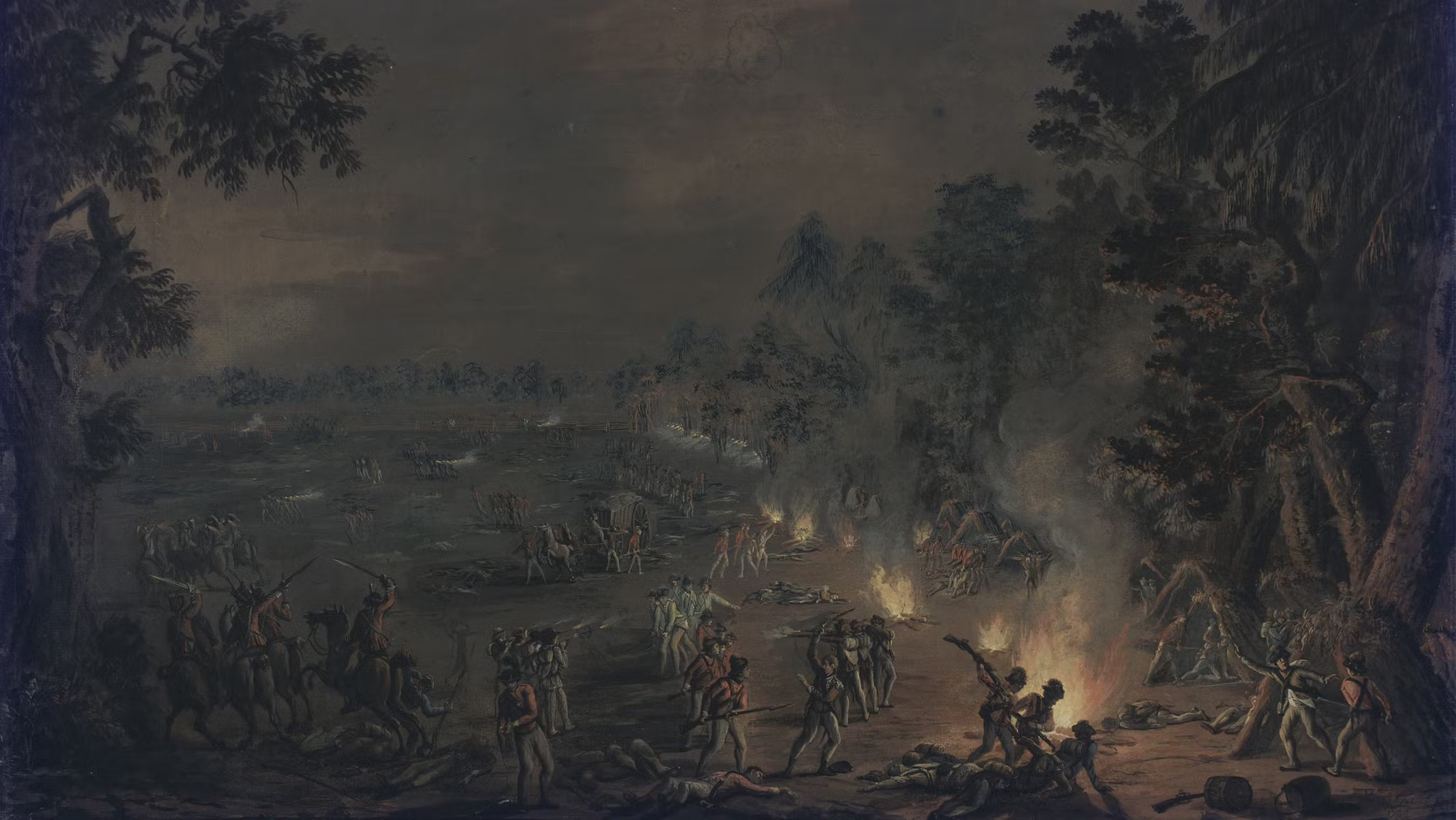
The Battle of Paoli, 21 September 1777

Washington withdrew behind the Schuylkill River with his main army while leaving Wayne's division on the west bank to harry Sir William Howe's British army. On 20 September, Wayne, Humpton, and Hartley scouted Howe's nearby camp. At the same time, Howe directed Charles Grey to conduct a silent night bayonet attack on Wayne's Pennsylvanians. Grey had 1,200 troops, including the 2nd Light Infantry Battalion, 42nd Foot, and 44th Foot. Just after midnight on the 21st, the Battle of Paoli began when an American dragoon alerted the camp, and Wayne ordered his soldiers out of their shelters. A soldier of the 11th Pennsylvania recalled that the soldiers formed in "less than five Minutes". As the British attack overran the pickets, Wayne sent the 1st Pennsylvania Regiment to hold off the British and got his men in motion to the rear. The artillery pulled out first, then the 2nd and 1st Brigades followed. One of the guns broke down, blocking the road, and as the Pennsylvanians waited for the obstruction to be cleared, the British burst through the 1st Regiment and fell on the immobile column with bayonet and sword. Those Americans who survived the slaughter retreated or fled into the night. An approaching body of 2,100 Maryland militia under William Smallwood was also involved in the stampede, and over 1,000 militiamen ran away and never returned. In the Battle of Paoli, the Americans experienced 300 casualties, including 52 dead. British losses were only three dead and eight wounded.

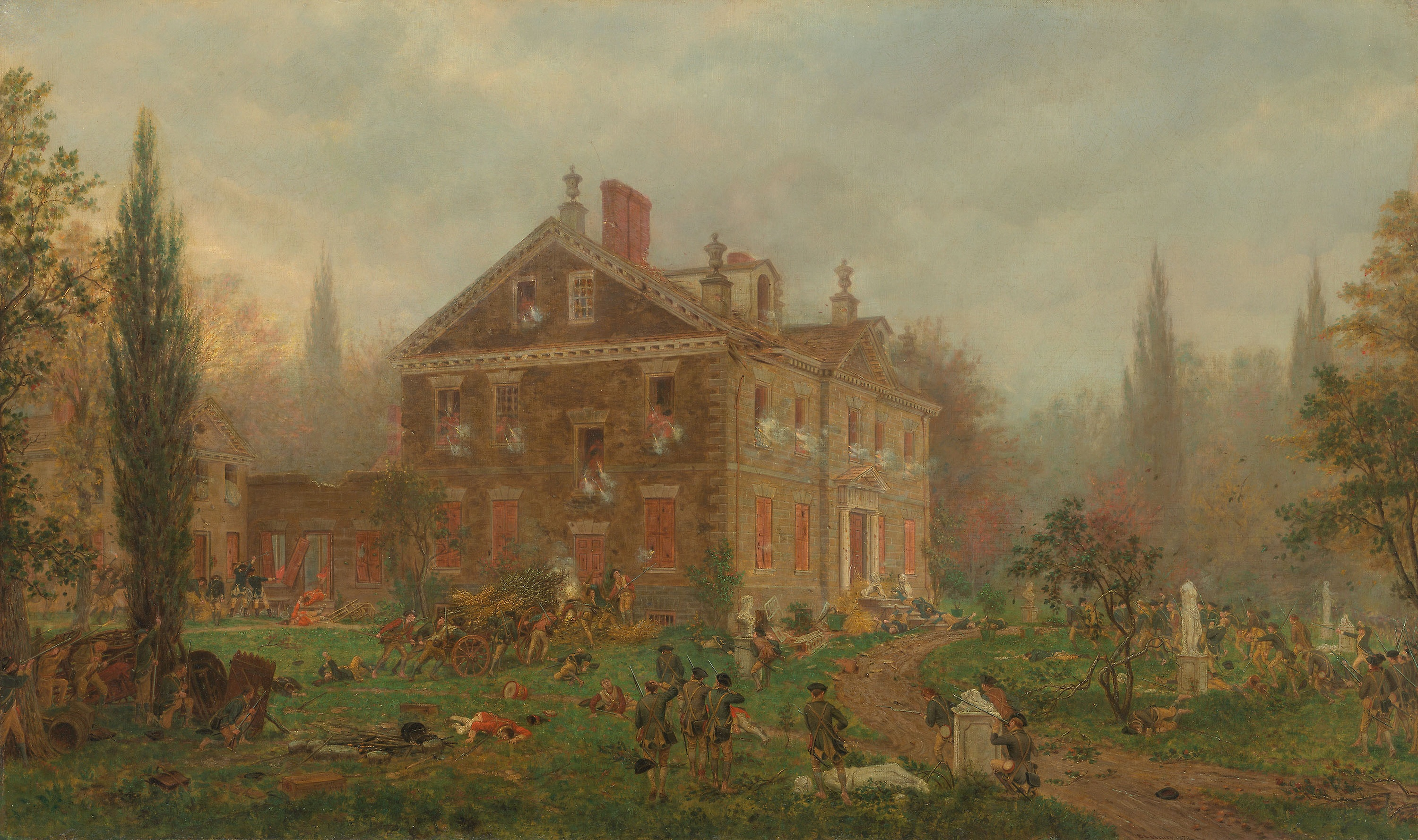
Battle of Germantown, 4 October 1777, fighting at the Chew House

At the Battle of Germantown on 4 October 1777, the 11th Regiment fought in John Sullivan's right column. The attack was led by Thomas Conway's 3rd Pennsylvania Brigade. In the foggy dawn, Conway's men engaged the British 2nd Light Infantry Battalion at Mount Airy. Sullivan fed in his division of two Maryland brigades on the right flank, while Wayne deployed his two brigades on the left of Germantown Road. As at Brandywine, Hartley's 1st Brigade formed on the right, next to the road, while Humpton's 2nd Brigade, including the 11th Regiment, deployed on the left. Faced with their tormentors of Paoli, Wayne's men attacked in a battle frenzy. Set upon by the Pennsylvanians and Marylanders, the 2nd Light Infantry was routed for the first time and suffered the loss of their camp.

A little later, the 5th Foot and 55th Foot arrived at the front, and the 2nd Light Infantry attempted to rally. Sullivan's column overpowered this position and pressed ahead. A British officer in command of a picket of the 46th Foot watched in amazement as the light infantry ran away. Then, the 2nd Pennsylvania Brigade and part of Nathanael Greene's left column also forced his men to flee. As Sullivan's line passed the Benjamin Chew House, 120 men of the 40th Foot took refuge in the building, but the Americans ignored them and pressed onward into the fog. Sullivan shifted Conway's brigade to the right of his Marylanders, and all contact between his troops and Wayne's was lost. Presently, the American reserve arrived before the Chew House. Persuaded by Henry Knox, Washington attacked the structure. Accordingly, two cannons of Proctor's 4th Continental Artillery Regiment and two captured British 6-pound guns began firing at the Chew House. Two New Jersey regiments tried to storm the house to no avail, suffering heavy losses. Completely isolated to the east of Germantown Road and several hundred yards south, Wayne heard the racket, about-faced his division, and started back in the direction of the Chew House. As they moved back, Adam Stephen's Virginia division spotted them in the fog and opened fire. The friendly fire volley ripped into the 2nd Pennsylvania Brigade, whose men returned fire. In the growing confusion, Wayne's men panicked and did not rally until they were 3 miles (4.8 km) from the battlefield. The regiment was present at the Battle of White Marsh from 5 to 8 December 1777, though only light infantry and militia were engaged. At the time the regiment went into winter quarters at Valley Forge, Humpton's field officers were Lieutenant Colonel Caleb North and Major Francis Mentges.

=== Monmouth ===
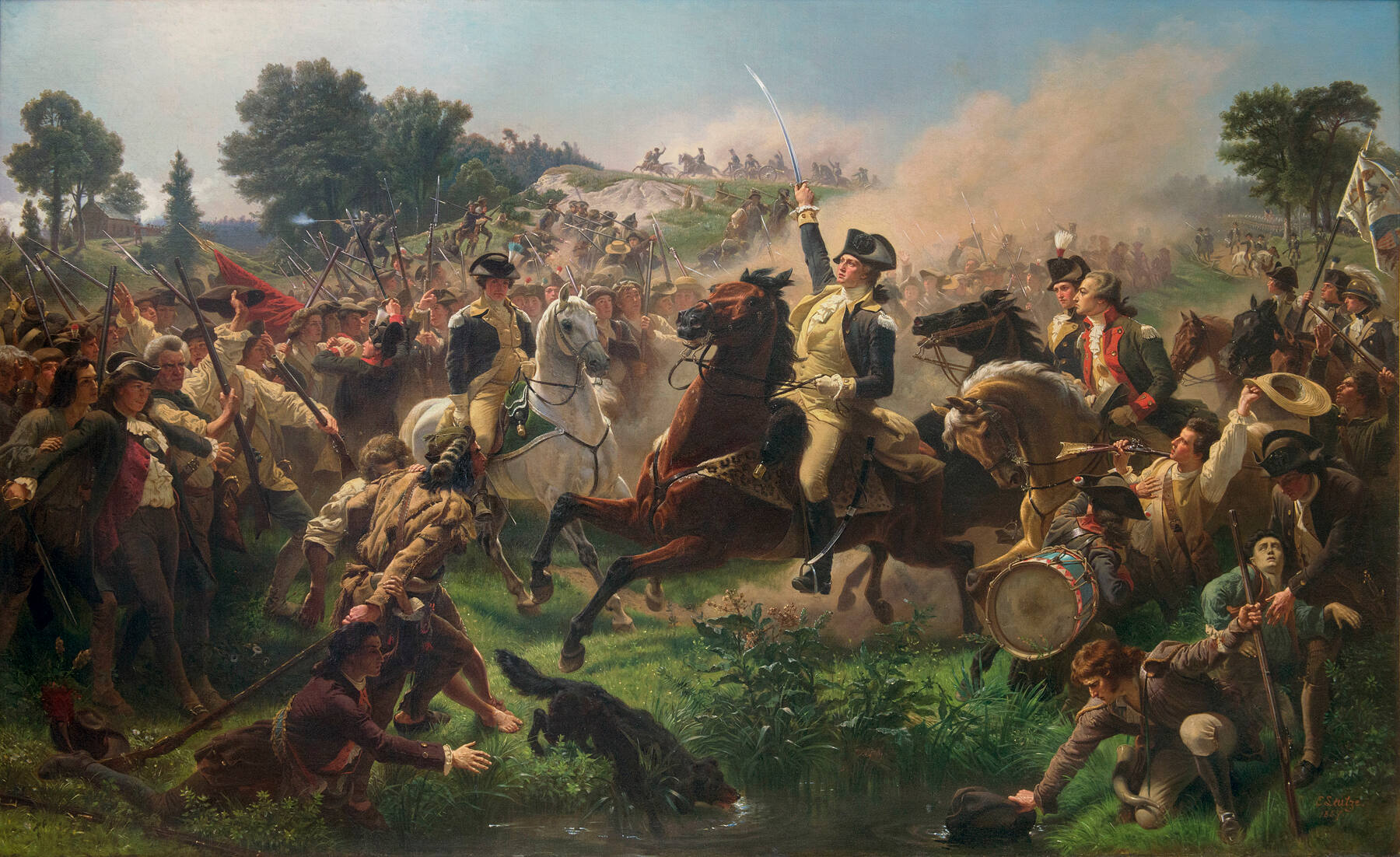
Washington Rallying the Troops at Monmouth by Emanuel Leutze

The 11th Regiment's last action was the Battle of Monmouth on 28 June 1778. On 22 June, Washington ordered each brigade in the army to detach one officer and 25 sharpshooters to join a corps led by Daniel Morgan. On 24 June, Morgan was directed to annoy the right flank and rear of Sir Henry Clinton's retreating British army. Washington also sent a 1,500 detachment of picked men from the entire army under Charles Scott to harass the British left flank. Another 1,000 picked men led by Wayne were sent out on 25 June. The various detachments plus more units were placed under the command of Charles Lee. The 2nd Pennsylvania Brigade under the acting command of Francis Johnston had 53 officers, 13 staff, 115 non-commissioned officers, and 647 privates, or a total strength of 828 men. However, the detachments to Lee's advance guard reduced the brigade's numbers to 35 officers, 51 sergeants, and 401 rank and file, or 487 men. Humpton led the rump of the 11th Pennsylvania. Of the four 360-man detachments under Scott, one was under the leadership of a Pennsylvanian, that of Richard Butler. Of the three 350-man detachments under Wayne, one was under Pennsylvanian Walter Stewart.

The Great Cannonade historical marker on Perrine Hill

At the beginning of the action, Lee's vanguard sparred with the British rear guard but quickly retreated when Clinton advanced at the head of 6,000 men. Units fell back without orders, and Lee was compelled to order a retreat. While elements of Lee's advance guard put in some stiff fighting at a hedgerow around noon, Washington and Lord Stirling deployed the 2nd and 3rd Pennsylvania Brigades, and the brigades of Jedediah Huntington, John Glover, and Ebenezer Learned in line on Perrine Hill. Knox positioned about 12 cannons to brace this position. Both armies then endured a cannonade for two hours. At 2:00 PM, Clinton tried to turn Lord Stirling's left flank with Grey's brigade, but the attempt failed. Clinton began a deliberate withdrawal when an American battery on Combs Hill started to enfilade his lines from the left. After several clashes, the British successfully broke contact and continued their retreat. Almost immediately after the battle, on 1 July, the "Old Eleventh" was merged into the 10th Pennsylvania Regiment. As the senior colonel, Humpton took command of the consolidated regiment.

== New Eleventh ==
On 13 January 1779, a new 11th Pennsylvania Regiment was formed by consolidating several existing units. The bulk of the troops came from Hartley's Additional Continental Regiment and Patton's Additional Continental Regiment. Also, the companies of Captains John Doyle, John Steele, and James Calderwood were transferred from Malcolm's Additional Continental Regiment. The new regiment was organized with nine companies. It was first assigned to the Middle Department. On 9 April 1779, the "New Eleventh" was transferred to Edward Hand's Brigade in the main army. The regiment went on the Sullivan Expedition against the Iroquois in the summer of 1779. On 1 August 1780, the unit became part of the 2nd Pennsylvania Brigade, still in the main army. The new 11th was absorbed by the 3rd Pennsylvania Regiment on 17 January 1781.

== Service record ==
Designation	Date	Brigade	Department
11th Pennsylvania Regiment	16 September 1776	none	none
11th Pennsylvania Regiment	27 December 1776	Mifflin's	Main Army
11th Pennsylvania Regiment	22 May 1777	2nd Pennsylvania	Main Army
11th Pennsylvania Regiment	1 July 1778	2nd Pennsylvania	consolidated

== Bibliography ==
- Boatner, Mark M. III (1994). Encyclopedia of the American Revolution. Mechanicsburg, Pa.: Stackpole Books. ISBN 0-8117-0578-1.
- Fischer, David Hackett (2004). Washington's Crossing. New York, N.Y.: Oxford University Press. ISBN 978-0-19-518159-3.
- Heitman, Francis Bernard (1914). Historical Register of Officers of the Continental Army during the War of the Revolution. Washington, D.C.: Rare Book Shop Publishing Company.
- McGuire, Thomas J. (2006). The Philadelphia Campaign, Volume I. Mechanicsburg, Penn.: Stackpole Books. ISBN 0-8117-0178-6.
- McGuire, Thomas J. (2007). The Philadelphia Campaign, Volume II. Mechanicsburg, Penn.: Stackpole Books. ISBN 0-8117-0206-5.
- Morrissey, Brendan (2008). Monmouth Courthouse 1778: The last great battle in the North. Long Island City, N.Y.: Osprey Publishing. ISBN 978-1-84176-772-7.
- Wright, Robert K. Jr. (1989). The Continental Army. Washington, D.C.: United States Army Center of Military History. CMH Pub 60-4.
