= 8th Pennsylvania Regiment =

Continental Army infantry regiment

- Active: 1776–1781
- Allegiance: (United States) Continental Congress
- Type: Infantry
- Size: 8 to 9 companies
- Part of: Pennsylvania Line
- Engagements: Forage War (1777); Battle of Bound Brook (1777); Battle of Brandywine (1777); Battle of Paoli (1777); Battle of Germantown (1777); Battles of Saratoga (1777) (part); Fort Laurens (1778–1779); Sullivan Expedition (1779)

Commanders
- Notable commanders: Colonel Aeneas Mackay; Colonel Daniel Brodhead

The 8th Pennsylvania Regiment or Mackay's Battalion was an American infantry unit that became part of the Continental Army during the American Revolutionary War. Authorized for frontier defense in July 1776, the eight-company unit was originally called Mackay's Battalion after its commander, Colonel Aeneas Mackay. Transferred to the main army in November 1776, the unit was renamed the 8th Pennsylvania Regiment on 1 January 1777. It completed an epic winter march from western Pennsylvania to New Jersey, though Mackay and his second-in-command both died soon afterward. In March 1777 Colonel Daniel Brodhead assumed command. The regiment was engaged at the Battles of Bound Brook, Brandywine, Paoli, and Germantown in 1777. A body of riflemen were detached from the regiment and fought at Saratoga. Assigned to the Western Department in May 1778, the 8th Pennsylvania gained a ninth company before seeing action near Fort Laurens and in the Sullivan Expedition in 1778 and 1779. The regiment consolidated with the 2nd Pennsylvania Regiment in January 1781 and ceased to exist.

== History ==
=== Frontier defence to New Jersey ===
A frontier defense battalion was authorized by the Continental Congress on 11 July 1776 as part of the Continental Army in the Northern Department. On 20 July the unit was named Mackay's Battalion. The battalion was organized from 15 July to 15 September 1776 at Kittanning, Pennsylvania in the western part of the state to consist of eight companies of infantry - one from Bedford County and Seven from Westmoreland County. Colonel Aeneas Mackay, Lieutenant Colonel George Wilson, and Major Richard Butler were appointed by Congress to lead the battalion. Quartermaster Ephraim Douglass, Commissary Ephraim Blaine, Adjutant Michael Huffnagle, Paymaster John Boyd, and Chaplain David McClure rounded out the staff positions, though McClure never assumed his duties. The eight captains were Moses Carson, Wendel Oury, David Kilgore, Andrew Mann, Samuel Miller, Eliezer Myers, James Piggott, and Van Swearingen. Carson apparently defected to the British during the war. By 16 December 630 men enrolled in the battalion.

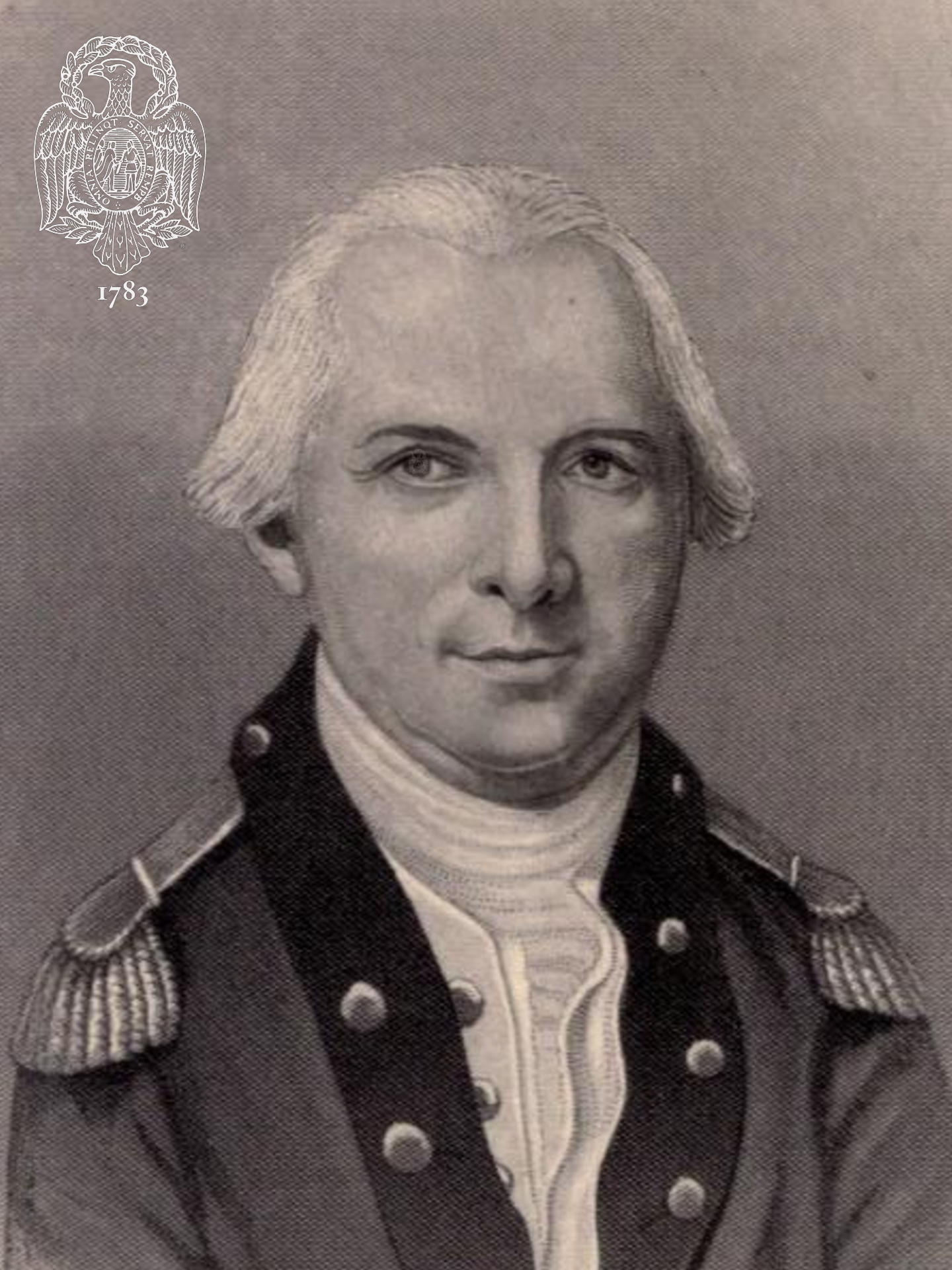
Colonel Daniel Brodhead

The unit was assigned to General George Washington's main army on 23 November 1776. n 4 December 1776 the order arrived from Congress to join the main army in Philadelphia. Not only did the soldiers dislike being called away from their homes, but they also faced a mid-winter march without tents and uniforms. On 1 January 1777 the unit was redesignated the 8th Pennsylvania Regiment. On 6 January the unit began a march of 300 miles (483 km) across the mountains and hills of Pennsylvania, with their supplies on pack horses. A number of men deserted and went home. Their food supply was stretched out by hunting game in the woods. In February the regiment staggered into Quibbletown, New Jersey and went into camp. Within a short time, one-third of the regiment was on the sick list and 50 men died, including both senior officers, Mackay and Wilson. The unit was in action near Rahway, New Jersey on 23 February during the Forage War. In the Battle of Spanktown, the Americans surprised a reinforced British brigade under Charles Mawhood and forced it to withdraw to Amboy. On 27 March Colonel Daniel Brodhead transferred from the 4th Pennsylvania Regiment to take command of the 8th. Butler was promoted to lieutenant colonel and Mackay's son-in-law Stephen Bayard was appointed major.

The 8th Pennsylvania fought at the Battle of Bound Brook on 13 April 1777 under the command of Butler. In this action the 8th formed the main part of a 500-man outpost under the command of Major General Benjamin Lincoln, together with militia and an artillery detachment from the Proctor's Pennsylvania State Artillery Regiment. These troops observed the 8,000 British and Hessian troops in and around Brunswick, New Jersey, only 7 miles (11.3 km) away. On the 13th, Charles Cornwallis attempted to envelop Lincoln's small outpost. Though the password was supposed to have been compromised, surprise was achieved mainly because the American militia pickets were not alert. Cornwallis and Major General James Grant with 3,000 to 4,000 troops marched along both banks of the Raritan River. Colonel Carl von Donop led the center with two Hessian grenadier battalions. Two battalions of British light infantry and one of grenadiers advanced on the left, while the Hessian jägers, Sir George Osborn's grenadier company of the Brigade of Guards, and the light cavalry moved up on the right. The plan miscarried when Captain Johann von Ewald's jäger company was pinned down under "murderous fire" and Donop's troops were committed before the enveloping columns could get behind the Americans. Lincoln's men fought well and the bulk of them evaded the trap. Henry Knox admitted losing six killed and 20 to 30 captured, while the British claimed to have taken 80 Americans as prisoners. British light cavalry seized three brass 3-pound cannons from the Americans.

The loss of their senior officers and the defeat at Bound Brook apparently caused "distracted" behavior in the ranks. In General Orders of 28 April at Morristown, New Jersey, Private Samuel Philips was sentenced to be reprimanded, Private Henry Randall and Ensign McKee were acquitted, and Lieutenant Simrall was cashiered for refusing to do his duty. Washington appended the following note.

The Commander in Chief (taking into consideration the late distracted State of the 8th. Pennsyl. Battalion, an inquiry into the cause of which he has directed to be made without loss of time) is pleased to suspend the execution of the Sentences of Alexander McKay, David Livinston, John Dilworth, John Edgar, Jacob Knight, John McClaugherry, William Roach, Daniel Clark, John Kirckendal, and Jacob Wilker -- Privates of that Battalion, 'till the proceedings of the Court are reported to him.

=== Philadelphia campaign to consolidation ===
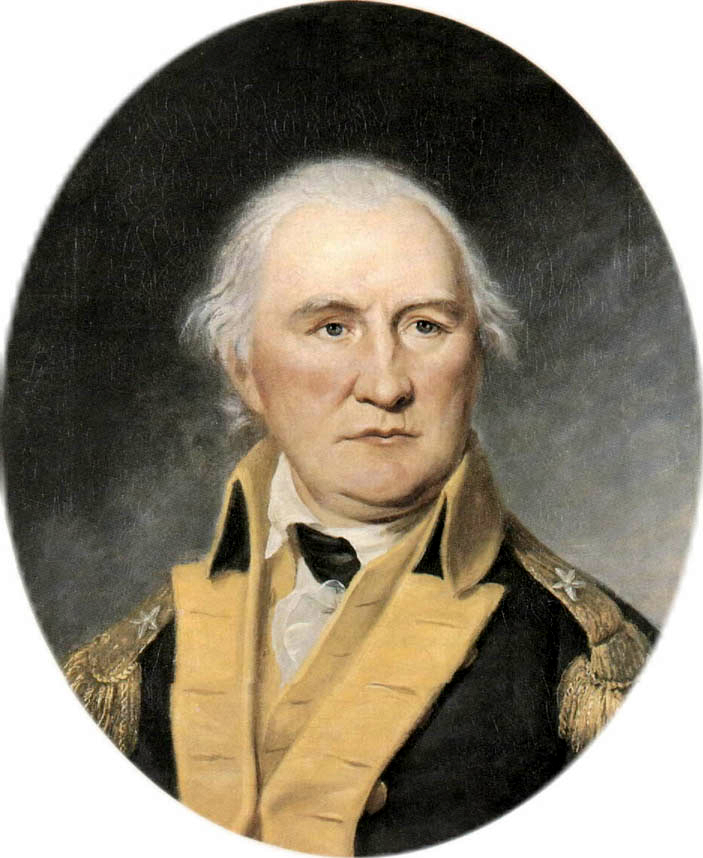
Colonel Daniel Morgan

On 22 May 1777 the 8th Pennsylvania was assigned to the 2nd Pennsylvania Brigade. In June, Lieutenant Colonel Butler, Captain Swearingen, and 139 men of the regiment were detached to Colonel Daniel Morgan's corps of riflemen. Morgan's corps fought at the Battles of Freeman's Farm and Bemis Heights during the successful Saratoga campaign. Meanwhile, the remainder of the 8th Pennsylvania served in the Philadelphia Campaign.

Under the acting command of Colonel Richard Humpton, the 2nd Pennsylvania Brigade saw action at Battle of Brandywine on 11 September 1777 in Anthony Wayne's division. The brigade deployed the 5th, 11th, 8th, and 4th Pennsylvania Regiments, in order from left to right, with the 1st Pennsylvania Brigade on its right. In the afternoon, the British attacked across Brandywine Creek at Chadds Ford. After a struggle, they overran Colonel Thomas Proctor's artillery redoubt and assailed Wayne's two brigades. During the fighting that followed, Major Bayard was hit in the shoulder by a spent cannonball, knocked off his horse, and tumbled 30 feet (9 m) over the ground. The dazed major somehow survived to be helped to his feet by Lieutenant Gabriel Peterson. Outnumbered, Wayne's division withdrew in good order 600 yards (549 m) to a hill at dusk.

The 8th was also at the Battle of Paoli on the night of 20–21 September. Still with Humpton's 2nd Pennsylvania Brigade, the regiment fought at the Battle of Germantown on 4 October. As at Brandywine, the 2nd Brigade formed the left wing of Wayne's Pennsylvania Division while the 1st Brigade made up the right wing. Deploying on the east side of the Germantown Road, Wayne's men attacked the right flank of the British 2nd Light Infantry Battalion. Together with Major General John Sullivan's Maryland division and Brigadier General Thomas Conway's Pennsylvania Brigade, Wayne's troops forced back the 2nd Light Infantry Battalion. Eager to avenge their defeat at Paoli, Wayne's soldiers charged forward with fixed bayonets and overran the light infantry's camp.

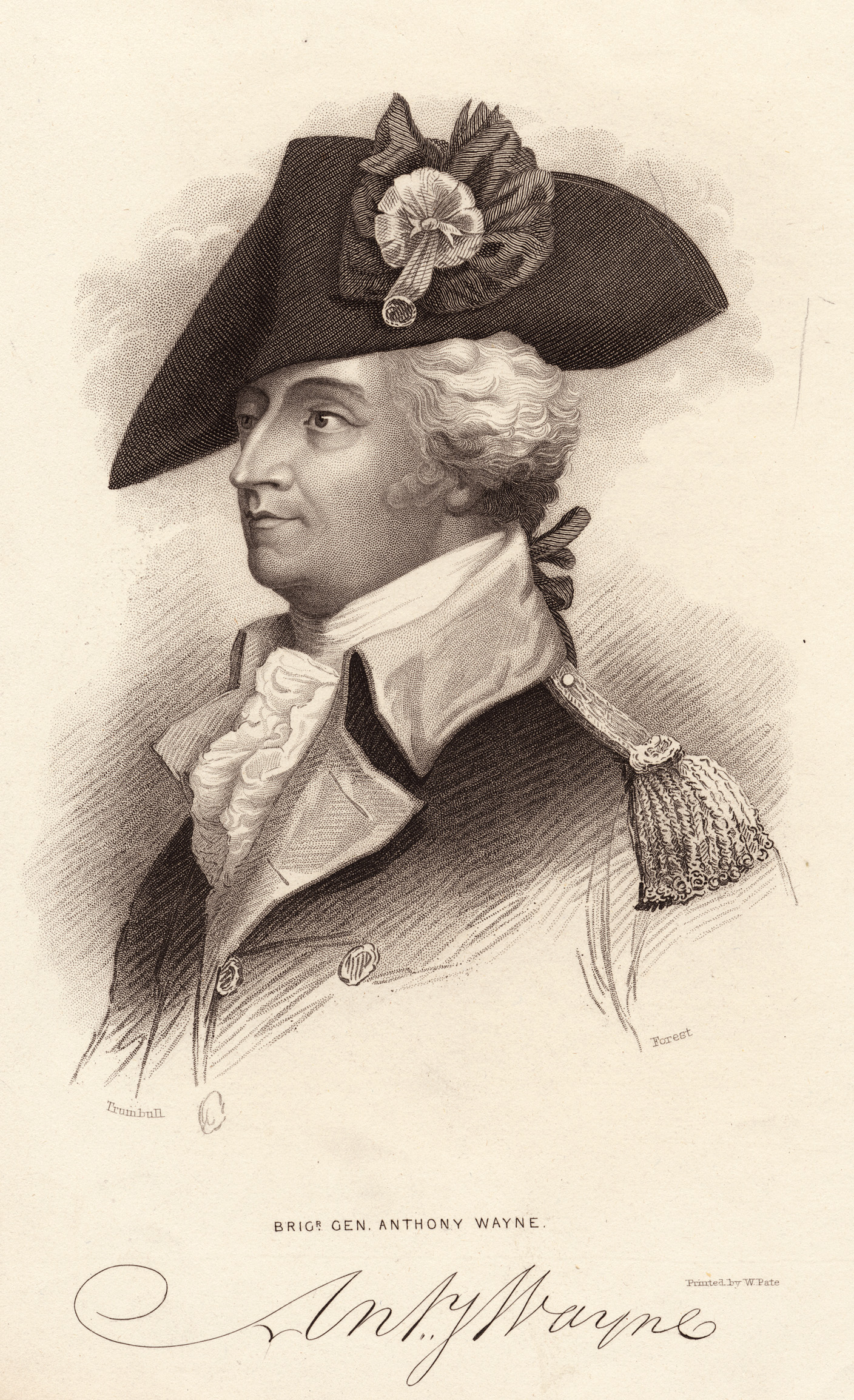
General Anthony Wayne

The light infantry rallied upon linking up with the 5th Foot and 55th Foot, but all three units were soon forced to withdraw. When British General Sir William Howe appeared on the scene he was startled to see his light infantry retreating before the American advance. He yelled, "For shame, Light Infantry! I never saw you retreat before. Form! Form! It is only a scouting party". After nearly being cut down by a blast of grape shot, Howe and his staff quickly rode off. The 2nd Pennsylvania Brigade soon attacked a picket of the 46th Foot and overran it. Soon Wayne's men became anxious because fighting at the Chew House erupted several hundred yards in their rear. Isolated in the fog, Wayne ordered an about-face and his two brigades began to move back toward the noise of battle. The 2nd Brigade, now on the division's right, blundered into part of Major General Adam Stephen's division moving forward. In a friendly fire incident, Stephen's men opened fire and the Pennsylvanians returned fire. Wayne's soldiers, fired on by fellow American troops and confused by the fog, panicked and fled from the battlefield. They finally rallied 3 miles (4.8 km) from the battlefield.

The riflemen with Morgan returned from the north and rejoined the regiment late in fall 1777. When the regiment went into winter quarters at Valley Forge, Bayard was lieutenant colonel and Frederick Vernon was major. The 8th Pennsylvania was assigned to the Western Department on 19 May 1778. The unit added a ninth company by absorbing Captain Samuel Morehead's Independent Company on 1 July 1778. The regiment was involved in Brigadier General Lachlan McIntosh's expedition to Ohio in November 1778. In January 1779, Captain John Clark and 15 soldiers of the 8th had just left Fort Laurens to travel to Fort McIntosh when they were ambushed by 17 Mingo Indians led by American Loyalist Simon Girty. Clark lost two killed, four wounded, and one captured before he and the survivors fought their way back to the fort. The fort held out against an Indian siege until relieved in March 1779, but McIntosh's plans for a continued advance to Fort Detroit were frustrated. Having installed Major Vernon and 106 soldiers of the 8th Regiment in Fort Laurens, McIntosh returned to Pennsylvania. The fort had to be relieved a second time at the end of May by Captain Robert Beall of the 9th Virginia Regiment and reinforced in June by Lieutenant Colonel Campbell. The post was finally abandoned in August 1779.

From 11 August to 14 September 1779, Brodhead led a 600-man column up the Allegheny River. In a march of 400 miles, the troops destroyed 10 Iroquois villages including Conewango and captured plunder including furs. For lack of guides, the column failed to link with John Sullivan's main column at Genesee (now known as Cuylerville, New York) as planned. The only fighting was a skirmish on 15 August when the advance guard scattered a force of Indians.

The 8th Regiment merged with the 2nd Pennsylvania Regiment on 17 January 1781. The consolidation occurred in the immediate aftermath of the Pennsylvania Line Mutiny from 1 to 8 January. The mutiny was a successful attempt by the troops to get better treatment and pay, and to secure discharge for those men who had served three years. Approximately 1,250 foot soldiers were discharged and only 1,150 were left in the ranks. Many discharged men, however, promptly reenlisted. All rank and file were furloughed until 15 March 1781, though sergeants and musicians had to remain on duty. Colonel Walter Stewart became commander of the reorganized 2nd Pennsylvania. Brodhead took command of the 1st Pennsylvania Regiment.

== Service record ==
Designation	Date	Brigade	Department
Defense Battalion	11 July 1776	none	Northern Department
Mackay's Battalion	20 July 1776	none	Northern Department
Mackay's Battalion	23 November 1776	none	Main Army
8th Pennsylvania Regiment	1 January 1777	none	Main Army
8th Pennsylvania Regiment	22 May 1777	2nd Pennsylvania	Main Army
8th Pennsylvania Regiment	19 May 1778	none	Western Department
8th Pennsylvania Regiment	17 January 1781	none	consolidated
