= Hartley's Additional Continental Regiment =

- Active: 1777–1781
- Allegiance: United States
- Branch: Continental Army
- Type: Line infantry
- Size: 8 companies
- Engagements: Northern New Jersey (1777); Battle of Brandywine (1777); Battle of Paoli (1777); Battle of Germantown (1777); Pennsylvania frontier (1778)

Commanders
- Notable commanders: Colonel Thomas Hartley

Hartley's Additional Continental Regiment was a line infantry regiment of the Continental Army that served in the American Revolutionary War. The regiment was authorized in January 1777 and Thomas Hartley was appointed its commander. The unit comprised eight companies from Pennsylvania, Maryland, and Delaware. When permanent brigades were formed in May 1777, the regiment was transferred to the 1st Pennsylvania Brigade. Hartley's Regiment fought at the battles of Brandywine, Paoli, and Germantown in 1777.

The unit helped defend the Pennsylvania frontier against indigenous raids in the Summer and early Fall of 1778. In January 1779, following a resolution of the Continental Congress the regiment, along with Patton's Additional Continental Regiment and part of Malcolm's Additional Continental Regiment, were combined to form a complete battalion known as the "New" 11th Pennsylvania Regiment. The 11th participated in the Sullivan Expedition in the summer of that year. In January 1781 the 11th merged with the 3rd Pennsylvania Regiment and ceased to exist.

== History ==
Hartley's Additional Continental Regiment was authorized on 12 January 1777 for service with the Continental Army. In December 1776, as his army retreated across New Jersey under British pressure, George Washington appealed to the Continental Congress for more soldiers. In September 1776, Congress had authorized an army of 88 infantry battalions. In the crisis, Congress acceded to Washington's requests on 27 December 1776. The delegates gave Washington sweeping authority to appoint officers and recruit an additional 16 battalions of infantry, three regiments of artillery, an engineer corps, and light cavalry formations. Unlike the original 88 battalions which were to be raised by the states, the "additional" regiments were solely under Washington's command.

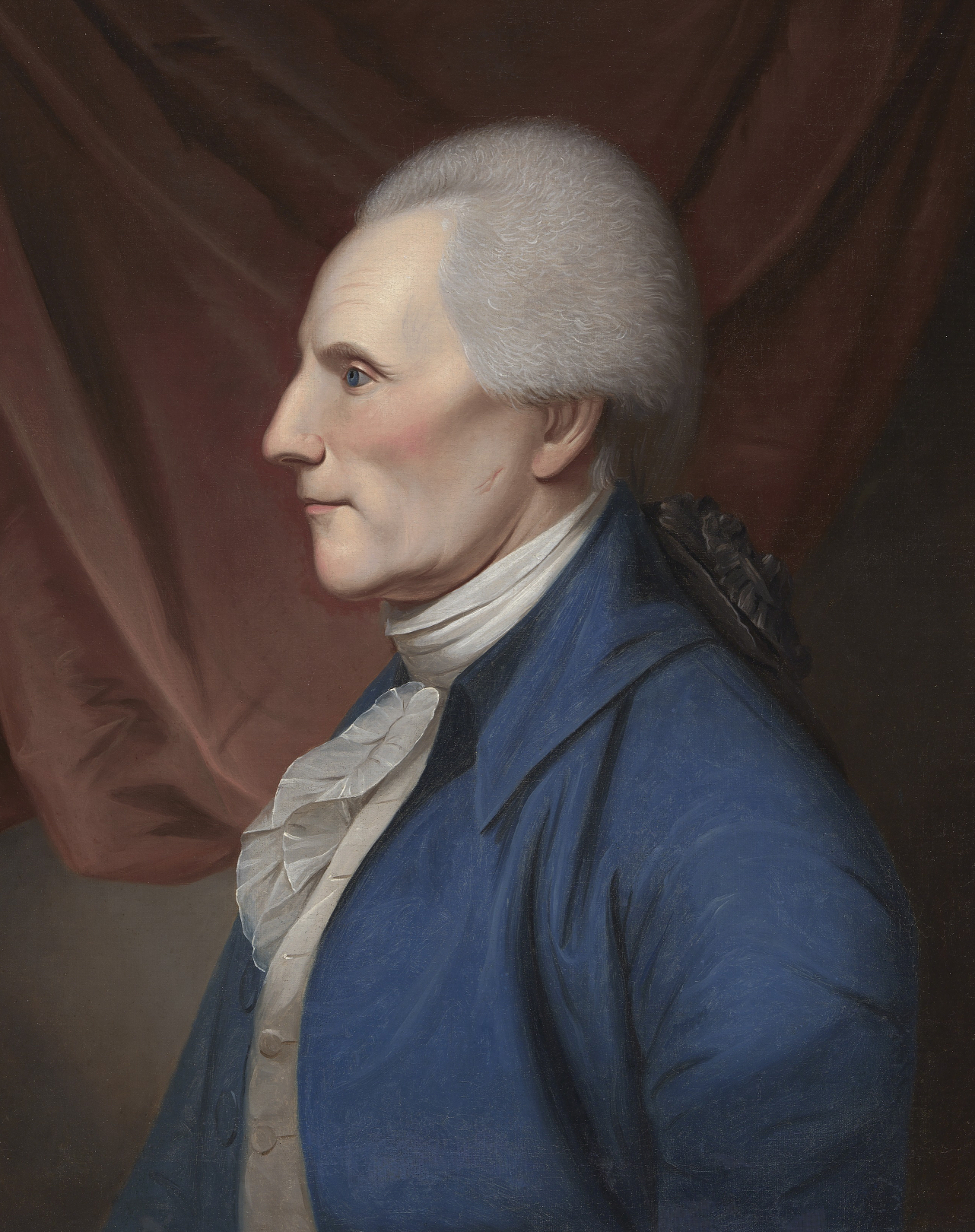
Richard Henry Lee, who urged the appointment of Thomas Hartley as colonel.

Upon the recommendation of delegate Richard Henry Lee, Washington appointed Thomas Hartley as colonel of one "additional" regiment. Hartley was the former lieutenant colonel of the 6th Pennsylvania Battalion. Hartley had broad authority to select his own officers. Accordingly, Hartley chose as his lieutenant colonel Morgan Connor, major of the 1st Pennsylvania Regiment. Initially, Hartley's Regiment was to contain ten companies, however, Hartley seems only to have recruited eight; four from Pennsylvania, three from Maryland and one from Virginia. Hartley's Regiment included a grenadier company, which was unusual for an American unit. The troops assembled at Philadelphia in the spring of 1777. On 22 May 1777, the regiment became part of the 1st Pennsylvania Brigade in Washington's main army.

On 11 September 1777, Hartley's Regiment fought at the Battle of Brandywine as part of a 2,000-man division led by Brigadier General Anthony Wayne. Since the division commander Major General Benjamin Lincoln was absent, Wayne moved up from the command of the 1st Pennsylvania Brigade and Hartley took his place as acting brigadier. Wayne drew up the division in line with the 1st Brigade on the right flank and the 2nd Pennsylvania Brigade on its left. From right to left, Hartley's units were drawn up in the order: 1st and 7th Pennsylvania Regiments, Hartley's Regiment, 10th and 2nd Pennsylvania Regiments. The right-most unit was deployed on the Great Road with Colonel Thomas Proctor's artillery lunette about 200 yards (183 m) in front. The Anglo-Hessian division led by Lieutenant General Wilhelm von Knyphausen attacked across Brandywine Creek at Chadds Ford. After a struggle, von Knyphausen's men overran the lunette and then advanced on Wayne's position.

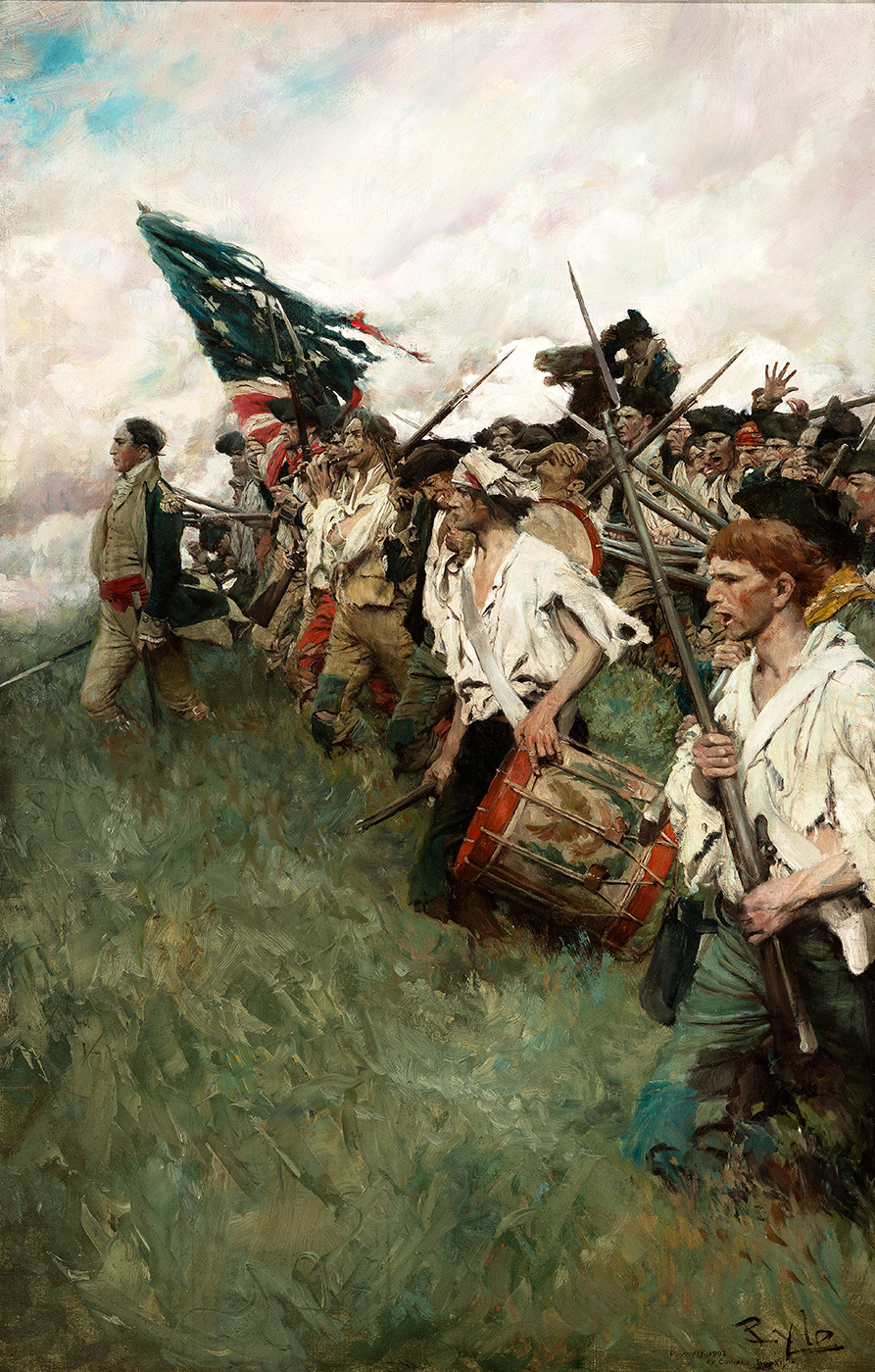
Howard Pyle's "Nationmakers" depicts American soldiers marching into action at the Battle of Brandywine.

In the firefight that followed, Major Lewis Bush of Hartley's Regiment had his horse killed under him. Shortly after mounting a second horse, he was fatally struck by a projectile and fell into the arms of Lieutenant Colonel Adam Hubley of the 10th Pennsylvania. Bush was the highest-ranking American officer killed at Brandywine. When the British and Hessians threatened to turn both of Wayne's flanks, he withdrew his division 600 yards (549 m) to a hill while successfully bringing off the brigade artillery. Nightfall ended the British pursuit.

The regiment also was present at the Battle of Paoli on 20 September. The Americans were alerted to the night-time attack, and began to retire in marching column. However, a cannon broke down, blocking the road and the 2nd and 1st Brigades halted. In a bayonet charge, the British routed the 1st Pennsylvania which was covering the retreat and burst among the Americans. The 7th Pennsylvania was the rear-most unit with Hartley's immediately ahead of it. In the chaos that followed, the British inflicted heavy casualties on their adversaries. Hubley admitted that 52 Americans died and total casualties numbered about 300 men, while the British lost only three killed and eight wounded.

On 4 October 1777, the regiment was in action at Battle of Germantown, still in the 1st Pennsylvania Brigade and Wayne's division. Major General John Sullivan's right wing, led by Brigadier General Thomas Conway's brigade bumped into the British 2nd Light Infantry Regiment near Mount Airy at the start of the engagement. After the light troops held up Conway's advance near Mount Pleasant, Sullivan committed the 1st and 2nd Maryland Brigades to the right of the Germantown Road and Wayne's division to the left. Recalling the Paoli "massacre", the Americans surged forward with shouts of, "Have at the Bloodhounds! Revenge Wayne's Affair!" With the 1st Brigade on the right and the 2nd Brigade on the left, Wayne's men attacked with fury, giving no quarter to those light infantrymen who tried to surrender. The 2nd Light Infantry put up a stubborn fight but was ultimately routed and the Pennsylvanians captured their camp.

By this time the British Army commander Sir William Howe appeared on the scene and attempted to rally his men. He shouted, "For shame, Light Infantry! I never saw you retreat before. Form! Form! It is only a scouting party." A blast of grapeshot soon proved otherwise and Howe prudently withdrew. The 5th Foot and 55th Foot arrived to support the light infantry, but they were also forced to fall back. In the confusion, the 40th Foot installed themselves in the solidly-built Chew House. After firing a few volleys at the house with no effect, Wayne's men left it behind and continued their southward advance into the morning's fog. Sullivan shifted Conway's brigade to the right of his Maryland troops and also pushed onward. At this point, contact between Wayne's division and the rest of Sullivan's wing was broken. Both Wayne and Sullivan advanced several hundred yards beyond the Chew House before the advance stalled. When the American rear echelon units began bombarding the Chew House with cannons, Wayne and his men became anxious and turned back. In the fog, they blundered into Major General Adam Stephen's advancing Virginia division. In a friendly fire incident, both American forces volleyed at one another. Confused in the fog and taking fire from several directions, Wayne's men took to their heels and did not rally until they were 3 miles (4.8 km) from the battlefield.

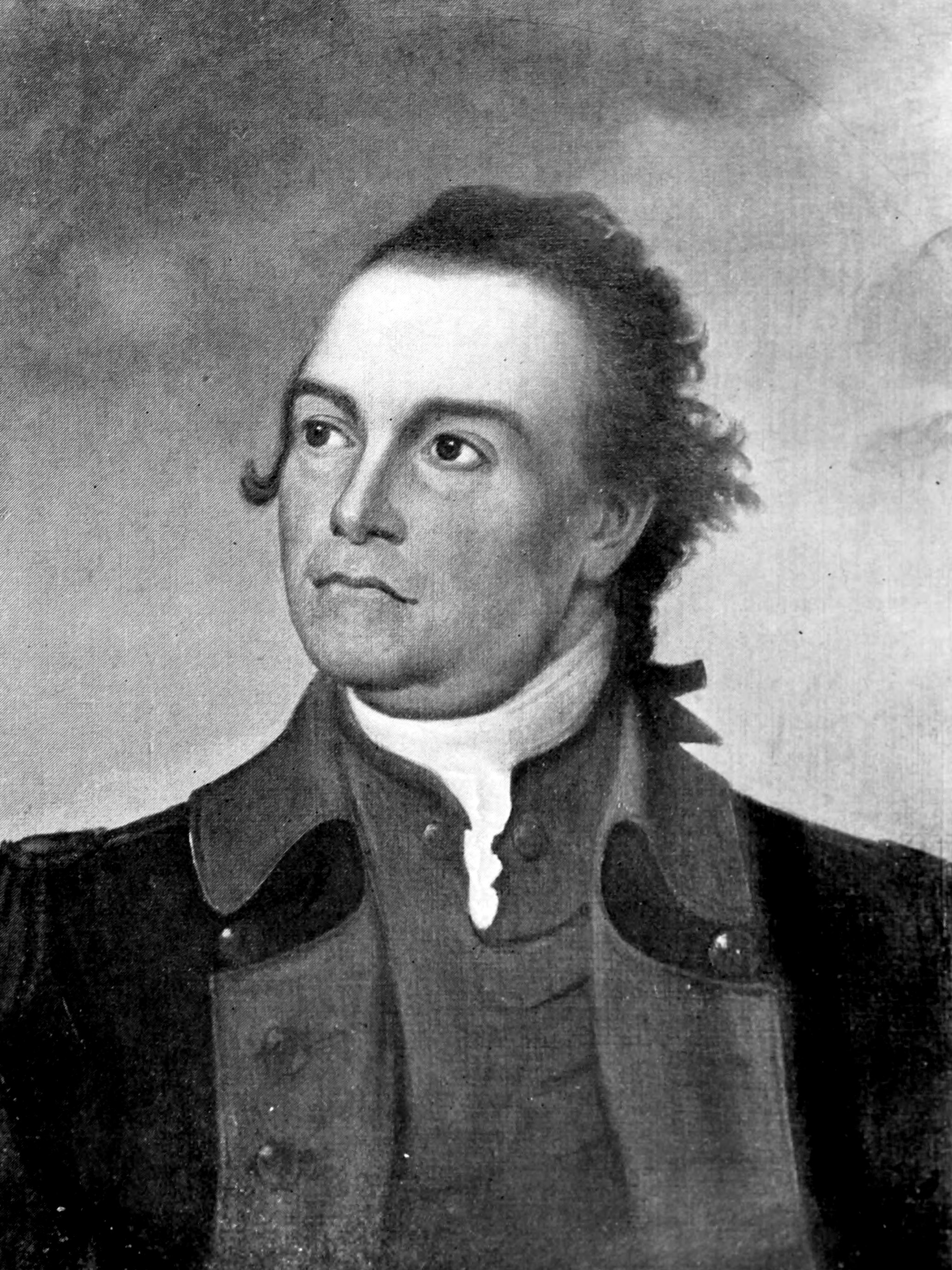
John Sullivan led an expedition against the Iroquis in the summer of 1779.

On 8 January 1778, Hartley's Regiment was assigned to the Middle Department and in March it became part of the Pennsylvania Line. Captain William Scott's company from Thruston's Additional Continental Regiment was absorbed on 4 April 1778. Sent to the Pennsylvania frontier to oppose raids by the Iroquois and their American Loyalist allies, Hartley's Regiment arrived in the Wyoming Valley after the Battle of Wyoming. In September 1778, elements of the regiment participated in a counter-raid in which they destroyed a few indigenous villages, recovered plunder taken in the Wyoming Valley, and skirmished with Seneca warriors. Hearing that a large body of warriors was assembling at Unadilla, Colonel Hartley withdrew his 130-man column.

On 13 January 1779, following a resolution of the Continental Congress Hartley's Regiment was consolidated with Patton's Additional Continental Regiment and the three companies of Malcolm's Additional Continental Regiment commanded by Captains John Doyle, John Steele, and James Calderwood and were ordered to join the Pennsylvania Line. The new unit was named the 11th Pennsylvania Regiment and organized in the strength of nine companies. Colonel Hartley, officially resigned his commission a month later on February 13, 1779.

Since the "Old Eleventh" was consolidated with the 10th Pennsylvania Regiment in July 1778 and was no longer in existence, the regiment became known as the "New Eleventh". Assigned to Edward Hand's Brigade in April 1779, the unit joined the Sullivan Expedition that summer,. The only major engagement of the campaign was the Battle of Newtown on 29 August 1779. In this action, Butler's Rangers, Brant's Volunteers, and several hundred Seneca and Cayuga warriors attempted to ambush Sullivan's 3,200-man column. The American advance guard of riflemen detected the trap and Sullivan deployed his troops. Enoch Poor's New Hampshire brigade supported by James Clinton's New Yorkers tried to envelop the enemy's left flank, while Hand's brigade pressed the center and the 1st New Jersey moved to attack the right. Many of the Seneca and Cayuga bolted when Thomas Proctor's artillery opened fire. A counterattack led by Joseph Brant against Poor's brigade was driven off. Faced with envelopment by a greatly superior force, the Rangers and Brant's Volunteers hastily withdrew. Thereafter, the expedition did great damage to Iroquois territory, burning 40 towns, despoiling crops, and cutting down orchards. The Iroquois people were forced to beg for food from the British that winter, but their ferocious attacks on frontier settlements continued. In August 1780, the regiment transferred to the 2nd Pennsylvania Brigade. On 17 January 1781 the "New Eleventh" consolidated with the 3rd Pennsylvania Regiment and ceased to exist.

== Service record ==
Designation	Date	Brigade	Department
Hartley's Additional Regiment	12 January 1777	none	Main Army
Hartley's Additional Regiment	22 May 1777	1st Pennsylvania	Main Army
Hartley's Additional Regiment	8 January 1778	none	Middle
11th Pennsylvania Regiment	13 January 1779	none	Middle
11th Pennsylvania Regiment	9 April 1779	Hand's	Main Army
11th Pennsylvania Regiment	1 August 1780	2nd Pennsylvania	Main Army
11th Pennsylvania Regiment	17 January 1781	2nd Pennsylvania	consolidated

== Bibliography ==
- Boatner, Mark M. III (1994). Encyclopedia of the American Revolution. Mechanicsburg, Pa.: Stackpole Books. ISBN 0-8117-0578-1.
- McGuire, Thomas J. (2006). The Philadelphia Campaign, Volume I. Mechanicsburg, Penn.: Stackpole Books. ISBN 0-8117-0178-6.
- McGuire, Thomas J. (2007). The Philadelphia Campaign, Volume II. Mechanicsburg, Penn.: Stackpole Books. ISBN 0-8117-0206-5.
- Wright, Robert K. Jr. (1989). The Continental Army. Washington, D.C.: United States Army Center of Military History. CMH Pub 60-4.
