= Pennsylvania Line =

Military formation in the Continental Army

The Pennsylvania Line was a formation within the Continental Army. The term "Pennsylvania Line" referred to the quota of numbered infantry regiments assigned to Pennsylvania at various times by the Continental Congress.

These, together with similar contingents from the other twelve states, formed the Continental Line. The concept was particularly important in relation to the promotion of commissioned officers. Officers of the Continental Army below the rank of brigadier general were ordinarily ineligible for promotion except in the line of their own state.

== History and notable features ==
Not all Continental infantry regiments raised in a state were part of a state quota, however. On December 27, 1776, the Continental Congress gave Washington temporary control over certain military decisions that the Congress ordinarily regarded as its own prerogative. These "dictatorial powers" included the authority to raise sixteen additional Continental infantry regiments at large.

Early in 1777, Washington offered command of one of these additional regiments to Thomas Hartley of Pennsylvania, who accepted. Hartley had formerly been lieutenant colonel of the 6th Pennsylvania Battalion. Hartley's Additional Continental Regiment was allotted to the Pennsylvania Line on March 27, 1778. On January 13, 1779, it absorbed Patton's Regiment and was designated the 11th Pennsylvania Regiment. The latter was called the "New Eleventh Pennsylvania Regiment" as the original 11th Pennsylvania Regiment had been consolidated with the 10th Pennsylvania Regiment on July 1, 1778.

Washington also offered command to John Patton of Pennsylvania, who accepted leadership of Patton's Additional Continental Regiment. In 1776, Patton had commanded a battalion of the Pennsylvania State Rifle Regiment.

Half of Malcolm's Additional Continental Regiment was drawn from New York and half from Pennsylvania.

Still other Continental infantry regiments and smaller units, also unrelated to a state quota, were raised as needed for special or temporary service. Nelson's and Doyle's Independent Rifle Companies were examples of such "extra" units.

== Pennsylvania Line, 1776 ==
- 1st Pennsylvania Battalion
- 2d Pennsylvania Battalion
- 3d Pennsylvania Battalion
- 4th Pennsylvania Battalion
- 5th Pennsylvania Battalion
- 6th Pennsylvania Battalion

== Pennsylvania Line, 1777 ==
- 1st Pennsylvania Regiment
- 2nd Pennsylvania Regiment
- 3rd Pennsylvania Regiment
- 4th Pennsylvania Regiment
- 5th Pennsylvania Regiment
- 6th Pennsylvania Regiment
- 7th Pennsylvania Regiment
- 8th Pennsylvania Regiment
- 9th Pennsylvania Regiment
- 10th Pennsylvania Regiment
- 11th Pennsylvania Regiment
- 12th Pennsylvania Regiment
- 13th Pennsylvania Regiment
- 14th Pennsylvania Regiment
