= 12th Pennsylvania Regiment =

Continental Army infantry regiment

- Active: 1776–1778
- Country: (United States) Continental Congress
- Type: Infantry
- Size: Regiment
- Part of: Pennsylvania Line
- Engagements: American Revolutionary War: Battle of the Assunpink Creek; Battle of Princeton; Battle of Brandywine; Battle of Germantown; Battle of Monmouth

The 12th Pennsylvania Regiment also known as Northampton and Northumberland Defense Battalion was an American infantry unit that fought during the American Revolutionary War as part of the Continental Army. The regiment was raised 23 August 1776 at Sunbury, Pennsylvania, as a state militia regiment and later renamed the 12th Pennsylvania. In January 1777 the 12th was commanded by Colonel William Cooke at Princeton. Assigned to Thomas Conway's 3rd Pennsylvania Brigade, the regiment would see action at Brandywine, Germantown, and Monmouth. The regiment was merged into the 3rd Pennsylvania Regiment shortly after Monmouth and went out of existence.
