= Ephraim Blaine =

Colonel Ephraim Blaine (1741–1804) was an early Pennsylvania settler who served as commissary-general for the middle district of the Continental Army under General George Washington. His great-grandson was Speaker of the House and 1884 presidential nominee James G. Blaine.

== Early life ==
Blaine was born in County Londonderry, Ireland in 1741, the son of James Blaine and his wife, Isabella. The family moved to Pennsylvania in 1745 when Ephraim was four years old. The Blaine family settled near the western frontier in Westmoreland County, Pennsylvania, later relocating to the east, in Cumberland County. He received some schooling at Dr. Francis Alison's New London Academy in Chester County, then returned to the family homestead. In his early twenties, Blaine fought in the French and Indian War, and was among the defenders of Fort Pitt from the forces of Chief Pontiac in the subsequent Pontiac's War. After the wars ended and commerce resumed with the Native American tribes, Blaine began a career trading with them and became one of the wealthiest men in western Pennsylvania.

Blaine married Rebecca Galbraith in 1765 and three sons, Robert, James, and David, were born to them in quick succession. Remaining in Cumberland County, Blaine was elected a member of the Pennsylvania Provincial Assembly in 1770. From 1771 to 1773, he served as county sheriff. In 1774, he was chosen as a member of the county's Committee for Observation, which was formed to observe and address concerns with the royal government.

== Revolutionary War service ==
In 1776, with the outbreak of war, Blaine was named chief commissary officer of the newly formed 8th Pennsylvania Regiment. Soon thereafter, Washington appointed Blaine commissary of purchases for the northern (or middle) department of the Continental Army. In that position, Blaine helped to feed the Army that wintered at Valley Forge in 1777–1778. In 1777, Blaine was also made colonel of the Cumberland County militia. As commissary-general, Blaine traveled throughout the colonies to arrange food deliveries for the army, often having to advance his own money for payment.

After the war ended, Blaine returned to Carlisle and resumed his trading business, also engaging in land speculation. He remained out of the political arena, but did host Washington at his home in 1794 when the President was traveling west to confront the Whiskey Rebels. Washington and Blaine maintained a strong friendship until the former's death in 1799.

Blaine's wife, Rebecca, died in 1795 and he married again, to Sarah Elizabeth Postlethwaite, in 1797. They had one son, also named Ephraim. Blaine died at his home in 1804. He is buried at Meetinghouse Springs Church near Carlisle.

== Descendants ==
Blaine's most notable descendant was his great-grandson, James G. Blaine, who served as Speaker of the House of Representatives and ran for president several times. Blaine was also great-great-grandfather to Walker Blaine.

== Sources ==
- Crapol, Edward P. (2000). James G. Blaine: Architect of Empire. Biographies in American Foreign Policy. Vol. 4. Wilmington, Delaware: Scholarly Resources. ISBN 0-8420-2604-5.
- Houston, Florence Amelia Wilson; Blaine, Laura Anna Cowan; Mellette, Ella Dunn (1916). Maxwell History and Genealogy. Indianapolis, Indiana: C.E. Pauley.
- Muzzey, David Saville (1934). James G. Blaine: A Political Idol of Other Days. New York, New York: Dodd, Mead, and Company.
- Rodenbough, Theodore; Haskin, William, eds. (1896). The Army of the United States: Historical Sketches of Staff and Line with Portraits of Generals-in-Chief. Maynard, Merrill & Co.
- Russell, Charles Edward (1931). Blaine of Maine. New York, New York: Cosmopolitan Book Corporation.
- Minutes of the Provincial Council of Pennsylvania: Pennsylvania. Vol. IX. Harrisburg, Pennsylvania: Theo. Fenn & Co. 1852.
