= David Harris (American Revolution) =

David Harris (February 24, 1754 ― November 16, 1809) was an officer in the Continental Army during the American Revolutionary War.

== Early life ==
Harris was born in Dauphin County, Pennsylvania, the son of John Harris and his wife Elizabeth McClure.

== Military service ==
He was a commissioned officer in the Continental Army during the American Revolution. Documentation of his military service indicates that in June 1775 he was paymaster of the 1st Pennsylvania Regiment, a rifle unit initially commanded by Colonel William Thompson and later by Colonel Edward Hand.

Harris was promoted to third lieutenant on November 8, 1775, and to first lieutenant on January 5, 1776. He achieved the rank of captain in the 1st Pennsylvania Regiment on September 25, 1776. On August 13, 1777, he wrote to General Hand on the bravery of Morgan's Riflemen, including Captain James Parr.

He resigned from service in October 1777.

== Death ==
He died on November 16, 1809, in Baltimore, Maryland.
