= Battle of Green Spring =

Battle of the American Revolutionary War

- Part of the American Revolutionary War
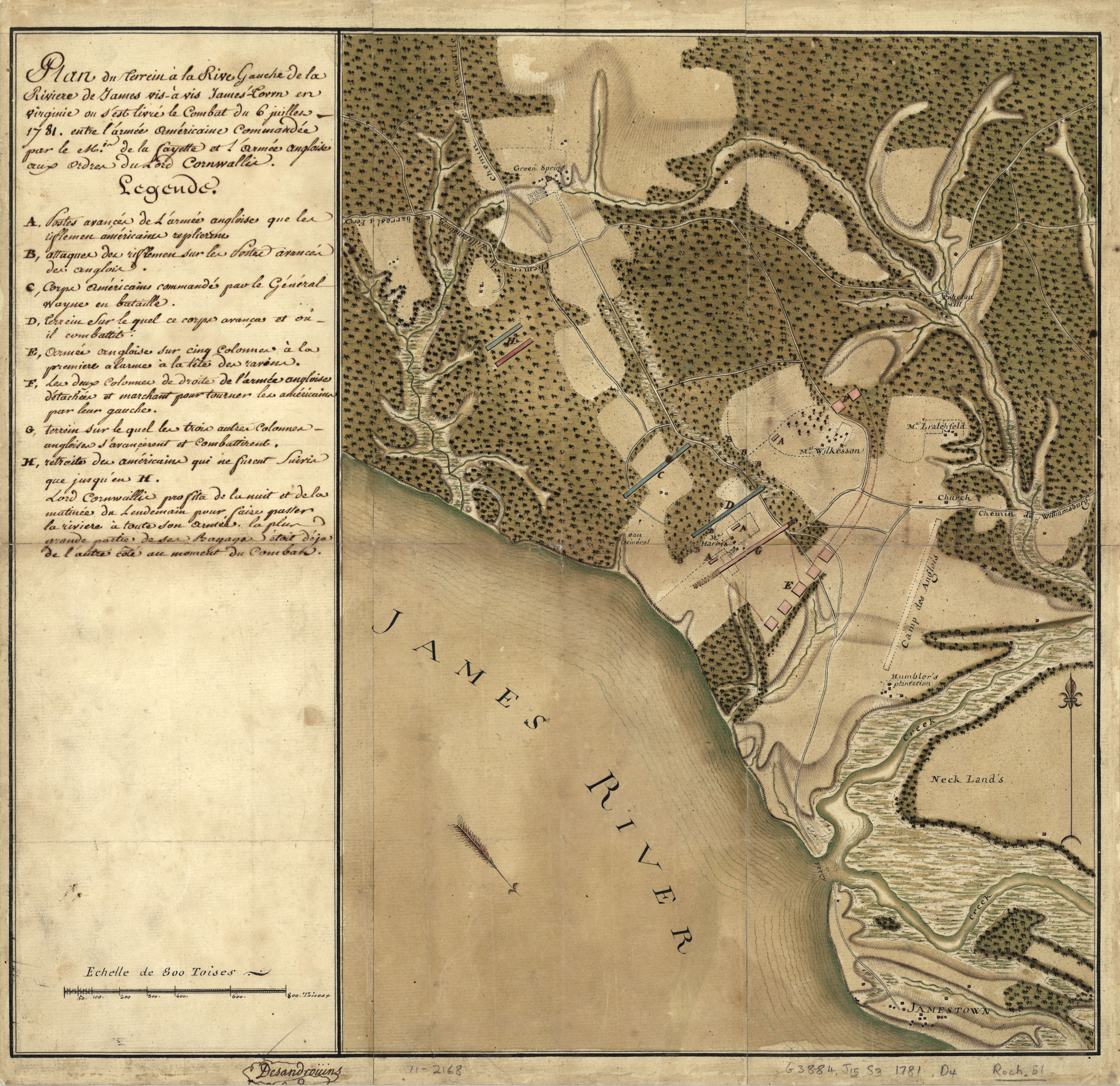
- A French map depicting the battle
Date	July 6, 1781
Location	James City County, Virginia 37°14′06″N 76°47′06″W
Result	British victory

Belligerents
United States	Great Britain

Commanders and leaders
Marquis de Lafayette; Anthony Wayne	Charles Cornwallis; Banastre Tarleton

Strength
800–900	About 7,000

Casualties and losses
28 killed 122 wounded	75 killed and wounded

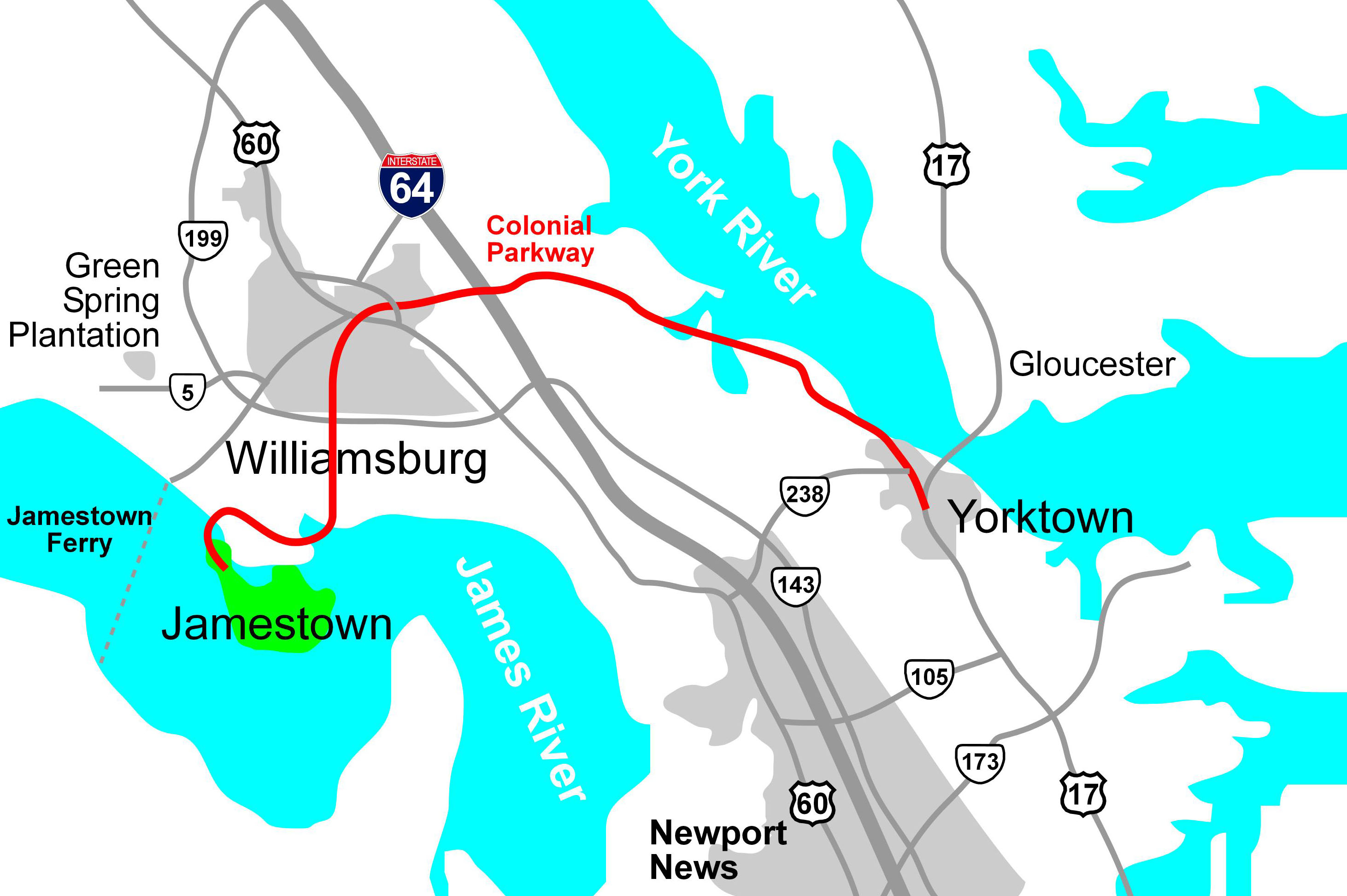
Green Spring's location relative to 21st-century highways

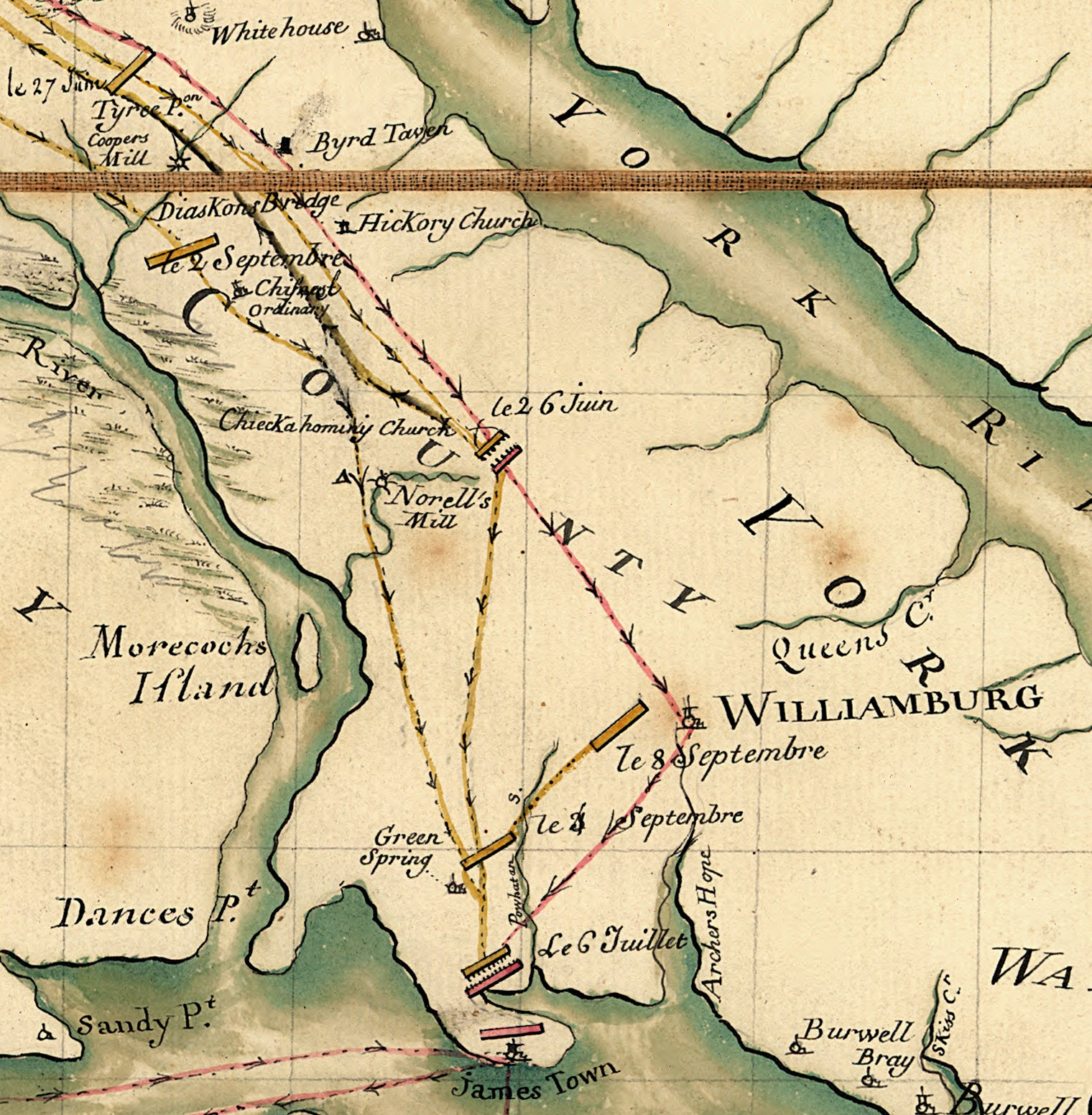
Detail from a 1781 French map prepared for Lafayette depicting the Williamsburg/Jamestown area and the movements of Lafayette and Cornwallis. The Green Spring conflict is labelled "le 6 Juillet".

The Battle of Green Spring took place near Green Spring Plantation in James City County, Virginia during the American Revolutionary War. On July 6, 1781 United States Brigadier General "Mad" Anthony Wayne, leading the advance forces of the Marquis de Lafayette, was ambushed near the plantation by the British army of Earl Charles Cornwallis in the last major land battle of the Virginia campaign prior to the Siege of Yorktown.

Following a month of marching and countermarching in central Virginia by Cornwallis and Lafayette, Cornwallis in late June moved to Williamsburg, where he received orders to move to Portsmouth and send some of his army to New York City. Lafayette followed Cornwallis fairly closely, emboldened by the arrival of reinforcements to consider making attacks on the British force. On July 4, Cornwallis departed Williamsburg for Jamestown, planning to cross the James River en route to Portsmouth. Lafayette believed he could stage an attack on Cornwallis's rear guard during the crossing.

Cornwallis anticipated Lafayette's idea, and laid an elaborate trap. General Wayne's forces were very nearly caught in the trap, and only a bold bayonet charge against the numerically superior British enabled his forces to retreat. Cornwallis did not follow the victory with pursuit, instead following his plan to cross the river. The action reinforced the perception among contemporaries that justified the moniker "Mad" to describe Wayne, although opinion on the merits of his actions was divided. The battlefield has been partially preserved, and reenactments are sometimes staged.

== Background ==
In May 1781, Earl Charles Cornwallis arrived in Petersburg, Virginia after a lengthy campaign through North and South Carolina. In addition to his 1,400 men, he assumed command of another 3,600 that had been under the command of the turncoat Benedict Arnold, and was soon thereafter further reinforced by about 2,000 more sent from New York. These forces were opposed by a much smaller Continental Army force led by the Marquis de Lafayette, then located at Richmond. Following orders originally given to Arnold's predecessor in command, William Phillips (who died a week before Cornwallis's arrival), Cornwallis worked to eliminate Virginia's ability to support the revolutionary cause, giving chase to Lafayette's army, which numbered barely 3,000 and included a large number of inexperienced militia.

Lafayette successfully avoided engaging Cornwallis, who used his numerical advantage to detach forces for raids against economic, military, and political targets in central Virginia. After about one month of this activity, Cornwallis turned back to the east, marching for Williamsburg. Lafayette, whose force grew to number about 4,000 with the arrival of Continental Army reinforcements under General Anthony Wayne and additional experienced militiamen under William Campbell, followed Cornwallis. Buoyed by the increase in his troop strength, Lafayette also became more aggressive in his tactics, sending out detachments of his force to counteract those that Cornwallis sent on forage and raiding expeditions. One such foray led to a clash at Spencer's Ordinary, a crossroads not far from Williamsburg, in late June.

When Cornwallis arrived at Williamsburg, he received orders from General Sir Henry Clinton to go to Portsmouth and prepare a detachment of troops to return to New York City. Pursuant to these orders, Cornwallis began moving south on the Virginia Peninsula on July 4, planning to cross the wide James River at the Jamestown ferry. Lafayette followed, with advance units and most of his Continentals reaching Norrell's Mill, about 8 miles (13 km) from the ferry on July 5.

Lafayette saw an opportunity to attack the British force as it made the difficult crossing of the James. Cornwallis also recognized the possibility, and decided to lay a trap, hoping to capture a portion of Lafayette's army. He only sent his baggage train and John Graves Simcoe's Queen's Rangers across the river, and concealed his main force near the crossing. Cornwallis also sent men to "desert" to the Americans with information that most of the British force had crossed, leaving only a rear guard on the north side of the river.

== Prelude ==
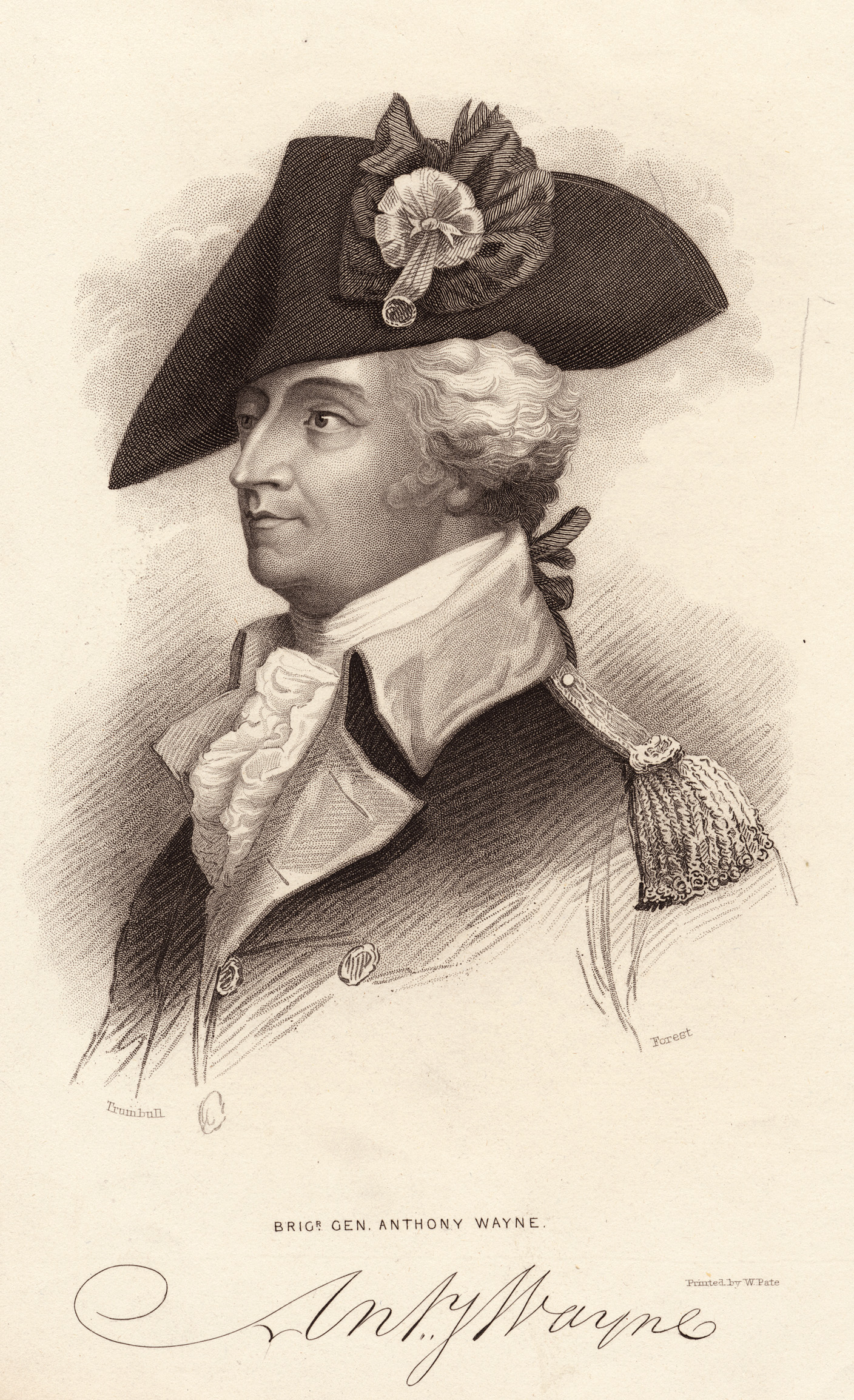
Brigadier General Anthony Wayne, 18th-century engraving

The position where Cornwallis hid his army was well-chosen. To the left, impassable swampy terrain sloped down toward the river. To the right, there was more marshy ground and a few ponds. The access from the rest of the mainland toward the ferry was via a 400-yard (370 m) causeway from the Green Spring Plantation that was surrounded by marshlands that an advancing army would have to negotiate. The earl arranged his army in two lines, with the 76th and 80th regiments along with part of the 43rd and Banastre Tarleton's British Legion on the left, and the Brigade of Guards, and Hessian auxiliaries on the right. Both wings also included light infantry companies. Cornwallis left a small company of German jägers and a few men from the Legion to give the appearance of a rear guard picket, and gave them specific orders to resist the American advance as much as possible.

Brigadier General "Mad" Anthony Wayne led Lafayette's advance company, about 500 men, out early on July 6 from Norrell's Tavern. When Wayne reached Green Spring, he surveyed the terrain and noted the presence of the British guards. When Lafayette came up with his main force, the two men decided to go ahead with the attack, but Lafayette ordered more troops forward from Norrell's Tavern around 1 pm. Some minor skirmishing took place while they awaited these troops. Wayne's 500 soldiers included 200 Virginia riflemen under Majors John Willis and Richard Call backed by additional light infantry led by John Francis Mercer, William Galvan, and McPherson. Colonel Walter Stewart's Pennsylvania Continental battalion formed the reserve. Lafayette sent forward two Pennsylvania Continental battalions under Colonels Richard Butler and Richard Humpton, and Major John P. Wyllys' light infantry battalion. Beginning to suspect something was amiss, Lafayette held back the light infantry battalions of Colonels Francis Barber and Joseph Vose. The three-battalion reinforcement increased the size of the force Wayne ordered into the swamps around 3:00 pm to between eight and nine hundred men. Wayne's force now consisted of two companies of riflemen, one of dragoons, and most of the Pennsylvania Line, and included three pieces of field artillery. As they moved out, Lafayette rode out toward a spit of land on the riverbank from which he might observe the action.

== Battle ==
Wayne's advance force and the British pickets then began an extended skirmish lasting nearly two hours. The British forces slowly retreated, suffering significant casualties under the persistent American advance. Wayne's riflemen performed particularly well, picking off several of the British commanding officers. However, the tables turned around 5 pm when the Americans reached an "abandoned" gun that Cornwallis had left in the road. Their seizure of the gun was the signal for the British counterattack, which began with a barrage of canister and grape shot, and was followed by an infantry charge.

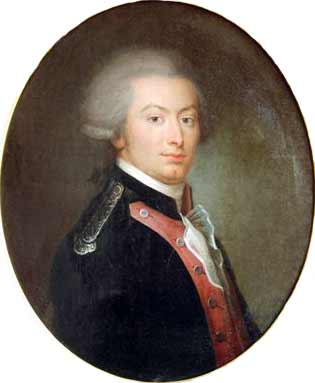
Marquis de Lafayette, portrait by John Opie

Lafayette, from his vantage point on the river, had spotted the main British force and realized that Wayne was entering a trap. However, he was not able to reach Wayne in time to recall him. He immediately began moving additional troops forward in an attempt to prevent the trap from closing on Wayne. In the meantime, the British charge had thrown the Americans into some confusion, and Wayne was concerned that a retreat would turn into a disorderly rout. Wayne reformed his line, ordered his artillery to fire a blast of grape shot, and then had the line charge the overwhelming numerically superior British with bayonets fixed.

Wayne's audacious charge worked; it successfully halted the British advance long enough for Lafayette's covering force to approach. Lafayette rode forward to assist in managing the American retreat, which began to crumble after Cornwallis personally led a countercharge. During the retreat, two of the American guns had to be abandoned because their horses were shot, and Lafayette was also unhorsed. As the sun was beginning to set, Cornwallis chose not to pursue the Americans, who retreated to Green Spring.

== Aftermath ==
British reports of casualties in the battle listed 5 officers and 70 enlisted men killed or wounded. American casualties were reported to number about 140, including 28 killed. Cornwallis, satisfied with the victory, did not pursue the retreating Americans, and instead crossed the James as planned and moved on to Portsmouth. There his arrangements to embark troops were countermanded by new orders from Clinton that instead ordered him to use his force to establish a fortified naval station. This Cornwallis chose to do at Yorktown, where he was compelled to surrender after a brief siege in October 1781.

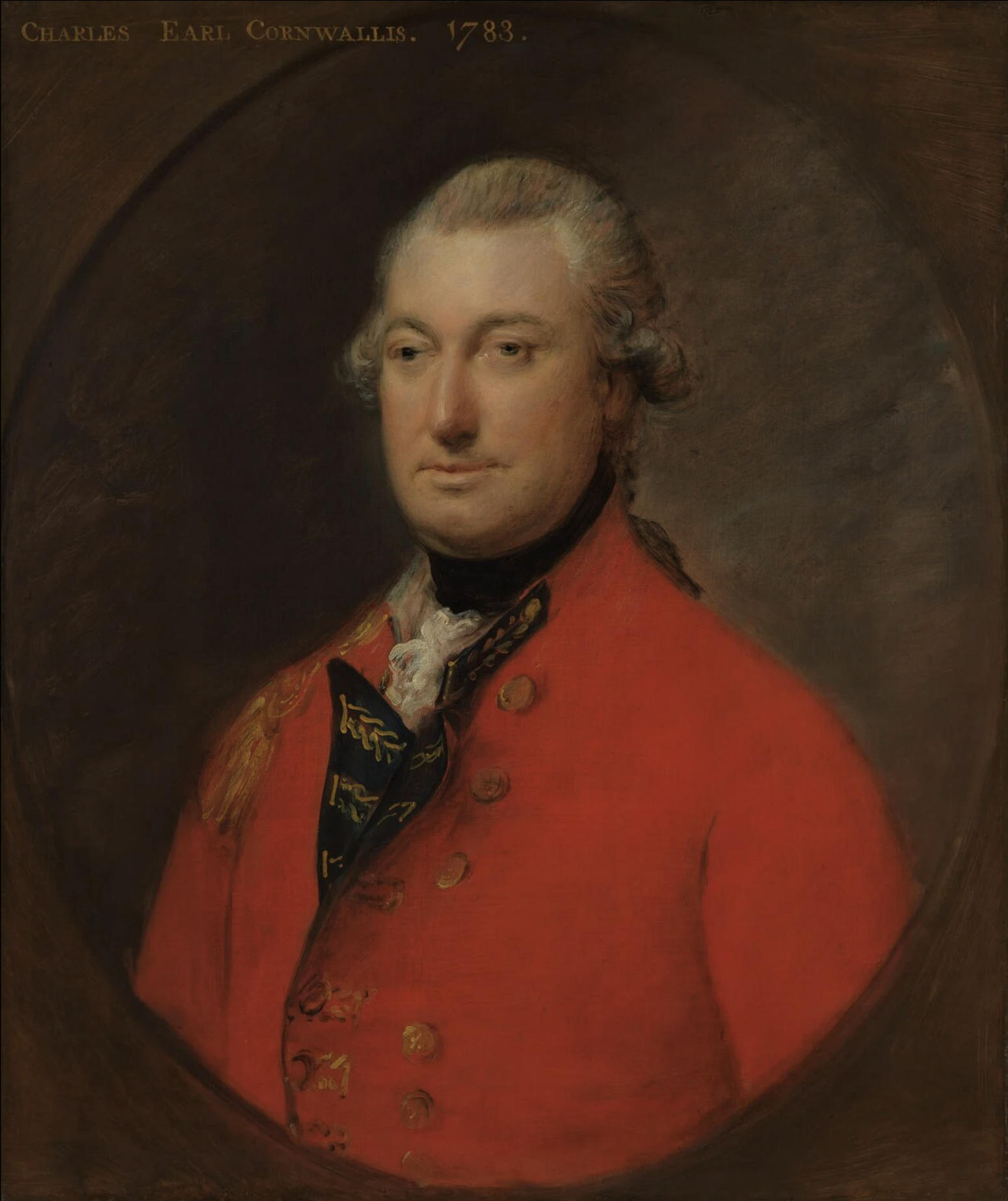
Portrait of Lord Cornwallis by Thomas Gainsborough, 1783

Lafayette, in his dispatches and reports throughout the later stages of the Virginia campaign, painted Cornwallis's movements to Williamsburg and Portsmouth as a retreat. These reports bolstered Lafayette's reputation, and the battle, although a tactical setback, did not harm that reputation. General Wayne wrote of his decision to charge the full British force that it was "one of those prudent, tho' daring manoeuvers which seldom fail of producing the desired effect; the result in this Instance fully Justified it." Lafayette publicly lauded Wayne's performance, but recorded privately that Wayne made tactical mistakes and the battle read well "in a gazette". Militia general Peter Muhlenberg blamed the loss on "the impetuosity of our brother Brigadier." Wayne biographer Paul Nelson opines that Americans of the day could "hardly decide after the battle whether to admire Wayne for his brave and impetuous character or to condemn him as a foolhardy adventurer."

Madness — Mad Anthony, by God, I never knew such a piece of work heard of — about eight hundred troops opposed to five or six thousand veterans on their own ground.

— unknown writer, New Jersey Gazette

== Legacy ==
Portions of the Green Spring Plantation were purchased in 1966 by the National Park Service, and are now part of the Colonial National Historical Park. These holdings were added to the National Register of Historic Places in 1978, and are, as of June 2010, open only by special arrangement.
