= Richard Humpton =

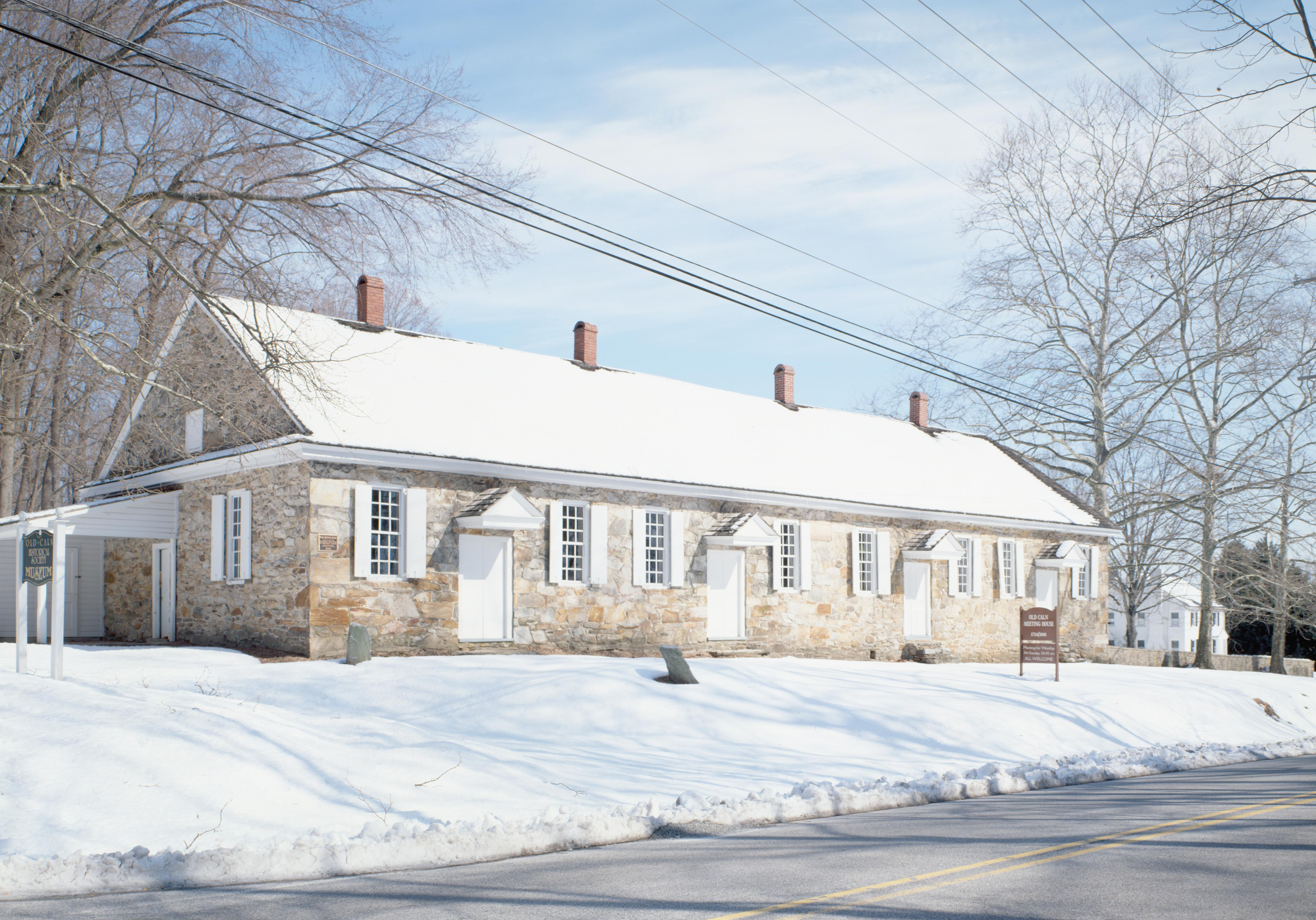
- Richard Humpton was interred at the Caln Meeting House burial ground.
- Born: 1733; Yorkshire, England
- Died: 21 December 1804 (aged 70–71) Caln Township, Chester Co., PA
- Allegiance: (United Kingdom) Great Britain; United States
- Branch: Infantry
- Service years: (United Kingdom) 1758–1759 (United States) 1775–1783
- Rank: (United Kingdom) Captain (United States) Brevet Brigadier General
- Conflicts: Seven Years' War: Raid on St Malo (1758); American Revolutionary War: Battle of Brandywine (1777); Battle of Paoli (1777); Battle of Germantown (1777); Battle of Monmouth (1778); Battle of Green Spring (1781)
- Other work: Society of the Cincinnati

Richard Humpton (1733 – 1804) was an officer in the Continental Army during the American Revolutionary War.

== Formative years and family ==
Born in Yorkshire, England in 1733, Humpton was a son of Richard Humpton and Dorothy Grindall. He married Elizabeth Morris but the couple had no children.

Humpton purchased a captain's commission in the Royal Army and fought in the Raid on St Malo during the Seven Years' War. While posted in the West Indies, he resigned his commission and moved to the Susquehanna River in Pennsylvania.

== American Revolution ==
At the beginning of the American Revolutionary War he offered his services to the patriot cause and was named a lieutenant colonel in 1776. Later that year he became colonel commanding the 11th Pennsylvania Regiment. Tasked with collecting boats on the Delaware River, his attention to this assignment materially helped the Americans win the Battle of Trenton in December 1776.

He commanded the 2nd Pennsylvania Brigade at Brandywine and Paoli in September 1777. After bringing charges against Anthony Wayne for Paoli, he led the 2nd Brigade at Germantown in October. He was present at Monmouth and assumed command of the 10th Pennsylvania Regiment shortly afterward.

In January 1781, he took command of the 6th Pennsylvania Regiment and two years later he transferred to lead the 2nd Pennsylvania Regiment. He received a brevet promotion to brigadier general in September 1783 and retired to his farm.

He later served as adjutant general of the state militia and was a member of the Society of the Cincinnati.

== Death an interment ==
Humpton died in 1804 and was buried in the Friends Meeting cemetery in Caln Township, Chester County, Pennsylvania.
