= 5th Pennsylvania Regiment =

- Active: 1775–1783
- Allegiance: Continental Congress of the United States
- Type: Infantry
- Part of: Pennsylvania Line
- Engagements: Battle of Brandywine (1777); Battle of Paoli (1777); Battle of Germantown (1777); Battle of Monmouth (1778); Battle of Springfield (1780); Battle of Green Spring (1781); Siege of Yorktown (1781)

Commanders
- Notable commanders: Colonel Francis Johnston; Colonel Richard Butler

The 5th Pennsylvania Regiment, first known as the 4th Pennsylvania Battalion, was raised December 9, 1775, at Chester, Pennsylvania, for service with the Continental Army. The regiment would see action at Brandywine, Paoli, Germantown, Monmouth, Springfield, Green Spring, and Yorktown. The regiment was disbanded on January 1, 1783.

The regiment was known for wearing blue uniforms with white facings along with a leather jockey cap or light infantryman's cap if available. Scarlet trousers were very popular for unknown reasons exclusively to the 5th. Some historians believe it is in relation to marking themselves as veterans of Paoli.

By 1780 the light infantry battalions of the 5th were dressed in full white hunting suits with red feathered blue jockey caps lined white.

== Notable soldiers ==
Philip Sailor fought for the unit during the Battles of Brandywine, Paoli, Germantown, and Monmouth, despite all battles being heavy losses for the American side. He later established a legendary legacy to grace the American populous.
