= 10th Pennsylvania Regiment =

Continental Army infantry regiment

- Active: 1776–1781
- Allegiance: Continental Congress of the United States
- Branch: Infantry
- Size: 8–9 companies
- Part of: Pennsylvania Line
- Engagements: American Revolutionary War: Battle of Brandywine (1777); Battle of Paoli (1777); Battle of Germantown (1777); Battle of Monmouth (1778); Battle of Springfield (1780); Battle of Bull's Ferry (1780)

Commanders
- Notable commanders: Colonel Joseph Penrose; Colonel George Nagel; Colonel Richard Humpton

The 10th Pennsylvania Regiment was an American infantry unit that served in the Continental Army during the American Revolutionary War. Raised in September 1776 in the strength of eight companies, it was assigned to George Washington's main army in December 1776. Led by Colonel Joseph Penrose, the regiment fought under Thomas Mifflin at Princeton. In 1777 the unit was in action at Brandywine, Paoli, and Germantown during the time Adam Hubley was lieutenant colonel. At Monmouth in June 1778 Colonel George Nagel was in command. A few days after Monmouth, the regiment absorbed the 11th Pennsylvania Regiment and Colonel Richard Humpton took over the unit, which grew to nine companies in size. In 1780 the 10th fought at Springfield and Bull's Ferry. In January 1781 the 10th Pennsylvania merged with the 1st Pennsylvania Regiment and ceased to exist.

== History ==
The 10th Pennsylvania Regiment was raised on 16 September 1776 at Philadelphia, Pennsylvania, for service with the Continental Army. The regiment saw action during the Battle of Brandywine, Battle of Paoli, Battle of Germantown, Battle of Monmouth, Battle of Springfield, and Battle of Bull's Ferry. The regiment was disbanded on January 17, 1781, at Trenton, New Jersey.
