= 7th Pennsylvania Regiment =

Continental Army infantry regiment

- Active: 4 January 1776–17 January 1781
- Allegiance: (United States) Continental Congress
- Type: Infantry
- Part of: Pennsylvania Line
- Engagements: Lake Champlain (1776); Battle of Brandywine (1777); Battle of Paoli (1777); Battle of Germantown (1777); Battle of Monmouth (1778); Battle of Springfield (1780); Battle of Bull's Ferry (1780)

Commanders
- Notable commanders: Colonel William Irvine

The 7th Pennsylvania Regiment was an infantry unit raised on 4 January 1776 at Carlisle, Pennsylvania for service with the Continental Army under Brigadier General Anthony Wayne during the American Revolutionary War. The well known iron work owner and cannon supplier Samuel Van Leer was a captain in this regiment. On 17 January 1777 Lieutenant Colonel Thomas Hartley transferred out of the unit to take command of Hartley's Additional Continental Regiment. The 7th Regiment saw action at the battles of Brandywine, Paoli, Germantown, Monmouth, Springfield and Bull's Ferry. At Monmouth, Colonel William Irvine led the regiment. The unit merged with the 4th Pennsylvania Regiment on 17 January 1781.
