= Patton's Additional Continental Regiment =

- Active: 1777–1779
- Allegiance: (United States) Continental Congress
- Type: Infantry
- Size: 7 companies
- Part of: Continental Army
- Engagements: Northern New Jersey (1777); Battle of Brandywine (1777); Battle of Germantown (1777); Battle of Monmouth (1778)

Commanders
- Notable commanders: Colonel John Patton

Patton's Additional Continental Regiment was an American infantry unit that existed for two years during the American Revolutionary War. Authorized on 11 January 1777, the unit was recruited from the colonies of Pennsylvania, New Jersey, and Delaware. Raised by Colonel John Patton in early 1777, it saw service with the Continental Army during the Philadelphia Campaign. In January 1779 the regiment was absorbed by Hartley's Additional Continental Regiment, except for one company which joined the 1st Delaware Regiment.

== History ==
Patton's Additional Continental Regiment was authorized on 11 January 1777 for service with the Continental Army and assigned to the main army. John Patton was appointed colonel of the regiment. Patton had distinguished himself in command of one battalion of the Pennsylvania State Rifle Regiment during the New York and New Jersey Campaign. George Washington allowed the colonels of his Additional Regiments considerable authority to select their officers. Assistant Quartermaster General John Parke was named lieutenant colonel while Brigade Major Peter Scull accepted the position of major.

Patton's Additional Continental Regiment was organized in the spring of 1777 of men from Pennsylvania, New Jersey, and Delaware. The unit had a strength of seven companies. On 22 May the regiment was assigned to the 4th Virginia Brigade, which was commanded by Charles Scott. It took part in the June 1777 campaign in Northern New Jersey and the Philadelphia Campaign in late 1777.

At the Battle of Monmouth on 28 June 1778, the regiment was led by Lieutenant Colonel Parke. The unit fought in William Grayson's 600-man and two-gun detachment together with David Cook's company of the 3rd Continental Artillery Regiment, Grayson's Additional Continental Regiment, and the converged 4th, 8th, and 12th Virginia Regiments under James Woods. Charles Lee ordered Grayson's detachment to lead his Advanced Guard in the approach march to Monmouth Courthouse. Lee placed Grayson, Henry Jackson's detachment and Richard Butler's detachment, and Eleazer Oswald's four guns under Anthony Wayne. Between 9:30 and 10:00 AM, Wayne's group engaged in a somewhat confused skirmish with the British rear guard. At this point, the British commander Sir Henry Clinton mounted a powerful counterattack with 6,000 men and Lee lost control of his division, which began to retreat. To his amazement, Washington saw Lee's troops retreating toward him, led by Grayson's and Patton's Regiments. After Washington and his generals organized a new battle line, Lee's division regrouped behind the main body and the second half of the battle began.

Patton's Regiment transferred from the 4th Virginia Brigade to the Highlands Department on 22 July 1778. The regiment ceased to exist on 13 January 1779 when it consolidated with Hartley's Additional Continental Regiment. The exception was Captain Allen McLane's Delaware company which separated from Patton's Regiment on 16 December 1778 and joined the 1st Delaware Regiment in the 3rd Virginia Brigade. On 13 July 1779, McLane's company transferred to Lee's Legion as the 4th Dismounted Troop.

== Service record ==
Designation	Date	Brigade	Department
Patton's Additional Regiment	11 January 1777	none	Main Army
Patton's Additional Regiment	22 May 1777	4th Virginia	Main Army
Patton's Additional Regiment	22 July 1778	none	Highlands
Patton's Additional Regiment	13 January 1779	none	consolidated

== Bibliography ==
- Boatner, Mark M. III (1994). Encyclopedia of the American Revolution. Mechanicsburg, Pa.: Stackpole Books. ISBN 0-8117-0578-1.
- Morrissey, Brendan (2008). Monmouth Courthouse 1778: The last great battle in the North. Long Island City, N.Y.: Osprey Publishing. ISBN 978-1-84176-772-7.
- Wright, Robert K. Jr. (1989). The Continental Army. Washington, D.C.: United States Army Center of Military History. CMH Pub 60-4.
