= 3rd Pennsylvania Regiment =

- Active: 1775–1783
- Allegiance: (United States) Continental Congress
- Type: Infantry
- Part of: Pennsylvania Line
- Engagements: Battle of Valcour Island (1776); Battle of Brandywine (1777); Battle of Germantown (1777); Battle of Monmouth (1778); Battle of Springfield (1780)

Commanders
- Notable commanders: Colonel Arthur St. Clair; Colonel Thomas Craig

The 3rd Pennsylvania Regiment, first known as the 2nd Pennsylvania Battalion, was raised on December 9, 1775, at Philadelphia, Pennsylvania for service with the Continental Army. The regiment would see action during the Battle of Valcour Island, Battle of Brandywine, Battle of Germantown, Battle of Monmouth and the Battle of Springfield. The regiment was furloughed, on June 11, 1783, in Philadelphia, and disbanded on November 15, 1783.
