= 4th Pennsylvania Regiment =

Continental Army infantry regiment

- Active: 1775–1783
- Allegiance: Continental Congress of the United States
- Type: Infantry
- Part of: Pennsylvania Line
- Engagements: Battle of Fort Washington (1776); Battle of Brandywine (1777); Battle of Paoli (1777); Battle of Germantown (1777); Battle of Monmouth (1778); Sullivan Expedition (1779)

Commanders
- Notable commanders: Colonel Anthony Wayne; Colonel John Shee; Colonel Daniel Brodhead; Colonel William Butler

The 4th Pennsylvania Regiment, first known as the 3rd Pennsylvania Battalion, was raised on December 9, 1775, at Philadelphia, Pennsylvania, for service with the Continental Army. The regiment was assigned to Thomas Mifflin's brigade in the main army on June 26, 1776. Part of the unit was captured at Fort Washington on November 16, 1776. The regiment fought at Brandywine, Paoli, Germantown, Monmouth and the Sullivan Expedition. The regiment was furloughed on January 17, 1781, at Trenton, New Jersey and disbanded on January 1, 1783.
