= 1st Pennsylvania Regiment =

Military unit of the American Continental Army

- Active: 1775 – 1783
- Allegiance: Continental Congress of the United States
- Type: Infantry
- Part of: Pennsylvania Line
- Nicknames: Thompsons Rifle Regiment; Hand's PA Rifle Regiment; P.M.I.R.(PA militia I Regiment); 1st Continental Regiment
- Motto: I Refuse To Be Subjugated
- Colors: Green with Red Facings/Hunting shirt, cap with White trim Dark Blue and Scarlet facings regulation post Valley Forge
- Engagements: Siege of Boston; Battle of Trenton; Second Battle of Trenton; Battle of Princeton; Battle of Brandywine; Battle of Matson's Ford; Battle of Germantown; Battle of Monmouth; Battle of Springfield; Battle of Stony Point

Commanders
- Notable commanders: Colonel William Thompson; Colonel Edward Hand; Colonel James Chambers

The 1st Pennsylvania Regiment - originally mustered as the 1st Pennsylvania Rifles; also known as the 1st Continental Line and 1st Continental Regiment, was raised under the command of Colonel William Thompson for service in the Continental Army.

== History ==
The Congressional resolution of June 14, 1775 authorized ten companies of expert riflemen to be raised for one-year enlistments as Continental Army troops. Maryland and Virginia were to raise two companies each, and Pennsylvania was charged with raising six. However, Pennsylvania frontiersman were so eager to participate that, on June 22, Pennsylvania's quota of six was increased to eight, organized as a regiment known as the "Pennsylvania Rifle Regiment." A ninth company was added to the regiment on July 11. All thirteen companies were sent to Washington's army at Boston for use as light infantry and later as special reserve forces.

Seven companies of the regiment (1st, 2nd, 3rd, 4th, 5th, 8th, and 9th) were made up of Scotch-Irish, Germans, Welsh, Manx, Free Quakers, along with loyal English whigs; from Lancaster; the 6th and 7th companies were mostly men of German and Dutch American descent, from Berks and Northampton counties. Their standard weapon was the long rifle, which had greater range and accuracy than the muskets used by most of the British Army and Continental Army, but less weight of shot, slower rate of fire, and were without bayonets, making the regiment unsuitable for line-of-battle.

Doctor James Thacher, a young doctor from Barnstable who observed the regiment during many of its battles, provided this description of the riflemen:

They are remarkably stout and hardy men; many of them exceeding six feet in height. They are dressed in white frocks or rifle shirts and round hats. There men are remarkable for the accuracy of their aim; striking a mark with great certainty at two hundred yards distance. At a review, a company of them, while in a quick advance, fired their balls into objects of seven inches diameter at the distance of 250 yards . . . their shot have frequently proved fatal to British officers and soldiers who expose themselves to view at more than double the distance of common musket shot. (Source: James Thacher, "Military Journal during the American Revolutionary War from 1775 to 1783".)

As described under "colours", the regiment in 1776 wore green hunting shirts with black caps, trimmed white, adorned with feather(s) while the officers wore green coats with red facings and similar caps. By the Battle of Boston and by regulation at Valley Forge, blue coats with red facings were issued to the regiment, while most of the regiment's Riflemen continued to wear hunting shirts until wars end.

The regiment served in the New York and New Jersey campaign, seeing action at the battles of Trenton, Assunpink Creek and Princeton. At the battle of Brandywine, the regiment was led by Colonel James Chambers and assigned to Colonel Thomas Hartley's 1st Pennsylvania Brigade. Under the direction of the division's action commander, Brigadier General Anthony Wayne, the regiment fought near Chadds Ford where it held the "post of honor", the far right flank of the division. At the battle of Germantown, the regiment was brigaded with the 2nd, 7th, and 10th Pennsylvania Regiments, again being placed on the division's extreme right flank just east of Germantown Road. The regiment fought in the battle of Matson's Ford on December 11, 1777. In the same year, Robert Blackwell became the chaplain and surgeon of the regiment, despite having no medical experience.

The unit also fought at the battle of Monmouth in 1778 and the battle of Springfield in 1780. Two companies of the regiment, those of Captain William Hendricks and Captain Matthew Smith, had accompanied Benedict Arnold's expedition to Quebec in 1775 and were captured in the battle of Quebec. The regiment was furloughed June 11, 1783 at Philadelphia and disbanded on November 15. Company C of the United States Army's 337th Engineer Battalion claims lineage from Captain Michael Doudeis' company of York, Pennsylvania of the 1st Pennsylvania Regiment.

== See also ==
- David Harris (American Revolution)
