= Battle of Paoli =

1777 battle of the Philadelphia campaign

- Part of the Philadelphia campaign
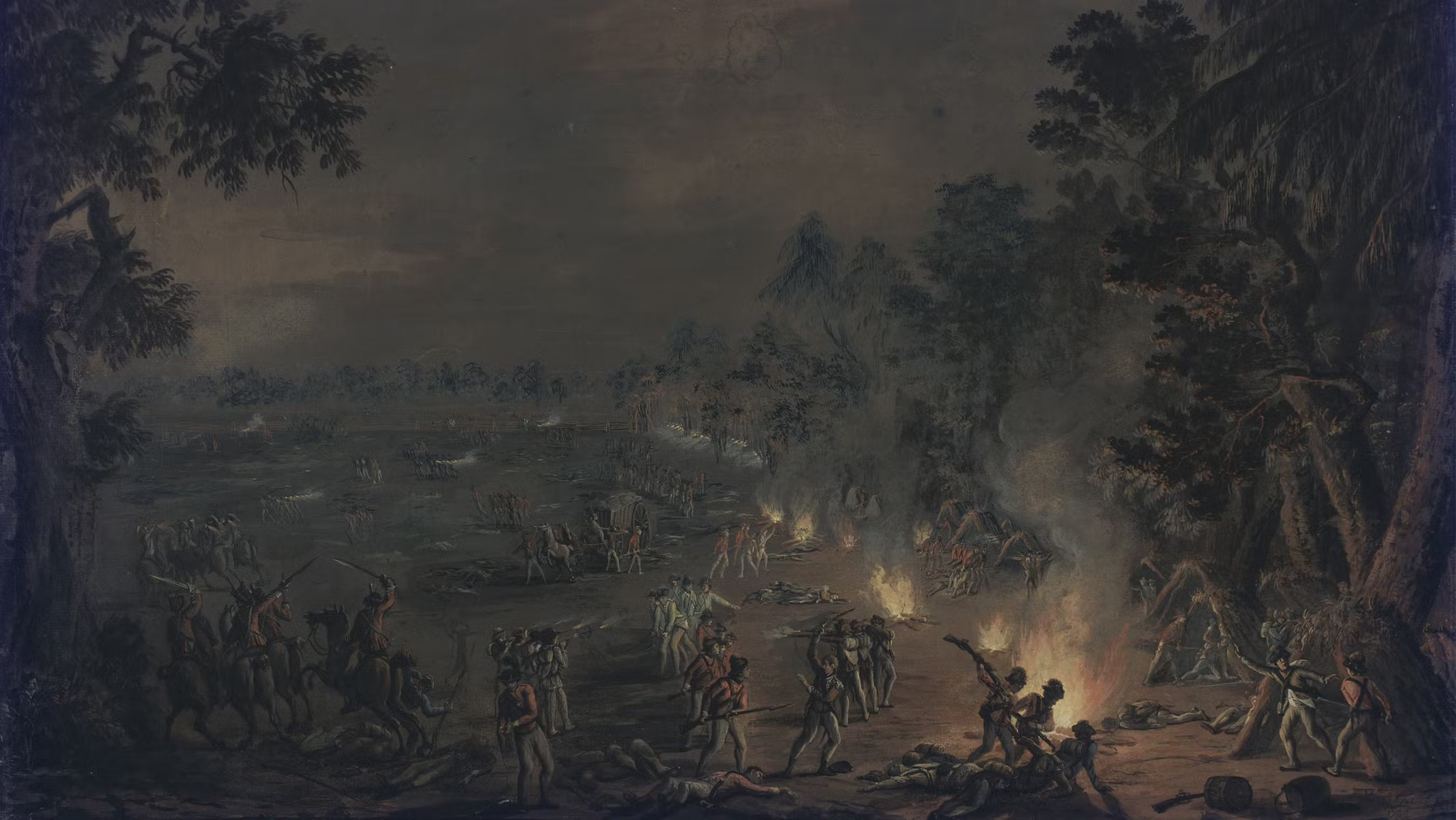
- 1782 painting of the battle
Date	September 20, 1777
Location	Near modern-day Malvern, Pennsylvania
Result	British victory

Belligerents
Great Britain	United States

Commanders and leaders
Charles Grey	Anthony Wayne

Strength
1,200 regulars	1,500 regulars; 1,000 militia

Casualties and losses
4 killed; 7 wounded	52 killed; 149 wounded; 71 captured

- Paoli Battlefield Site and Parade Grounds
- U.S. National Register of Historic Places
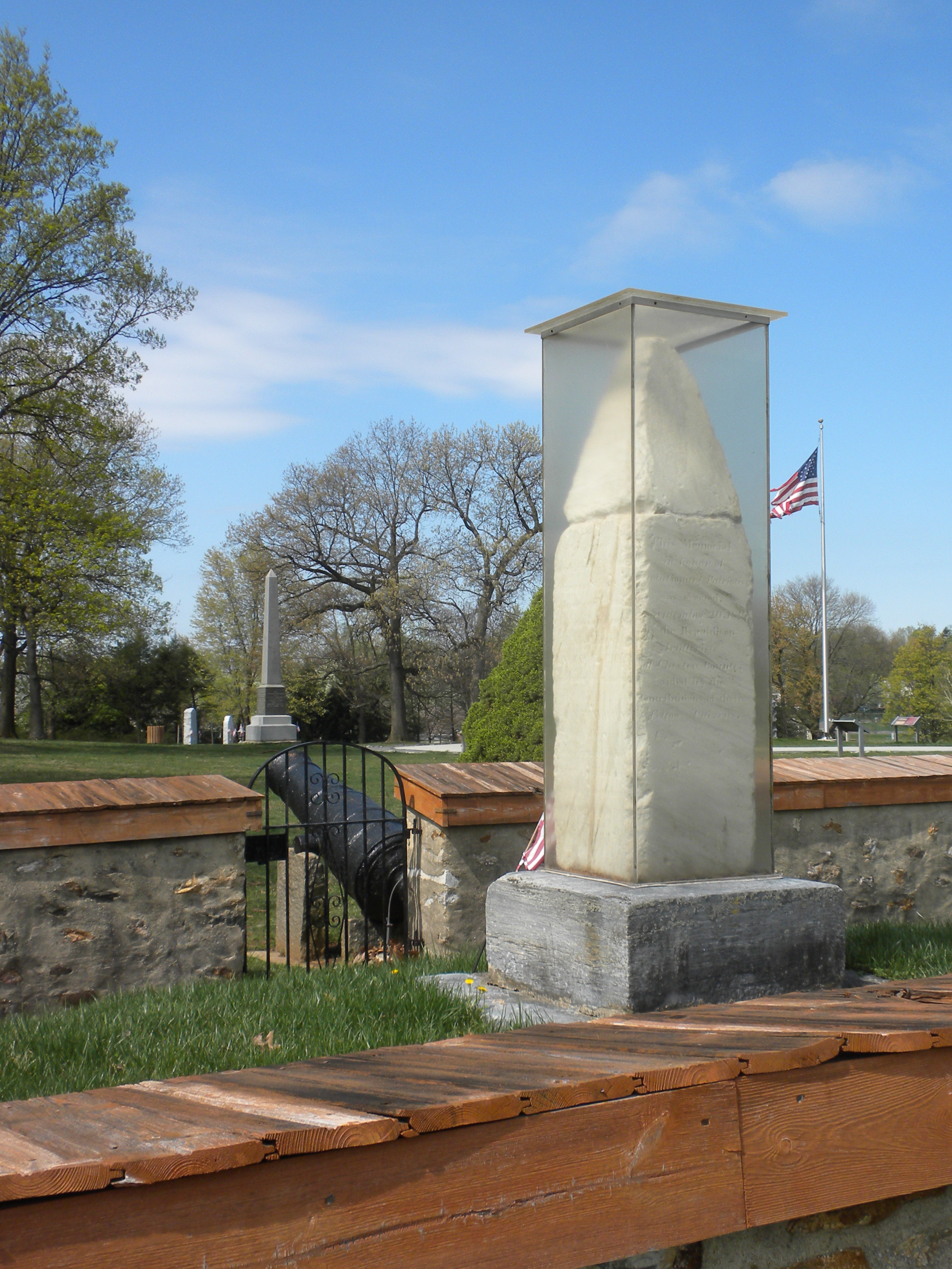
- The Battle of Paoli monument in present-day Malvern, Pennsylvania

- Location within Pennsylvania Location within the United States
- Location: Roughly bounded by Warren, and Monument Aves. and Sugartown Rd., Malvern, Pennsylvania, U.S.
- Coordinates: 40°01′47″N 75°31′06″W
- Area: 62.2 acres (25.2 ha)
- Built: 1817, 1877
- Architect: John T. Windrim, Palmer C. Hughes
- Architectural style: Colonial Revival, Late 19th and 20th century Revivals
- NRHP reference No.: 97001248
- Added to NRHP: October 23, 1997

The Battle of Paoli (also known as the Battle of Paoli Tavern or the Paoli Massacre) was fought on September 20, 1777, near present-day Malvern, Pennsylvania as part of the Philadelphia campaign of the American Revolutionary War. Following the Continental Army's retreat due to the Battle of Brandywine and the aborted Battle of the Clouds, General George Washington left a force of 1,500 regulars and 1,000 militia behind under Brigadier General Anthony Wayne to monitor and resist advancing British forces as they prepared to attack the American capital of Philadelphia.

On the evening of September 20, 1,200 British regulars under Major-general Charles Grey led a surprise attack on Wayne's encampment, which was located near a tavern known as the Paoli Tavern. Approaching the encampment silently, the British quietly eliminated American sentries before charging into the camp in three waves. The Americans were caught off guard and suffered heavy casualties while retreating. Due to American propagandists making false claims that the British gave no quarter to Wayne's troops, the engagement came to be known among Americans as the "Paoli Massacre".

== Background ==
After the American defeat at the Battle of Brandywine on September 11, 1777, General Washington was intent on accomplishing two tasks. He wanted to protect the revolutionary capital of Philadelphia from British forces under the command of Lieutenant General Sir William Howe and also shield his inland supply depots at Reading, which was 60 miles (97 km) northwest of Philadelphia, and at Lancaster, which was 65 miles (105 km) west of Philadelphia. Washington withdrew across the Schuylkill River on September 12, bypassing Philadelphia and heading northwest to the Falls of Schuylkill in the present-day East Falls section of Philadelphia.

After resting for a full day and refitting, Washington's army again crossed the Schuylkill River at Levering's Ford in present-day Manayunk on September 14 to face the British, who had moved little since Brandywine due to a shortage of wagons to carry their wounded and baggage. After the Battle of the Clouds, an ultimately aborted engagement due to bad weather on September 16, Washington withdrew to Yellow Springs and Reading Furnace in northern Chester County to replenish his ammunition. He left Brigadier General Anthony Wayne's Pennsylvania Division at Yellow Springs in present-day Chester Springs. When the British columns moved towards the Schuylkill River, Wayne followed Washington's orders to harass the British and attempt to capture all or part of their baggage train.

Wayne assumed that his presence was undetected and camped close to the British lines 2 miles (3.2 km) from Paoli Tavern in Paoli. Wayne's division consisted of the 1st, 2nd, 4th, 5th, 7th, 8th, 10th and 11th Pennsylvania Regiments, Hartley's additional Continental Regiment, an attached artillery company and a small force of dragoons. The various regiments and units amounted to approximately 1,500 men. Several miles to the west and moving to join Wayne was William Smallwood's Maryland militia, who had approximately 2,100 inexperienced troops under his command.

The British heard rumors that Wayne was in the area, and Howe dispatched scouts, who reported his location to be near the Paoli Tavern and Warren Tavern in present-day Malvern on September 19. Since his position was just 4 miles (6.4 km) from the British camp in Tredyffrin Township, Howe immediately planned an attack on Wayne's camp.

== Battle ==
At 10 p.m. on September 20, British Major-general Charles Grey marched his forces from their camp and launched a surprise attack on Wayne's camp above the Warren Tavern in present-day Malvern not far from the General Paoli Tavern. Grey's troops included the 2nd Light Infantry, a composite battalion formed from the light companies of 13 regiments, plus the 42nd Royal Highland Regiment and 44th Regiment of Foot. A dozen troopers of the 16th Queen's Light Dragoons were in the vanguard of the main British column. Altogether, Grey's force numbered approximately 1,200 men.

To ensure that the Americans were not alerted, Grey ordered his troops to advance in silence with muskets unloaded and attack with bayonets alone. In the case that loads could not be drawn from weapons, he ordered that the flints should be removed instead, earning the Grey the epithet "No Flint". Major John Maitland, commanding officer of the 2nd Light Infantry battalion, was given permission to advance with muskets loaded, giving his personal assurance that his men could be relied on not to fire.

Earlier, Wayne received two warnings of a possible attack and sent out mounted sentries, who spotted the British force two miles from the camp and gave the alarm. Reaching Warren Tavern, Grey's troops forced a local blacksmith to guide them and approached the camp silently along heavily wooded roads, where they encountered an American sentry post. Most of the American sentries fired into the dark, exposing their position and were annihilated by the silent British vanguard. In the camp up the hill from the pickets, Wayne's troops were already formed up and armed. Hearing the firing from the picket on the right, the main body of Wayne's force began moving west out of camp in a column through well-fenced fields when a disabled cannon blocked the avenue of escape for several minutes. With loud battle cries, the British stormed into the camp in three waves: the 2nd Light Infantry in the lead, followed by the 44th and the 42nd, and light dragoons sweeping across the camp. Some of Wayne's troops fired in the direction of the British attack, exposing their positions in the dark; the rear of Wayne's column was silhouetted by their campfires. Some fired into each other and the ensuing chaos caused troops in that part of the line to panic and run. Wayne organized a rearguard defense, but many of his troops fled from the camp and were pursued for a mile or two. Near White Horse Tavern, the British encountered William Smallwood's forces and routed it as well.

With only four British killed and seven wounded, the British routed an entire American division. American casualties from the battle are more uncertain. Historian Thomas J. McGuire says that 53 dead Americans were buried on the battlefield but "whether these were all of the American dead or only those found on the campsite-battlefield is uncertain". Local tradition says that eight more American (and some British) soldiers killed in the battle were buried at St. Peter's Church in the Great Valley, an Anglican church. An estimated 71 prisoners were taken by the British, 40 of whom were so badly wounded that they had to be left behind in nearby houses. According to McGuire, a total of 272 men were killed, wounded, or missing from Wayne's division after the battle. McGuire reports that on the day after the battle, 52 dead Americans were buried, and another body was found later. Among the buried, 39 are unnamed. The highest ranking American officer killed was Major Mareen Lamar (sometimes misspelled Marien).

== Aftermath ==
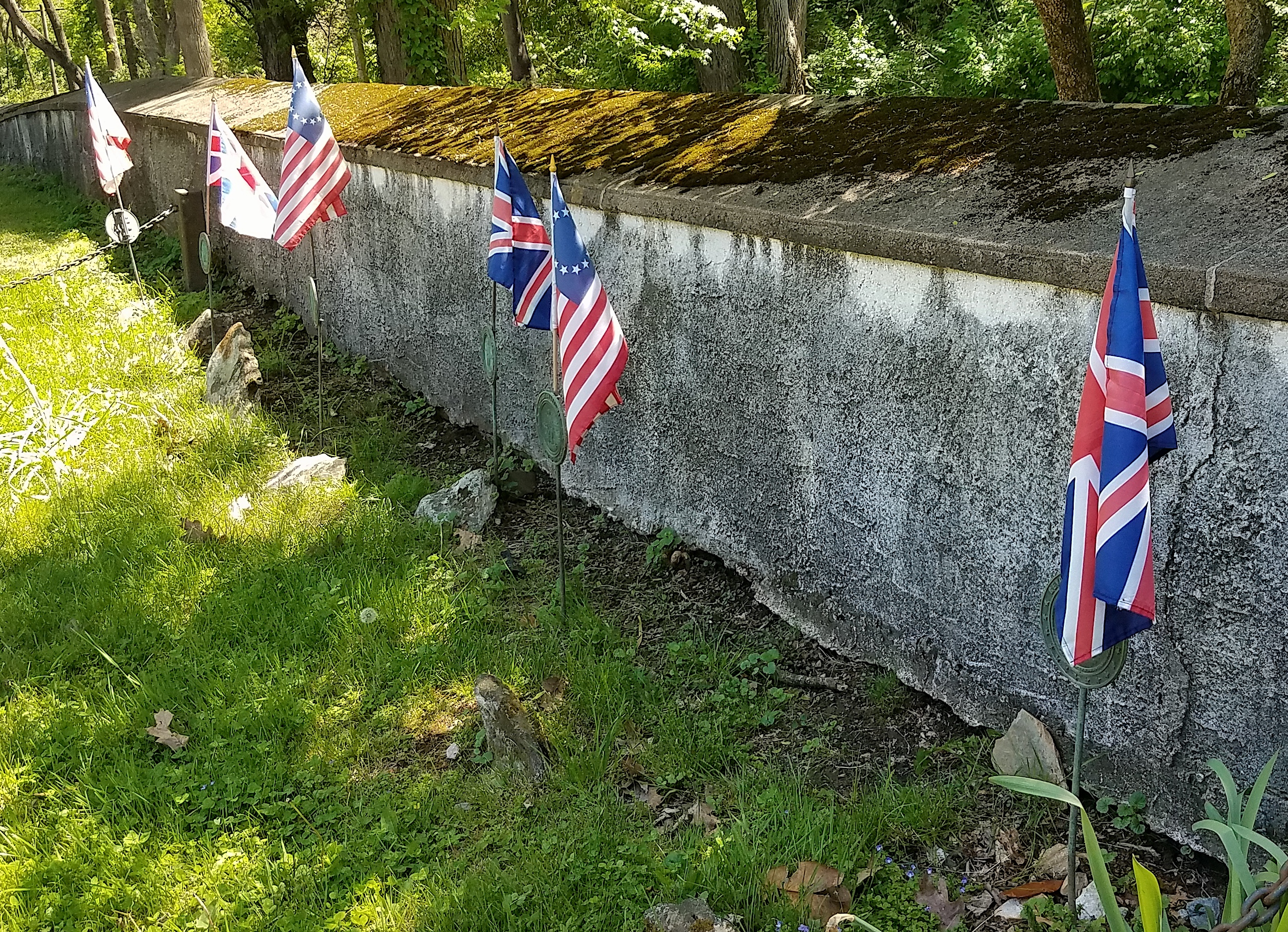
The common gravesite of British and American soldiers killed in the Battle of Paoli in the churchyard of St. Peter's Church in the Great Valley

An official inquiry found that Wayne was not guilty of misconduct but that he had made a tactical error. Wayne was enraged and demanded a full court-martial. On November 1, a board of 13 officers overruled the inquiry's initial report, concluding that Wayne had acted with honor.

The incident gained notoriety partly because of accounts by supposed eyewitnesses, who claimed that the British had bayoneted or mutilated Americans as they were attempting to surrender. Reports included the following:

I with my own Eyes, see them, cut & hack some of our poor Men to pieces after they had fallen in their hands and scarcely shew the least Mercy to any...:— Lt. Col. Adam Hubley, 10th Pennsylvania Regiment

...more than a dozen soldiers had with fixed bayonets formed a cordon round him, and that everyone of them in sport had indulged their brutal ferocity by stabbing him in different parts of his body and limbs...a physician...examining him there was found..46 distinct bayonet wounds...:— William Hutchinson, Pennsylvania Militiaman

The Enemy last Night at twelve o'clock attacked...Our Men just raised from Sleep, moved disorderly — Confusion followed...The Carnage was very great...this is a bloody Month:— Col. Thomas Hartley, 1st Pennsylvania Regiment

The Annals of the Age Cannot Produce such another Scene of Butchery...:— Maj. Samuel Hay, 7th Pennsylvania Regiment

American military historian Mark M. Boatner III refuted these allegations, writing:

American propagandists succeeded in whipping up anti-British sentiment with false accusations that Grey's men had refused quarter and massacred defenseless patriots who tried to surrender...The "no quarter" charge is refuted by the fact that the British took 71 prisoners. The "mangled dead" is explained by the fact that the bayonet is a messy weapon.

Wayne's troops swore revenge and "Remember Paoli!" was used by them as a battle cry at the Battles of Germantown and Stony Point.

To show their defiance, the men of the 2nd Light Infantry dyed their hat feathers red so the Americans would be able to identify them. In 1833, the Light Company of the 46th Regiment of Foot were authorized to wear red cap distinctions instead of the regulation Light Infantry green in commemoration of this gesture.

In 1934, the Royal Berkshire Regiment, which carried on the traditions of the 49th Foot, were authorized to wear a red distinction in their head dress although, misleadingly, this was granted "to commemorate the role of the Light Company at the battle of Brandywine Creek". In the second half of the 20th century, the descendants of both regiments wore red backing to their cap badges and did so until 2006 when The Light Infantry and the Royal Gloucestershire, Berkshire and Wiltshire Regiment were absorbed by The Rifles.

== Monument ==
In 1877, a granite monument was erected at the site of the battle to replace an 1817 monument that was in poor condition; the Paoli monument inscription replicates the words of the 1817 monument on one side. It stands 22.5 feet (6.9 m) tall and is inscribed on all four sides and is located in a local park in Malvern that was added to the National Register of Historic Places in 1997 as the Paoli Battlefield Site and Parade Grounds.

The battlefield and parade grounds include two contributing buildings, two contributing sites, and five contributing objects on its listing with the National Register of Historic Places, including the Paoli battlefield site, the Paoli parade grounds, the Paoli Massacre Monument (erected in 1817), the Paoli Massacre obelisk (erected in 1877), a World War I monument (erected in 1928), a World War II urn (erected circa 1946), and caretaker's house and garage (built in 1922).

== See also ==
- American Revolutionary War § British northern strategy fails, which places the Battle of Paoli in overall sequence and strategic context within the American Revolutionary War.
