= Germans in the American Revolution =

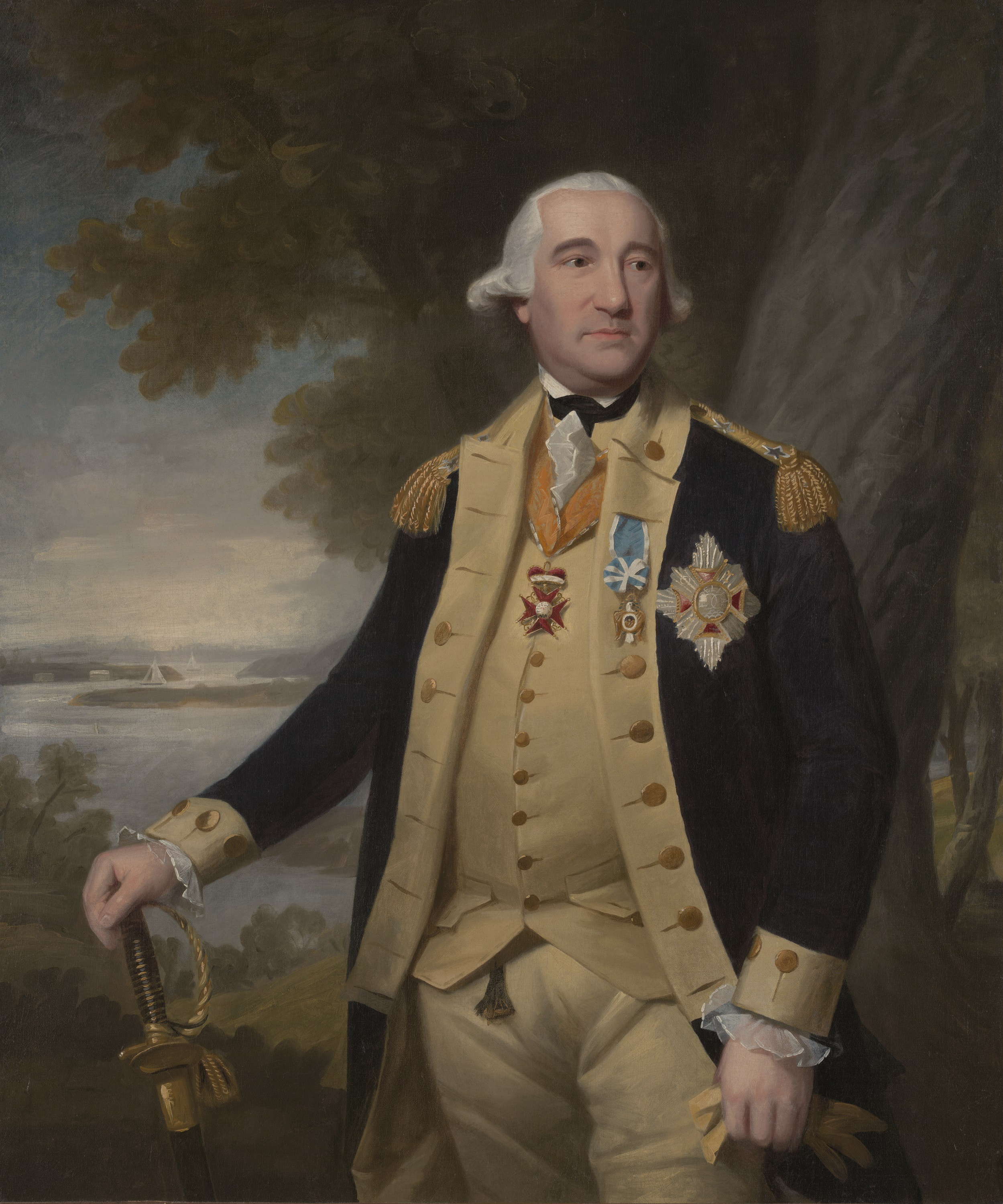
Friedrich Wilhelm von Steuben was a Prussian army captain who became an American general. As the inspector general of George Washington's Continental Army he taught the essentials of military drill and discipline.

People of German ancestry fought on both sides in the American Revolution. Many of the small Holy Roman Empire states in Europe supported the British. King George III of Britain was simultaneously the ruler of the German Electorate of Hanover. Around 30,000 Germans fought for the British during the war, around 25% of British land forces. In particular, 12,000 Hessian soldiers served as Auxiliaries on the side of British. However some Germans who were supporters of Congress as individuals crossed the Atlantic to help the Patriots.

Inside America, German Americans were largely concentrated in Pennsylvania and upstate New York. The majority supported Congress and the patriot cause. Very few German Americans were Loyalists, although many of the religious sects (such as the Amish) were neutral. It is estimated that nearly 5,000 of the German auxiliaries permanently settled in the United States.

== European allies of Britain ==
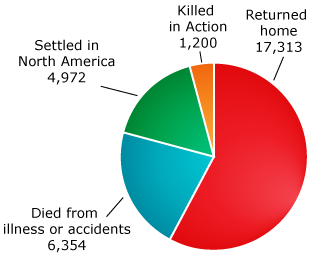
Fate of the German auxiliaries who fought in the American Revolutionary War

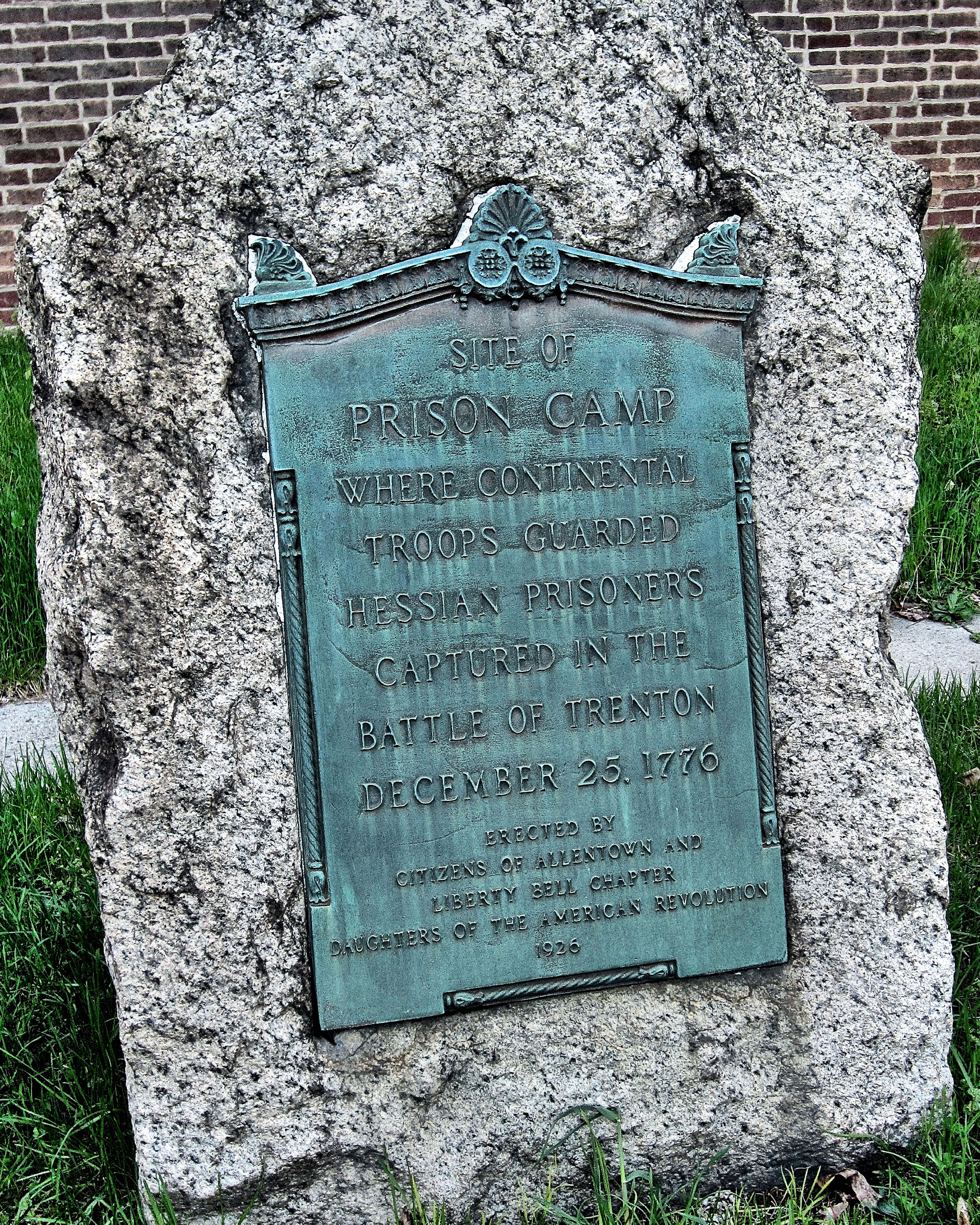
This memorial at Jordan and Gordon Streets in Allentown, Pennsylvania, marks the location where Hessian prisoners of war were held by General George Washington and the Continental Army during the American Revolutionary War.

Germans in Europe lived in numerous separate states. Some of these states had been in alliance with Britain during the Seven Years' War, and were eager to assist Great Britain. Britain had used auxiliary forces in every one of its previous wars that century, so using them to suppress rebellion in the Thirteen Colonies seemed consistent with that policy, but their use against British subjects was controversial. Nevertheless, despite British Whig opposition to using German soldiers to subjugate the "sons of Englishmen," Parliament overwhelmingly approved the measure in order to quickly raise the forces need to suppress the rebellion.

The leasing of soldiers to a foreign power was also controversial to some Europeans, but the people of these continental states generally took great pride in their soldiers' service in the war. Prussia notably rejected the request to send soldiers. Germans living in America did not enlist in the auxiliary units but some enlisted in British units. The 60th (Royal American) Regiment recruited from both the Americas and from Germany.

The sudden demand to rent thousands of auxiliaries placed a burden on recruiters. Base standards had to be met, including a minimum height and number of teeth required to operate flintlock muskets. Recruiters could be forced to pay losses due to desertion or loss of equipment. As many as 40,000 German auxiliaries were sent to fight in the North American theater, the Great Siege of Gibraltar, the Invasion of Minorca, and the Mysore, as well as in South Africa. In North America, German units accounted for more than a third of British forces.

Americans were appalled at the arrival of hired German fighters. Several American representatives to Continental bodies declared they would be willing to declare independence if King George used such soldiers against them. The hired German troops were referred to as mercenaries by the patriots. Patriot outrage was also reflected in the Declaration of Independence:

He is at this time transporting large Armies of foreign Mercenaries to compleat the works of death, desolation, and tyranny, already begun with circumstances of Cruelty & perfidy scarcely paralleled in the most barbarous ages, and totally unworthy the Head of a civilized nation.

— United States Declaration of Independence

Colonial-era jurists did draw a distinction between auxiliaries and mercenaries, with auxiliaries serving their prince when sent to the aid of another prince, and mercenaries serving a foreign prince as individuals. By this distinction, the troops which served in the American Revolution were not mercenaries, but auxiliaries. Early Republican historians, however, defended the term "mercenaries" to distinguish the foreign, professional armies from the idealized citizen soldier who altruistically fought for independence. Mercy Otis Warren promoted the idea of German auxiliaries as barbarians, but also as victims of tyranny.

Throughout the war, the United States attempted to entice the hired men to stop fighting. In April 1778, Congress issued a letter, addressed "To the officers and soldiers in the service of the king of Great Britain, not subjects of the said king", which offered land and livestock to defecting German units, in addition to increased rank. At the conclusion of the war, Congress offered incentives—especially free farmland—for these ethnic Germans to remain in the United States. Great Britain also offered land and tax incentives to its Loyalist soldiers willing to settle in Nova Scotia in present-day Canada.

=== Hesse-Kassel ===
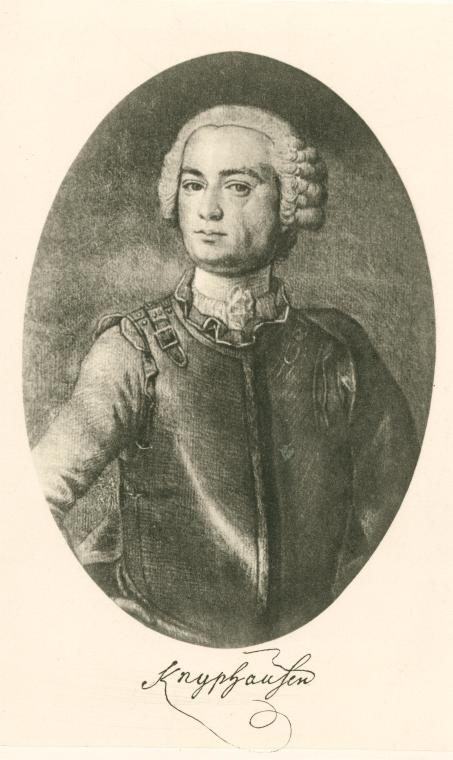
General Wilhelm von Knyphausen, a commanding general of the Hessians who fought alongside the British Army during the American Revolutionary War; American patriots called the Hessians "mercenaries".

The financial basis of some smaller continental states was the regular rental of their regiments to fight for various larger nations during the 18th century. The Landgraviate of Hesse-Kassel, in particular, was economically depressed, and had "rented" out professional armies since the 17th century, with general support from both upper and lower classes. This allowed Hesse-Kassel to maintain a larger standing army, which in turn gave it the ability to play a larger role in European power politics. Hesse-Kassel pressed eligible men into service for up to 20 years, and by mid-18th century, about 7% of the population was in military service. The Hessian army was very well trained and equipped; its troops fought well for whoever was paying their prince.

The Landgraviate of Hesse-Kassel was under Frederick II, a Roman Catholic and an uncle of King George III. He initially provided over 12,000 soldiers to fight in the Americas. Like their British allies, the Hessians had some difficulty acclimatizing to North America; the first troops to arrive suffered from widespread illness, which forced a delay in the attack on Long Island. From 1776 on, Hessian soldiers were incorporated into the British Army serving in North America, and they fought in most of the major battles, including those of New York and New Jersey campaign, the Battle of Germantown, the Siege of Charleston, and the final Siege of Yorktown, where about 1,300 Germans were taken prisoner, although various reports indicate that the Germans were in better spirits than their British counterparts.

Because the majority of the German-speaking troops came from Hesse, modern Americans sometimes refer to all such troops of this war generically as "Hessians". It has been estimated that Hesse-Kassel contributed over 16,000 troops during the course of the Revolutionary War, of whom 6,500 did not return. Hessian officer (later General) Adam Ludwig Ochs estimated that 1,800 Hessian soldiers were killed, but many in the Hessian army intended on staying in America, and remained after the war. Captain Frederick Zeng, for example, served out his term with the armies of Hesse-Kassel and remained in the United States, even becoming an associate of Philip Schuyler.

Hesse-Kassel signed a treaty of alliance with Great Britain to supply fifteen regiments, four grenadier battalions, two jäger companies, and three companies of artillery. The jägers in particular were carefully recruited and well paid, well clothed, and free from manual labor. (Note: Jägers were offered a signing bonus of one Louis d'or coin, which was increased to four Louis d'or as Hesse tried to fill its companies with expert riflemen and woodsmen.) These jägers proved essential in the "Indian style" warfare in America, and Great Britain signed a new treaty in December 1777 in which Hesse-Kassel agreed to increase their number from 260 to 1,066.

German-speaking armies could not quickly replace men lost on the other side of the Atlantic, so the Hessians recruited African-Americans as soldiers, known as Black Hessians. There were 115 black soldiers serving with Hessian units, most of them as drummers or fifers. It is estimated that 20% of the people serving in Hessian units were not Hessians.

Perhaps the best-known officer from Hesse-Kassel is General Wilhelm von Knyphausen, who commanded his troops in several major battles. Other notable officers include Colonel Carl von Donop (mortally wounded at the Battle of Red Bank in 1777) and Colonel Johann Rall, who was fatally wounded at the Battle of Trenton in 1776. Rall's regiment was captured, and many of the soldiers were sent to Pennsylvania to work on farms.

The war proved longer and more difficult than either Great Britain or Hesse-Kassel had anticipated, and the mounting casualties and extended supply lines took a political and economic toll. Following the American Revolution, Hesse-Kassel would end the practice of raising and leasing armies.

=== Hesse-Hanau ===
Hesse-Hanau was a semi-independent appendage of Hesse-Kassel, governed by the Protestant Hereditary Landgrave William, eldest son of the Roman Catholic Frederick II of Hesse-Kassel. When William received news of the Battle of Bunker Hill in 1775, he unconditionally offered a regiment to King George III. During the course of the war, Hanau provided 2,422 troops; only 1,441 returned in 1783. A significant number of Hessian soldiers were volunteers from Hanau, who had enlisted with the intention of staying in the Americas when the war was over.

Colonel Wilhelm von Gall is one well-known officer from Hesse-Hanau; he commanded a regiment from Hanau under General John Burgoyne. Among the units sent to North America were one battalion of infantry, a battalion of jägers, a battalion of irregular infantry known as a Frei-Corps, and a company of artillery.

=== Brunswick-Wolfenbüttel ===
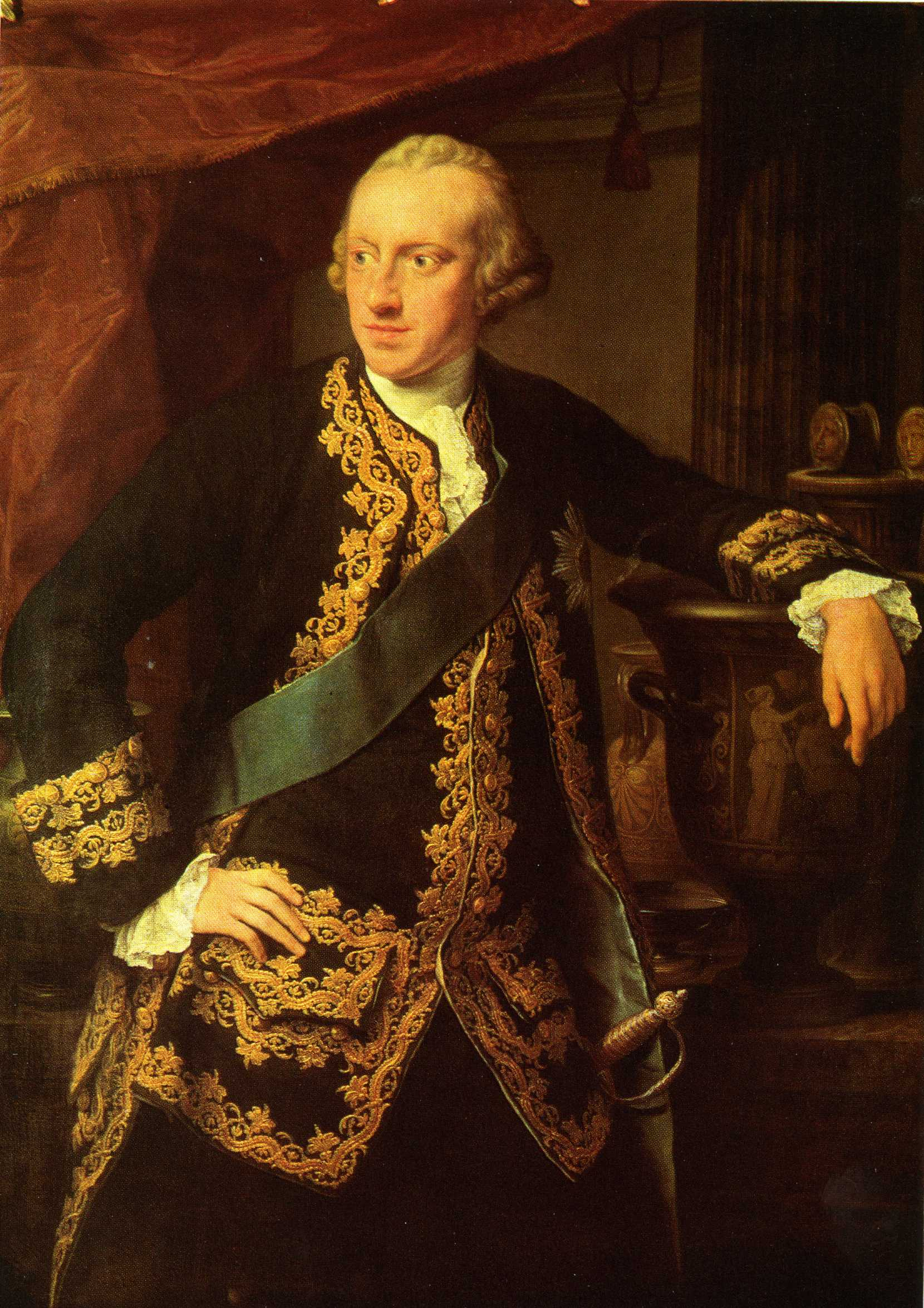
Portrait of the Duke of Brunswick by Pompeo Batoni. Prince Carl of Brunswick-Wolfenbüttel, a brother-in-law of King George III of Great Britain

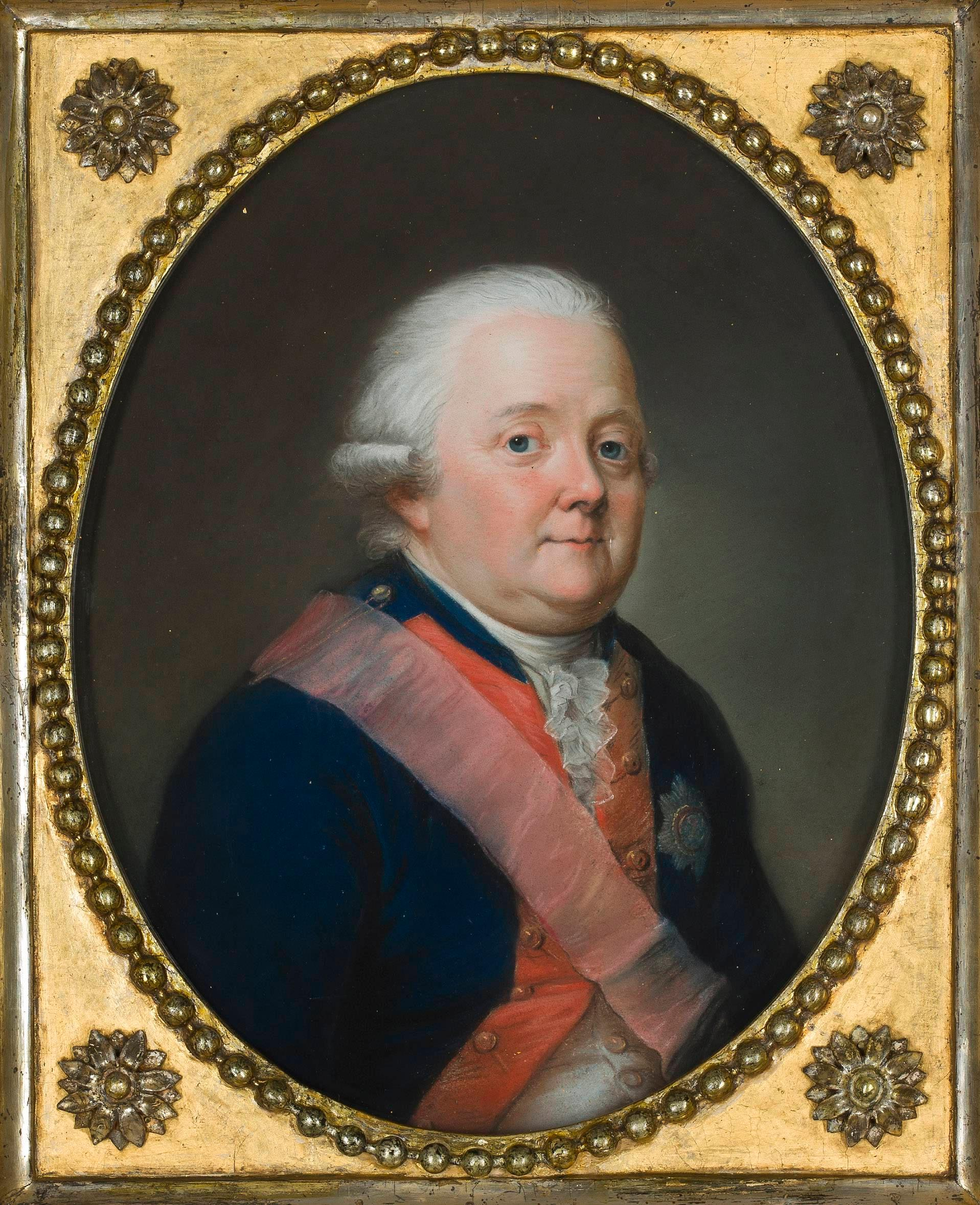
General Friedrich Adolf Riedesel

Brunswick-Lüneburg was a duchy that had been divided into several territories, one of which was ruled by George III as the Electorate of Brunswick-Lüneburg (Hanover). The neighboring Duchy of Brunswick-Wolfenbüttel (Brunswick) was ruled by Duke Charles I of Brunswick-Bevern; his son and heir, Charles William Ferdinand, was married to Princess Augusta of Great Britain, the sister of George III.

In 1775, Charles William Ferdinand ("Prince Carl") told King George III that Brunswick had soldiers who could be used to help put down the rebellion in the Americas. In December 1775, General Friedrich Adolf Riedesel began recruiting in anticipation of the finalized treaty. Brunswick was the first German-speaking state to sign a treaty supporting Great Britain, on 9 January 1776. It agreed to send 4,000 soldiers: four infantry regiments, one grenadier battalion, one dragoon regiment and one light infantry battalion. The Brunswick treaty provided that all troops would be paid in Imperial Thalers – including two months' advance pay, but required that all troops take an oath of service to King George III. A controversial clause in the agreement stipulated that Duke Charles I would be paid £7 and 4s to replace each Brunswick soldier killed in battle- with three wounded men equal to one dead man; Charles, however, would pay to replace any deserters or any soldier who fell sick with anything other than an "uncommon contagious malady."

Duke Charles I provided Great Britain with 4,000 foot soldiers and 350 heavy dragoons (dismounted) (Note: The heavy dragoons from Brunswick did not have horses and performed as foot soldiers. They were expected to acquire horses during the campaign, which led to the Battle of Bennington.) under Lt-Colonel Friedrich Baum, all commanded by General Friedrich Adolf Riedesel.

General Riedesel reorganized the existing Braunschweig regiments into Corps to allow for the additional recruits required by the new treaty. Experienced soldiers were spread among the new companies in the Regiment von Riedesel, Regiment von Rhetz, Regiment Prinz Friedrich, and Regiment von Specht, as well as the Battalion von Barner and dragoons. Braunschweig-Wolfenbüttel, along with Waldeck and Anhalt-Zerbst, was one of the three British auxiliary that avoided impressment, and Karl I vowed not to send Landeskinder (sons of the land) to North America, so land owners were permitted to transfer to units that would remain in Braunschweig. Officers and non-commissioned officers went throughout the Holy Roman Empire recruiting to fill their ranks, offering financial incentives, travel to North America with the potential for economic opportunities in the New World, reduced sentences, and adventure.

These soldiers were the majority of the German-speaking regulars under General John Burgoyne in the Saratoga campaign of 1777, and were generally referred to as "Brunswickers." The combined forces from Brunswick and Hesse-Hanau accounted for nearly half of Burgoyne's army, and the Brunswickers were known for being especially well-trained. One of the ships used to cross Lake Champlain flew a flag of Braunschweig to recognize their significance to the army. Riedesel's Brunswick troops made a notable entry into the Battle of Hubbardton, singing a Lutheran hymn while making a bayonet charge against the American right flank, which may have saved the collapsing British line. Riedesel's wife, Friederike, traveled with her husband and kept a journal which remains an important primary account of the Saratoga campaign. After Burgoyne's surrender, 2,431 Brunswickers were detained as part of the Convention Army until the end of the war.

Brunswick sent 5,723 troops to North America, of whom 3,015 did not return home in the autumn of 1783. Some losses were to death or desertion, but many Brunswickers became familiar with America during their time with the Convention Army, and when the war ended, they were granted permission to stay by both Congress and their officers. Many had taken the opportunity to desert as the Convention Army was twice marched through Pennsylvania German settlements in eastern Pennsylvania. As the Duke of Brunswick received compensation from the British for every one of his soldiers killed in America, it was in his best interest to report the deserters as dead, whenever possible. The Duke even offered six months' pay to soldiers who remained or returned to America. However, Brunswick's decision to send troops to North America was ultimately financially unprofitable, and the new Prince Karl was nearly brought to financial ruin.

=== Ansbach-Bayreuth ===
The dual Margraviates of Brandenburg-Ansbach and Brandenburg-Bayreuth, under Margrave Charles Alexander, initially supplied 1,644 men to the British in two infantry battalions, one company of jägers and one of artillery, of whom 461 did not return home. A total of 2,353 soldiers were sent from Ansbach-Bayreuth, including an entire regiment of jägers. They were described as "the tallest and best-looking regiments of all those here," and "better even than the Hessians." These troops were incorporated into Howe's army in New York and were part of the Philadelphia campaign. Ansbach-Bayreuth troops were also with General Cornwallis at the Siege of Yorktown, with a force of nearly 1,100 troops.

After the initial mobilization of troops, Ansbach-Beyreuth sent several other transports with new recruits. By the end of the war, 2,361 Soldiers had deployed to the Americas, but fewer than half, 1,041, returned had returned by the end of 1783. The Margrave of Ansbach-Bayreuth was deeply in debt when the war broke out, and received more than £100,000 for the use of his soldiers. In 1791 he sold Ansbach and Bayreuth to Prussia and lived the rest of his life in England on a Prussian pension.

=== Waldeck ===
Waldeck made a treaty to rent troops to Britain on 20 April 1776. Prince Friedrich Karl August of Waldeck kept three regiments ready for paid foreign service. The first of these regiments, with 684 officers and men, sailed from Portsmouth in July 1776 and participated in the New York campaign. During the campaign the Waldeck regiment captured wine and spirits belonging to American General Lee and were embittered towards the British General Howe when he made them empty the bottles by the roadside.

The Waldeck troops were integrated into the German auxiliaries under Hessian General Wilhelm von Knyphausen.

In 1778, the 3rd Waldeck Regiment was sent to defend Pensacola as part of the British force under General John Campbell. The Regiment was dispersed throughout West Florida, including Fort Bute, Mobile and Baton Rouge. The regimental commander, Colonel Johann Ludwig Wilhelm von Hanxleden, complained that his soldiers were sickened and even died due to the climate. The remote locations received few supply ships, and the soldiers' pay was insufficient to buy local goods. Prince August informed Lord Germain that Waldeck could not recruit new soldiers fast enough to replace those dying in West Florida. In addition to slow supplies, the British and Waldeck forces did not receive news in a timely manner. They were unaware that Spain had declared war on Great Britain until they were attacked by forces under Spanish Governor Bernardo de Gálvez. When this campaign was complete at the Siege of Pensacola, Spain recruited many of the poorly fed and supplied Waldeck soldiers. British prisoners of war were later exchanged, but Waldeck prisoners of war were kept by the Spanish in New Orleans, Veracruz, and more than a year in Havana before finally being exchanged in 1782.

Waldeck contributed 1,225 men to the war, and lost 720 as casualties or deserters. In the course of the war, 358 Waldeck soldiers died from sickness, and 37 died from combat.

=== Hanover ===
Five battalions of troops of the Electorate of Brunswick-Lüneburg (Hanover), whose Elector was none other than the British King George III, were sent to Gibraltar and Menorca as early as 1775 to relieve the British soldiers stationed there, who could then be sent to fight in America. Since Hanover was ruled in personal union and had its own government, Hanoverian troops were deployed under a British-Hanoverian Treaty in which Great Britain agreed to pay Hanoverian expenses and defend Hanover against invasion while the troops were away. These Hanoverian soldiers were defenders during the Great Siege of Gibraltar, the largest and longest battle of the war, and in the defense of Menorca. Late in the war, two regiments from Hanover were sent to British India, where they served under British command in the Siege of Cuddalore against a combined French and Mysorean defense.

=== Anhalt-Zerbst ===
The Prince of Anhalt-Zerbst, Frederick Augustus signed a treaty to provide Great Britain with 1,160 men in 1777. The Regiment of two battalions were raised in five months, and consisted of 900 new recruits. One battalion of 600–700 men arrived in the Canadas in May 1778 to guard Quebec City. The other, consisting of some 500 "Pandours" (irregular soldiers recruited from Slavic lands within the Austrian Empire) was sent in 1780 to garrison British-occupied New York City. Whether these troops could function as irregular light infantry has been much debated, although they were described by contemporary accounts as Pandours.

== American and European supporters of Congress ==
=== German Americans ===
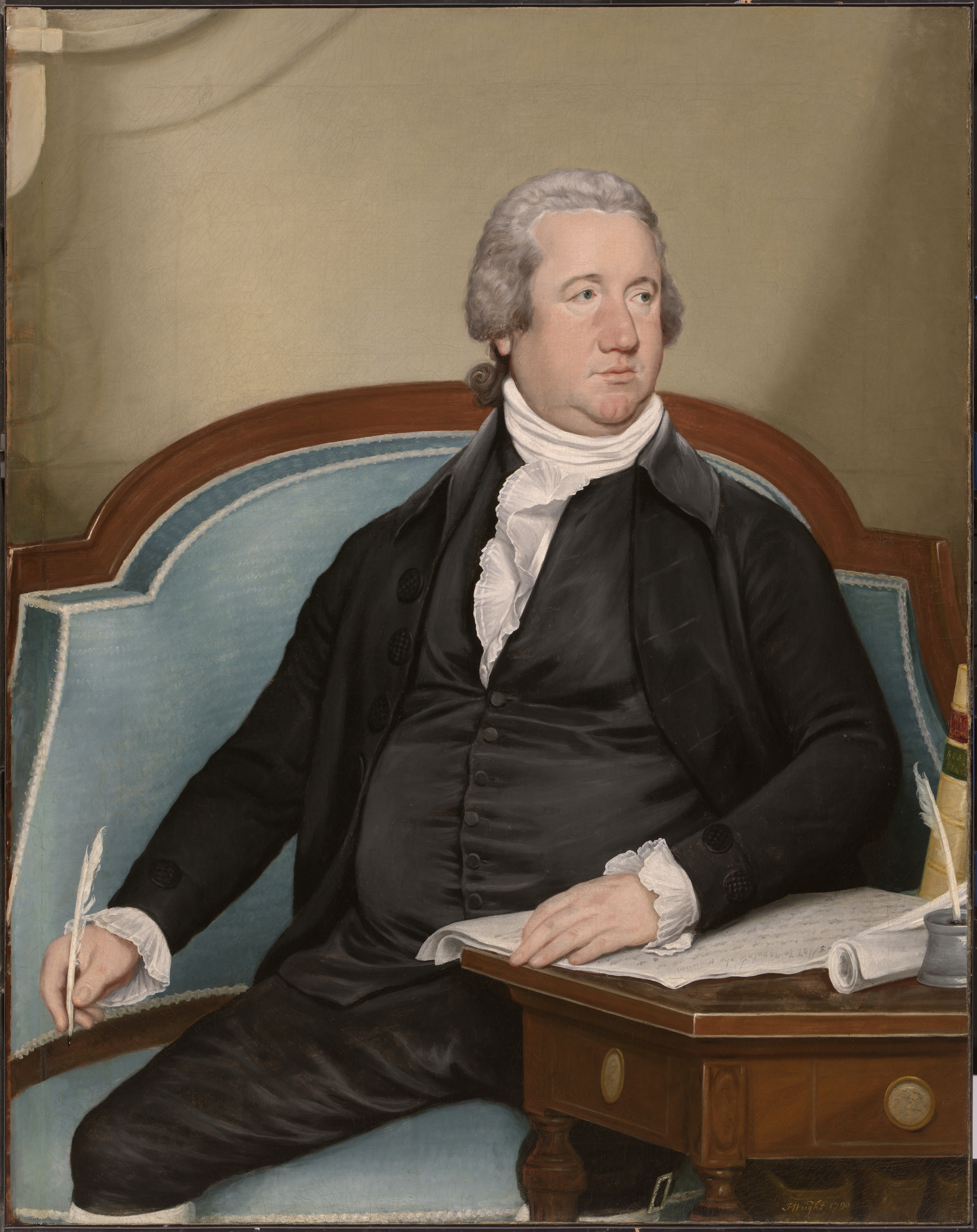
In 1789, following the end of the Revolutionary War, Frederick Muhlenberg, a Lutheran minister and German leader in the Province of Pennsylvania, became the first Speaker of the House of Representatives.

German immigration to the British colonies began in the late 17th century. By the mid-18th century, approximately 10% of the colonial American population spoke German. Germans were easily the largest non-British European minority in British North America, but their assimilation and Anglicisation varied greatly.

During the French and Indian War in 1756, Great Britain utilized them by forming the Royal American Regiment, whose enlisted men were principally German colonists. Other Germans immigrated then, including Frederick, Baron de Weissenfels, who settled in New York as a British officer. When the Revolutionary War began, Weissenfels deserted the British forces and served with the Patriots from 1775 onward, rising to lieutenant colonel.

Prior to the Revolutionary War, a significant number of German settlers in the Southern Colonies were Loyalists, and most colonists of German descent in the Thirteen Colonies did not share the same hostile reaction to British policies such as the Intolerable Acts. Although many German colonists chose to remain neutral during the American Revolution, a significant portion became supporters of either the Patriot and Loyalist causes. They fought in both local militias and regular military units, and a small minority returned to Germany in exile after the war.

Several new states formed German regiments, or filled the ranks of local militias with German Americans. German colonists in Charleston, South Carolina, formed a fusilier company in 1775, and some Germans in Georgia enlisted under General Anthony Wayne.

German patriots were most numerous where they stood in contrast to the large, pacifist Quaker population. Brothers Peter and Frederick Muhlenberg, for example, were elected to Congress, and Peter served on Washington's general staff. The German Van Leer Family all enlisted as officers, some under General Anthony Wayne.

==== Pennsylvania Dutch Provost Corps ====
Pennsylvania Dutch were recruited for the American Provost corps under Captain Bartholomew von Heer, (Note: "It is interesting to note that nearly all men recruited into the Provost Corps were Pennsylvania German." -David L. Valuska) a Prussian who had served in a similar unit in Europe before immigrating to Reading, Pennsylvania, prior to the war.

During the Revolutionary War, the Marechaussee Corps were utilized in a variety of ways, including intelligence gathering, route security, enemy prisoner of war operations, and even combat during the Battle of Springfield. The Marechausee also provided security for Washington's headquarters during the Battle of Yorktown, acted as his security detail, and was one of the last units deactivated after the Revolutionary War. The Marechaussee Corps was often not well received by the Continental Army, due in part to their defined duties but also due to the fact that some members of the corps spoke little or no English. Six of the provosts had even been Hessian prisoners of war prior to their recruitment. Because the provost corps completed many of the same functions as the modern U.S. Military Police Corps, it is considered a predecessor of the current United States Military Police Regiment.

==== German Regiment ====
On 25 May 1776, the Second Continental Congress authorized the 8th Maryland Regiment, also known as the German Battalion or German Regiment, to be formed of colonial ethnic Germans as part of the Continental Army. Unlike most continental line units, it drew from multiple states, initially comprising eight companies: four from Maryland and four (later five) from Pennsylvania. Nicholas Haussegger, a major under General Anthony Wayne, was commissioned as the colonel. The regiment saw service at the Battle of Trenton and the Battle of Princeton, and took part in campaigns against American Indians. The regiment was disbanded 1 January 1781.

=== European supporters of Congress ===
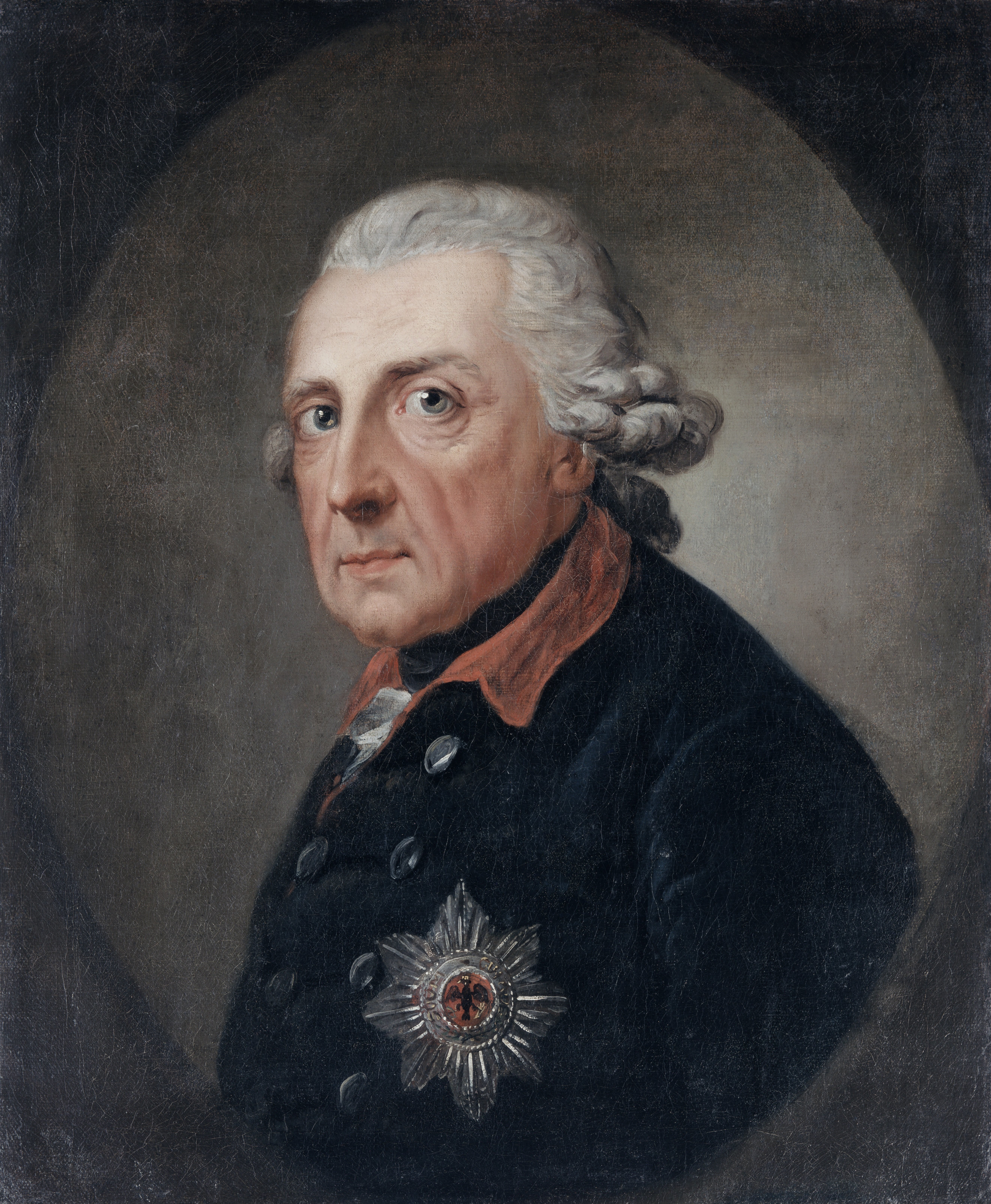
King Frederick the Great of Prussia in 1781

George Washington welcomed Continental European officers in his army. Johann de Kalb was a Bavarian who served in the armies of France before receiving a commission as a general in the Continental Army. Other Germans came to the United States to utilize their military training. Frederick William, Baron de Woedtke, for example, was a Prussian officer who obtained a Congressional commission early in the war; he died in New York in 1776. Gustave Rosenthal was an ethnic German from Estonia who became an officer in the Continental Army. He returned to Estonia after the war, but other German soldiers, such as David Ziegler, chose to stay and become citizens in the nation they had helped found.

In addition, France had eight German-speaking regiments with over 2,500 soldiers. The famous Lauzun's Legion included both French and German soldiers, and was commanded in German. There were also German soldiers and officers in the French Royal Deux-Ponts Regiment.

The most famous German to support the Patriot cause was Friedrich Wilhelm von Steuben from Prussia, who came to America independently, through France, and served as Washington's inspector general. General von Steuben is credited with training the Continental Army at Valley Forge, and he later wrote the first drill manual for the United States Army. In June 1780 he was given command of the advance guard in the defense of Morristown, New Jersey. Von Steuben was granted citizenship and remained in United States until his death in 1794.

Von Steuben's native Prussia joined the League of Armed Neutrality, and Frederick II of Prussia was well appreciated in the United States for his support early in the war. Frederick II maintained a grudge against George III since the British monarch had withdrawn military subsidies during the Seven Years' War. He expressed interest in opening trade with the United States and bypassing English ports, and allowed an American agent to buy arms in Prussia. Frederick predicted American success, and promised to recognize the United States and American diplomats once France did the same. Prussia also interfered in the recruiting efforts of neighboring German states when they raised armies to send to the Americas, and Frederick II forbade enlistment for the American war within Prussia. All Prussian roads were denied to troops from Anhalt-Zerbst, which delayed reinforcements that Howe had hoped to receive during the winter of 1777–1778.

When the War of the Bavarian Succession erupted, however, Frederick II became much more cautious with Prussian relations with Britain. U.S. ships were denied access to Prussian ports, and Frederick refused to officially recognize the United States until they had signed the Treaty of Paris. After the war, Frederick II wrongly predicted that the United States was too large to operate as a republic, and that it would soon rejoin the British Empire with representatives in Parliament.

== Notes and references ==
Notes

== See also ==
- List of British units in the American Revolutionary War

== Bibliography ==
- Atwood, Rodney. The Hessians: Mercenaries from Hessen-Kassel in the American Revolution (Cambridge University Press, 1980).
- Baer, Friederike. Hessians: German Soldiers in the American Revolutionary War (Oxford University Press, 2022). Website
- Baer, Friederike (2015). "The Decision to Hire German Troops in the War of American Independence: Reactions in Britain and North America, 1774–1776". Early American Studies. 13 (1): 111–150. doi:10.1353/eam.2015.0003. JSTOR 24474906. S2CID 143134975.
- Bobrick, Benson (1997). Angel in the Whirlwind. The Triumph of the American Revolution. New York: Simon & Schuster. ISBN 0-684-81060-3.
- Commager, Henry Steele; Richard B. Morris (1958). The Spirit of Seventy-Six. The story of the American Revolution as told by its participants. Castle Books; HarperCollins Publishers. ISBN 0-7858-1463-9. LCCN 67011325.
- Christhilf, Nicholas Dorsey (2018). An Early Philadelphia Musician (PDF). Annapolis.
- Crytzer, Brady J. Hessians: Mercenaries, Rebels, and the War for British North America (Westholme Publishing, 2015).
- Doehla, Johann Conrad (1990). A Hessian Diary of the American Revolution. Translated, Edited, and with an Introduction by Bruce E. Burgoyne from the 1913 Bayreuth edition by W. Baron von Waldenfels. Norman and London: University of Oklahoma Press. ISBN 0-80612254-4. OCLC 722636758.
- Eelking, Max von (1893). The German Allied Troops in the North American War of Independence, 1776–1783. Translated from German by J. G. Rosengarten. Joel Munsell's Sons, Albany, NY. LCCN 72081186.
- Ferling, John (2007). Almost a Miracle. The American Victory in the War of Independence. Oxford University Press, New York. ISBN 978-0-19-518121-0.
- Fetter, Frank Whitson. “Who Were the Foreign Mercenaries of the Declaration of Independence?” Pennsylvania Magazine of History and Biography, vol. 104, no. 4, 1980, pp. 508–513. online
- Frantz, John B., and William Pencak, eds. Beyond Philadelphia: The American Revolution in the Pennsylvania Hinterland (Penn State Press, 2010).
- Hocker, Edward W. The Fighting Parson of the American Revolution: A Biography of General Peter Muhlenberg, Lutheran Clergyman, Military Chieftain, and Political Leader (1936).
- Huck, Stephan (2011). Soldaten gegen Nordamerika. München: Oldenbourg Verlag.
- Ingrao, Charles. "" Barbarous Strangers": Hessian State and Society during the American Revolution." American Historical Review 87.4 (1982): 954-976 online.
- Ingrao, Charles W. The Hessian mercenary state: ideas, institutions, and reform under Frederick II, 1760-1785 Cambridge University Press, 2003.
- Ketchum, Richard M. (1997). Saratoga: Turning Point of America's Revolutionary War. Henry Holt and Company, Inc., New York. ISBN 0-8050-4681-X.
- Jarck, Horst-Rüdiger (ed.)(2000). Brücken in eine neue Welt. Wiesbaden: Harrassowitz.
- Krebs, Daniel (2013). A Generous and Merciful Enemy. Life for German Prisoners of War during the American Revolution. Norman: University of Oklahoma Press. ISBN 978-0-8061-4356-9.
- Lockhart, Paul (2008). The Drillmaster of Valley Forge. The Baron De Steuben and the Making of the American Army. New York: HarperCollins Publishers. ISBN 978-0-06-145163-8.
- Lossing, Benson J (1860). The Pictorial Field-Book of the Revolution. Vol. II. New York: Harper & Brothers.
- Lowell, Edward J (1884). The Hessians and the other German Auxiliaries of Great Britain in the Revolutionary War. Harper & Brothers, Franklin Square, New York. LCCN 02004604.
- Marston, Daniel (2003). The American Revolution, 1774-1783. Taylor & Francis. ISBN 978-0-415-96837-9.
- Neimeyer, Charles Patrick. America Goes to War: A Social History of the Continental Army (1995) complete text online
- Nolt, Steven, Foreigners in Their Own Land: Pennsylvania Germans in the Early American Republic, Penn State U. Press, 2002 ISBN 0-271-02199-3
- Percy, Sarah. Mercenaries: The history of a norm in international relations (Oxford University Press, 2007).
- Reid, Stuart (2010). Frederick the Great's Allies 1756-63. Osprey Publishing Ltd. ISBN 978-1-84908-177-1.
- Roeber, A. G. Palatines, Liberty, and Property: German Lutherans in Colonial British America (1998)
- Rosengarten, Joseph George (1886). The German Soldier in the Wars of the United States. J.B. Lippencott Company, Philadelphia. ISBN 1-4286-5432-1.
- Rosengarten, Joseph George (1906). Frederick the Great and the United States. Harvard University.
- Scales, Jodie K. (2001). Of Kindred Germanic Origins. Writers Club Press.
- Smith, Clifford Neal (1973). Brunswick Deserter-Immigrants of the American Revolution. Heritage House, Thomson, Illinois.
- Stephenson, Michael (2007). Patriot Battles: How the War of Independence was Fought. New York: Harper Collins. ISBN 978-0-06-073261-5.* Stone, William L.; Hund, August (1891). Letters of Brunswick and Hessian Officers during the American Revolution. Albany: Joel Munsell's Sons. ISBN 0-945726-84-8. LCCN 02003420.
- Tappert, Theodore G. "Henry Melchior Muhlenberg and the American Revolution." Church History 11.4 (1942): 284–301. online
- Taylor, Alan (2016). American Revolutions: A Continental History, 1750–1804. W. W. Norton & Company. ISBN 978-0-3932-5387-0.
- Tolzmann, Don Heinrich, ed.; German Americans in the Revolution: Henry Melchoir Muhlenberg Richards' History (2013, based on 1908 history), emphasis on Pennsylvania
- Underwood, Matthew. "Jealousies of a standing army: the use of mercenaries in the American revolution and its implications for Congress's role in regulating private military firms." Northwestern University Law Review106 (2012): 317+. online
- Von Feilitzsch, Heinrich Carl Philipp; Bartholomai, Christian Friedrich (1997). Diaries of Two Ansbach Jaegers. Translated by Burgoyne, Bruce E. Bowie, Maryland: Heritage Books. ISBN 0-7884-0655-8.
- Wolf, Stephanie Grauman (1993). As Various As Their Land: The Everyday Lives of Eighteenth-Century Americans. New York: Harper Collins. ISBN 0-06-016799-8.
