= German Battalion =

Infantry battalion of the Continental Army

- Active: 1776–1781
- Disbanded: January 1781
- Country: United States
- Branch: Continental Army
- Type: Infantry
- Size: Battalion
- Battles: American Revolutionary War; Battle of Trenton; Battle of Assunpink Creek; Battle of Princeton; Battle of Brandywine; Battle of Germantown; Battle of Monmouth; Sullivan Expedition

Commanders
- Notable commanders: Col. Nicholas Haussegger; Col. Henry Leonard d'Arendt

The "German Battalion" (also known as the "German Regiment" or 8th Maryland) was an infantry formation of the Continental Army during the American Revolutionary War. Authorized in May 1776 as an extra Continental regiment, the battalion recruited ethnic Germans from Maryland and Pennsylvania.

The Continental Congress appointed Nicholas Haussegger to command the battalion, which initially organized in the strength of eight companies. While the unit assembled at Philadelphia, a ninth company was added. It fought at Trenton in December 1776, where its men called out in German for the Hessians to lay down their arms.

A week later, the German Battalion was in action at Assunpink Creek where a number of its troops were captured, including Haussegger. The next day, the unit fought at Princeton. After Haussegger defected to the British, George Washington appointed the Prussian volunteer Henry Leonard d'Arendt to command the battalion. The battalion served with the 1st Virginia Brigade at Brandywine and Germantown in September and October 1777. The following June the German Battalion fought at Monmouth. Late in 1778, the unit was assigned to Edward Hand's brigade and served in the Sullivan Expedition in the summer of 1779. The battalion transferred to the New Jersey Brigade before being disbanded in January 1781.

== History ==
=== Formation ===
Unable to field sufficient numbers of soldiers to fight in the American Revolutionary War, the British government hired German auxiliaries from Hesse-Kassel, Brunswick, and four other states in Germany. Patriots were angered by this policy and American propagandists made the most of their opportunity. Prompted by the controversy, the Continental Congress determined to raise a unit from Americans of German descent. What became known as the German Battalion was authorized on 25 May 1776 as an Extra Continental Regiment. Pennsylvania and Maryland each raised four companies from their ethnic German populations. Congress appointed field officers from prominent figures in the German community. Major Nicholas Haussegger of the 4th Pennsylvania Battalion was made colonel in command of the battalion. Captain George Stricker of Maryland was promoted lieutenant colonel and Ludowick Weltner of Maryland was elevated to major. On 17 July the ninth company was recruited from Pennsylvanians at the urging of George Washington as a way to employ French and Indian War veteran Lieutenant John David Woelper of the 3rd Pennsylvania Battalion.

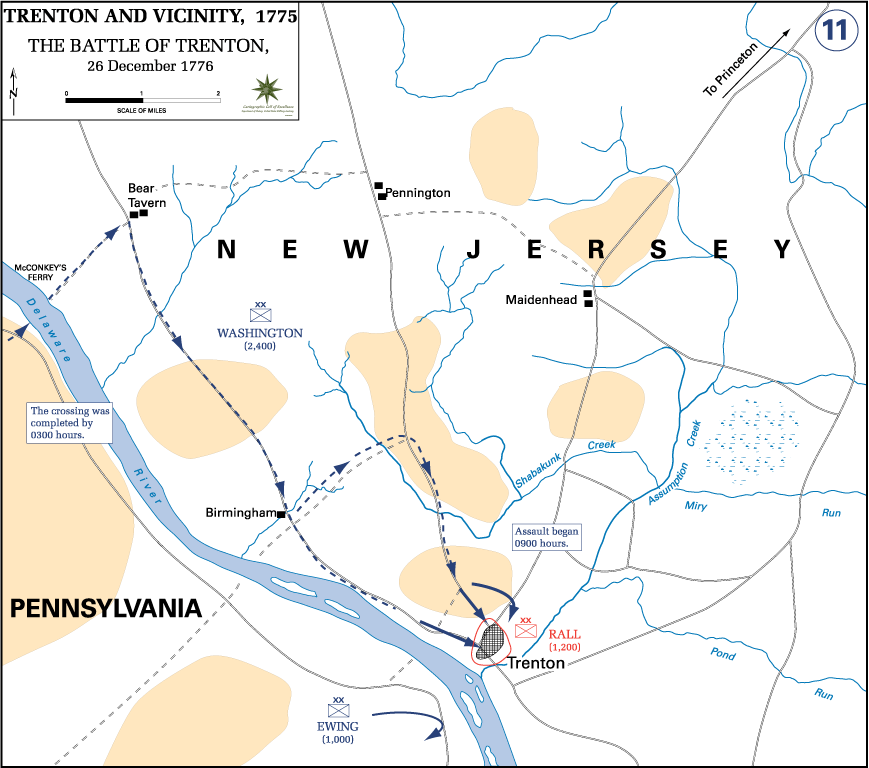
The map shows the Battle of Trenton on 26 December 1776. The German Battalion marched with the eastern column.

The German Battalion was assigned to the Middle Department on 27 June 1776. The unit organized at Philadelphia, Pennsylvania during the period 6 July to 25 September and it was assigned to the main army on 23 September. The five Pennsylvania companies came from the eastern part of the state. Frederick and Baltimore Counties in Maryland each provided two companies. A Bernese Swiss veteran of the French and Indian War who settled in Lebanon, Pennsylvania, Haussegger was promoted on 17 July 1776. Because he was serving in the north, he found out about his promotion in August and did not arrive in Philadelphia until October.

A strength return from 22 December 1776 showed that the battalion mustered 374 soldiers under Haussegger's command. Together with the 254-man 1st Continental Regiment of Edward Hand, the battalion served in Matthias Alexis Roche de Fermoy's brigade. The unit fought in the Battle of Trenton on 26 December. Fermoy's brigade marched with the left column which was accompanied by George Washington. When the column deployed for battle, Hugh Mercer's brigade was on the right, Adam Stephen and Lord Stirling's brigades in the center and Fermoy's brigade on the left. Early in the combat, Washington moved Fermoy's brigade to the east to prevent the Hessian defenders from retreating north to Princeton, New Jersey. When Hessian commander Johann Gottlieb Rall attempted to break out to the north on the east side of town, Washington shifted Fermoy's brigade farther east to outflank Rall. Toward the end of the battle, Haussegger's men yelled in German to the Hessians to lay down their weapons and surrender. With Rall and many of their higher officers wounded, the Hessians soon capitulated.

As New Years Day 1777 dawned, a reinforced American brigade took position behind a creek 6 miles (10 km) south of Princeton, New Jersey, ready to block the advance of Lord Charles Cornwallis' forces. Among the 1,000 Americans were Hand's riflemen, now called the 1st Pennsylvania Regiment, Charles Scott's Virginia Brigade, the German Battalion, and six artillery pieces under Thomas Forrest. During the morning hours, the Americans repulsed the 1st Light Infantry Battalion and two companies of Hessian Jägers. It was necessary to commit British and Hessian grenadiers before the Americans pulled back. The British suffered most of the 140 casualties lost during the action. The German Battalion reported 410 officers and men present for duty that day.

The next day, Cornwallis brought on the Battle of the Assunpink Creek when he launched a major push with 8,000 troops and 28 guns. The alcoholic Fermoy abandoned his troops, leaving the capable Hand in charge. There was a clash at Little Shabbakunk Creek, where Cornwallis was forced to unlimber his artillery. As soon as British pressure became too great, Hand pulled back his men to a second blocking position. Later, they fell back to a third position at Stockton Hollow, outside Trenton. As dusk fell, superior British numbers forced Hand's troops into a hurried retreat through the town. During the withdrawal, the British captured Haussegger and some of his men near the lower fords of Assunpink Creek. Mark M. Boatner III wrote that the unit "disgraced itself". That evening, columns of British and Hessian troops tried to storm the bridge and the lower fords, but were stopped with heavy losses. Washington posted German Battalion at the bridge in the second line, behind Scott's troops. The next day, 3 January, the battalion was present at the Battle of Princeton.

=== Forage War to Valley Forge ===
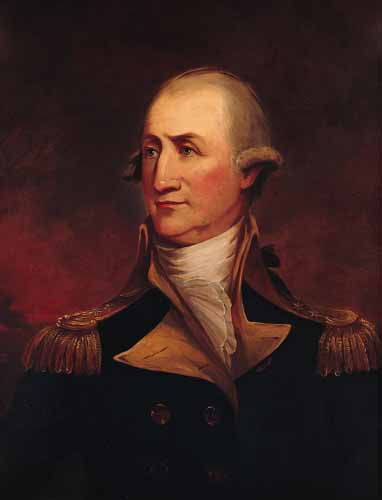
Peter Muhlenberg led the 1st Virginia Brigade.

Many Americans regarded Haussegger's capture with suspicion. He was considered to have defected to the British and was not employed by the American army after being sent home on parole. On 19 March 1777, he was removed from the rolls. Colonel Henry Leonard d'Arendt was appointed to lead the regiment on the same date. Under the command of Lieutenant Colonel Stricker, the battalion fought in the Battle of Spanktown on 23 February 1777 during the Forage War. In the ensuing action, American forces inflicted 75 casualties on the British while losing five killed and nine wounded. By this time, the German Battalion shed its status as an Extra Regiment and was counted as part of two state establishments. One-half of the unit was credited to the Maryland Line while the remaining half became part of the Pennsylvania Line. When Washington began raising Additional Continental Regiments he refrained from raising any in Maryland because of that state's responsibility to the German Battalion.

Weltner became lieutenant colonel on 29 April 1777, replacing Stricker. On 9 April, two additional majors were added as Daniel Burchardt and George Hubley joined William Klein in that rank. On 22 May 1777, Washington assigned the German Battalion to the 2nd Maryland Brigade, then he quickly changed his mind and reassigned it to the 1st Virginia Brigade two days later. The unit would remain in the same brigade until the summer of 1778. Brigadier General Peter Muhlenberg was the commander of the brigade, which also included the 1st, 5th, 9th, and 13th Virginia Regiments. Muhlenberg's 8th Virginia Regiment was also known as the German Regiment.

At the Battle of Brandywine on 11 September 1777, Muhlenberg's brigade formed part of Nathanael Greene's division near Chadds Ford. After Sir William Howe's heavy column reached a position in the American right rear, Washington sent the divisions of John Sullivan, Stephen, and Lord Stirling to block the thrust. After heavy fighting, Howe broke through, threatening to cut off the American retreat. In the crisis, Washington sent Greene's division to the right. George Weedon's brigade marched east, then north to arrive near Dilworth about 6:00 PM. To expedite the move, Muhlenberg's brigade was ordered to take a different route. South of Dilworth, the 2nd Grenadier Battalion ran into Weedon's brigade and other troops and its commander Henry Monckton had to call for assistance. James Agnew's 4th British Brigade came up and one its units, the 64th Foot was roughly handled. Greene's division finally retreated into the night.

Muhlenberg's brigade fought in the Battle of Germantown on 4 October 1777. Together with Weedon's Brigade, it formed Greene's 1,500-man division. Greene commanded the left wing, which included his own division, Stephen's 1,500-strong division, and Alexander McDougall's 1,000-man Connecticut Brigade. Though the other regiments of the brigade are listed, the German Battalion is not mentioned. Stephen's division advanced on the right, Greene's took the center, and McDougall moved up on the left. Part of Muhlenberg's brigade penetrated as far as the Market House. But, caught by converging British units, the 9th Virginia was surrounded and captured. Francis B. Heitman showed the 6th Virginia Regiment in Muhlenberg's brigade at Valley Forge, along with the German Battalion and the previously listed units. Lieutenant Colonel Weltner and Major Burchardt were listed as the field officers.

=== Monmouth to disbandment ===
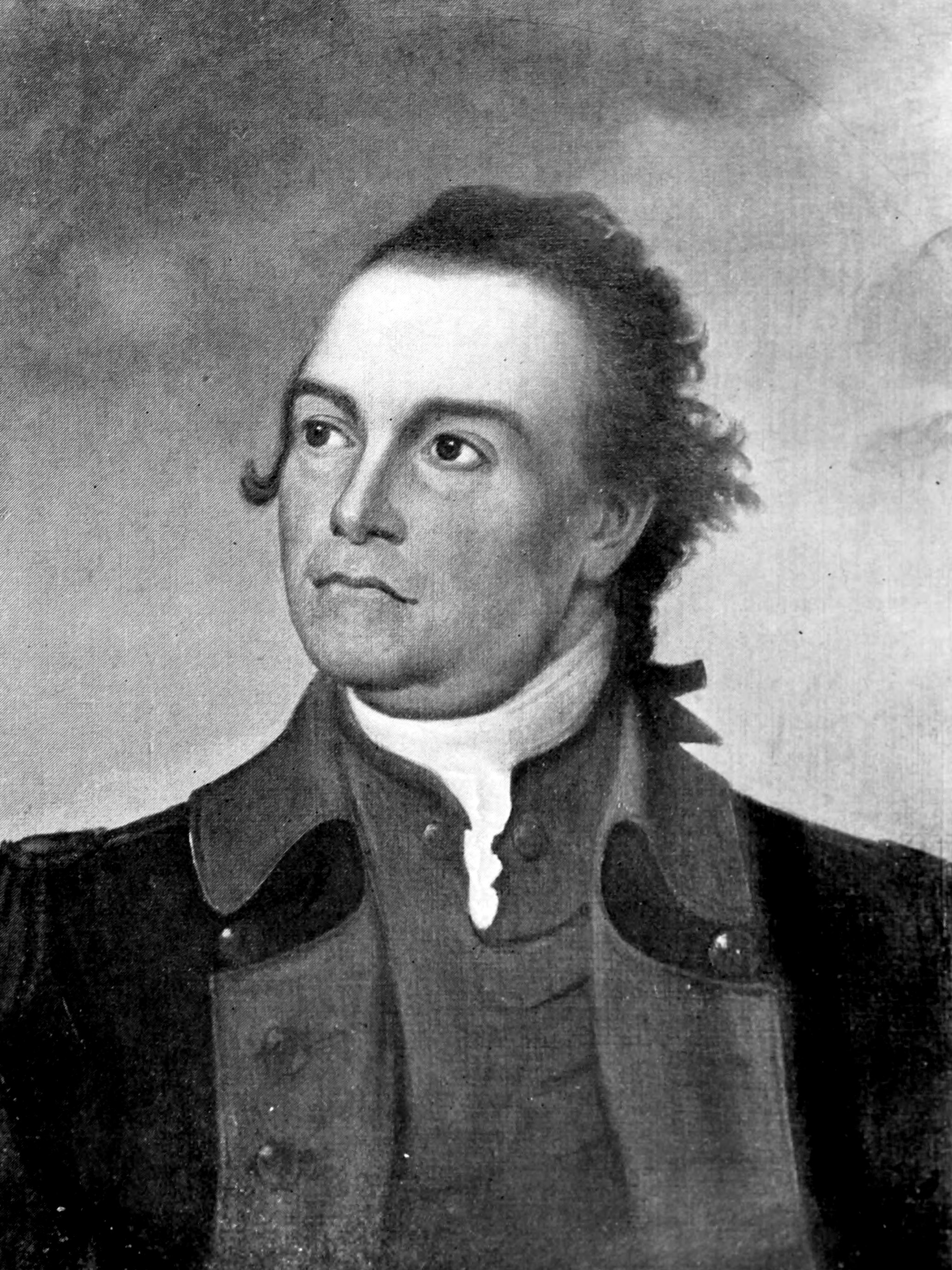
John Sullivan

At the Battle of Monmouth on 28 June 1778, Weltner commanded the German Battalion. By this time, Muhlenberg's Virginia regiments were so shrunken that the 1st, 5th, and 9th Virginia were converged into a single tactical entity. The 1st and 2nd Virginia State Regiments also served in the brigade. The brigade numbered 1026 officers and men, but after detachments only 66 officers and 655 men remained. The others were parceled out to various light infantry detachments in the advance guard. The brigade arrived on the field after 6:00 PM and was not engaged. On 22 July, the battalion transferred to the 2nd Maryland Brigade. The unit was reassigned to Edward Hand's Brigade on 24 November 1778. Klein served as lieutenant colonel from 3 September 1778 until 21 June 1779, though Weltner held the same rank. Hubley's service as major came to an end on 7 February 1779 and Burchardt's tenure ended on 2 July 1779.

The German Battalion participated in the Sullivan Expedition against the Iroquois in 1779. Henry Dearborn's journal listed the "German Regt" under Weltner in Hand's Brigade, together with Lieutenant Colonel Adam Hubley's 11th Pennsylvania Regiment and independent companies led by Captains John Paul Schott and Simon Spaulding. However, Boatner's order of battle for the 2,500-man expedition only listed the 11th and 4th Pennsylvania Regiments in Hand's Brigade. On 8 October 1779, the German Battalion was detached from Hand's Brigade. The unit transferred to the New Jersey Brigade on 16 September 1780. The battalion disbanded at Morristown, New Jersey and Baltimore, Maryland on 1 January 1781. On this date D'Arendt was still colonel and Weltner was still lieutenant colonel.

== Service record ==
Designation	Date	Brigade	Department
German Battalion	25 May 1776	none	none
German Battalion	27 June 1776	none	Middle
German Battalion	23 September 1776	none	Main Army
German Battalion	22 May 1777	2nd Maryland	Main Army
German Battalion	24 May 1777	1st Virginia	Main Army
German Battalion	22 July 1778	2nd Maryland	Main Army
German Battalion	24 November 1778	Hand's	Main Army
German Battalion	8 October 1779	none	Main Army
German Battalion	16 September 1780	New Jersey	Main Army
German Battalion	1 January 1781	New Jersey	disbanded
