= Haussegger =

Haussegger is a German surname. Notable people with the surname include:

- Nicholas Haussegger (1729–1786), American officer investigated for desertion
- Virginia Haussegger (born 1964), Australian journalist

== See also ==
- Siegmund von Hausegger (1872–1948), Austrian composer and conductor
