= Henry Leonard d'Arendt =

Prussian army officer

Henry Leonard Philipe, Baron d'Arendt
- Born: unknown
- Died: unknown
- Allegiance: (Kingdom of Prussia) Prussia; United States
- Branch: Infantry
- Service years: (Kingdom of Prussia) unknown (United States) 1776–1781
- Rank: Colonel (Continental Army)
- Conflicts: Siege of Fort Mifflin (1777)

Henry Leonard Philipe, Baron d'Arendt was a Prussian officer who volunteered to serve in the Continental Army during the American Revolutionary War. He was made colonel of the German Battalion in March 1777 and remained its commander until the unit was disbanded at the beginning of 1781. He was placed in charge during the Siege of Fort Mifflin in October 1777 but did not distinguish himself, committing an act of cowardice in front of an American and a French officer. After this incident, he allowed Samuel Smith and Simeon Thayer to exercise actual command of the besieged fort. D'Arendt was the one who first suggested that George Washington appoint an Inspector General to his staff. This advice proved to be very useful to the American cause when Washington appointed a fellow Prussian, Friedrich Wilhelm von Steuben to that position.

== Regimental commander ==
An officer from the Kingdom of Prussia, D'Arendt arrived in America as a volunteer to fight with the army of George Washington. He was described as "a very military-looking man, six-feet high and elegantly formed". He was appointed colonel of the German Battalion on 19 March 1777. The previous commander, Nicholas Haussegger defected to the British earlier in the year. D'Arendt remained the German Battalion's commander until it was disbanded on 1 January 1781.

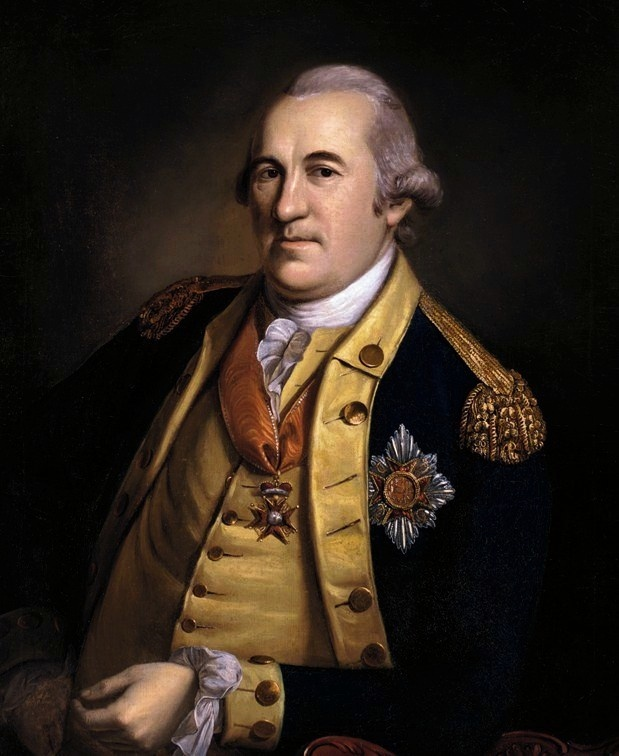
Friedrich von Steuben proved to be an excellent choice for Inspector General, a staff position suggested by d'Arendt.

On 23 September 1777, George Washington ordered d'Arendt to assume command of Fort Mifflin. However, he did not come to the fort for four weeks due to illness. Evidently, the Prussian was confused because there were two men named Greene under his authority. On 20 October, Washington tried to straighten out the problem in a letter.

Sir: I am just now favoured with yours of this date, and am sorry that you laboured under any mistake on account of there being two Officers of the name of Green. Colo. Christopher Greene of Rhode Island is to command at Red Bank, and Lt. Colo. John Greene of Virginia is to go into Fort Mifflin with the detachment under his command. I have no Blank Commissions with me and am therefore obliged to send you a certificate of your Rank and date of your Appointment. I beg you will make the greatest haste to throw yourself into Fort Mifflin; in the defence of which I wish you the greatest success. I am etc.

When d'Arendt finally arrived on 21 October, he was taken on a tour of inspection by Lieutenant Colonel Samuel Smith and Major François-Louis Teissèdre de Fleury. When they reached the damaged northwest blockhouse, the Prussian asked what had happened. They told him that it was often a target of British fire and that a store of ammunition had been blown up the day before. To their amazement and disgust, d'Arendt leapt through two windows in his haste to flee the blockhouse. Fleury turned to Smith and exclaimed, "Par Dieu! C'est un poltroon!" (By God, he's a coward.) Smith responded that they should scare the Prussian away from the fort before he caused problems. Smith soon applied to Washington to be relieved of his post. The American commander-in-chief diplomatically reminded Smith that d'Arendt was in charge and told him he could do as he wished, but that he hoped that he would make the right choice. Smith stayed. D'Arendt was still unwell, so Smith continued to exercise control over the garrison and its operations during the Siege of Fort Mifflin. When Smith was wounded, it was Major Simeon Thayer who took command of the fort, not d'Arendt.

== A wise recommendation ==
D'Arendt was the officer who recommended to Washington that an Inspector General be included on his staff. A council of war agreed with this idea. It was seen as a way to better utilize the military knowledge of foreign officers. In December 1777, the Continental Congress formalized the rank and appointed Thomas Conway to the office. The inspectors, whose duties were to teach the soldiers how to maneuver according to the best European standards, were ordered to report directly to Congress. Conway soon proved a poor choice because he became embroiled in the Conway Cabal and a dispute over rank. He sent his resignation to Congress and it was accepted on 28 April 1778, much to Conway's surprise. Meanwhile, Washington appointed Friedrich Wilhelm von Steuben as a temporary inspector general on 28 March 1778. Steuben proved a happy choice and Washington strenuously pressed for his promotion to Major General, which Congress approved on 5 May 1778.

When the German Battalion fought at the Battle of Monmouth on 28 June 1778, evidently d'Arendt was not present because its acting commander was Lieutenant Colonel Ludowick Weltner. D'Arendt applied for a year of medical leave on 18 August 1778 and never returned to his regiment.
