= Nicholas Haussegger =

Swiss mercenary

- Born: 1729; Bern, Switzerland
- Died: July 1786 (aged 56–57) unknown
- Military career
- Allegiance: Dutch Republic; Kingdom of Great Britain; United States
- Branch: Infantry
- Service years: ?–1756 (Dutch); 1756–1764 (Great Britain); 1776–1777 (U.S.); 1777–? (Great Britain)
- Rank: Colonel (Continental Army)
- Conflicts: Forbes Expedition (1758); Bouquet Expedition (1764); Battle of Trenton (1776); Battle of Assunpink Creek (1777)

Nicholas Haussegger (1729 – July 1786) was a Swiss mercenary who arrived in the British Colonies in North America about 1756 as a subaltern officer in the British army during the French and Indian War. After the war he purchased a farm in Lebanon county and became a leader in the local Pennsylvania German community. At the beginning of the American Revolutionary War Haussegger joined the 4th Pennsylvania Battalion as a field officer. He was placed in command of the German Battalion, a unit of ethnic Germans from Pennsylvania and Maryland, on July 17, 1776. He led his battalion at Trenton in late December 1776. A week later, he was taken prisoner at Assunpink Creek and investigated over allegations of desertion and attempting to persuade American prisoners-of-war to join the British army. Evidence credible enough to bring him to trial apparently never materialized, but he felt "neglected and injuriously treated" by the incident and eventually resigned his commission in 1781. He is believed to have died at his farm in Pennsylvania in 1786, however there were also contemporaneous claims made that he went to Canada with his wife.

== French and Indian War ==
Haussegger was born in 1729 in Bern, Switzerland. By 1756 he was a sergeant in the Struler Swiss Regiment, which was in the pay of the Dutch Republic. That year Jacques Marcus Prevost enlisted him and 48 others in the newly formed British 60th Foot, the Royal Americans. During the French and Indian War, he was in action during the Forbes Expedition in 1758 and received promotion to lieutenant. When Pontiac's War broke out, he marched with Henry Bouquet's column to recover Indian captives in 1764.

After the war, Haussegger settled down in Lebanon, Pennsylvania to raise his family. A homeowner and tavern keeper, he participated in the community, becoming a member of the fire association and a constable. He married Cathrin Elizabeth Guth on 10 Jun 1758, and the couple had three daughters, Catherina (b. 1760), Elizabeth, and Sara who was born on 2 November 1761 in Heidelberg, Lebanon County Pennsylvania and died on 19 October 1826 in Jonestown, Lebanon County, Pennsylvania. Sara was married to Daniel Weidel on April 12, 1779 in Lebanon County Pennsylvania, and together they had 11 children.

== American Revolutionary War ==
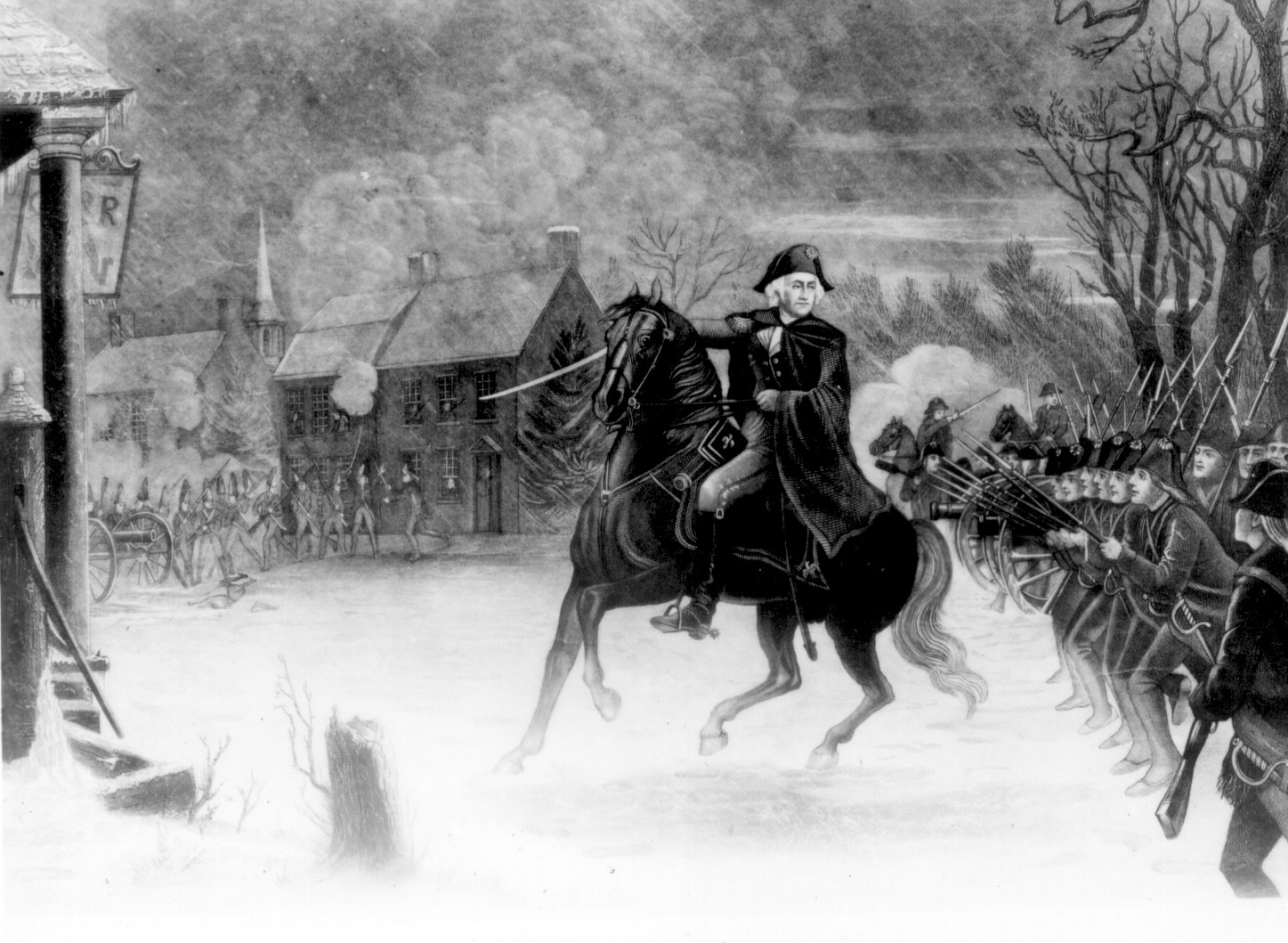
Haussegger led the German Battalion capably at the Battle of Trenton. Washington directs his troops.

At the outbreak of the American Revolutionary War one of his neighbors, John Philip De Haas became commander of the 1st Pennsylvania Battalion. Haussegger joined the Continental Army and became a major in the 4th Pennsylvania Battalion on 4 January 1776. Meanwhile, on 25 May the Continental Congress began recruiting the German Battalion from ethnic Germans in Pennsylvania and Maryland. Later, Haussegger was appointed colonel in command while Marylanders George Stricker and Ludowick Weltner became lieutenant colonel and major, respectively. His commission dated from 17 July 1776. However, he only found out about his appointment in August while campaigning in the north and did not assume command of his battalion until October.

The German Battalion assembled at Philadelphia, Pennsylvania between 6 July and 25 September 1776. The unit was made up of five companies from eastern Pennsylvania and two companies each from Frederick and Baltimore Counties in Maryland. On 23 September the battalion was assigned to George Washington's main army.

Haussegger led his 374-man battalion at the Battle of Trenton on 26 December 1776 where his men served in Matthias Alexis Roche de Fermoy's brigade. The other unit in the brigade was the 1st Continental Regiment under Edward Hand. During the engagement, George Washington deployed the brigade to the east to keep the Hessians from escaping to Princeton, New Jersey. When Hessian commander Johann Rall attempted to break out to the north, Fermoy's brigade quickly shifted farther east to block the thrust. Near the end of the fight, Haussegger's men called out to the Hessians in German to lay down their weapons and surrender. Soon afterward the Hessians did so.

On 31 December 1776, Washington learned that a British force under Lord Charles Cornwallis was assembling in Princeton, New Jersey. The American army commander sent 1,000 men and six guns to delay their approach. Charles Scott's Virginians, Hand's Pennsylvanians, Haussegger's Germans, and Thomas Forrest's artillerists took a position behind Shipetaukin Creek, then called Eight Mile Run. When the British 1st Light Infantry Battalion and two companies of Hessian Jägers appeared at dawn on 1 January 1777, the defenders opened fire. The light infantry were repulsed until Hessian and British grenadier battalions were committed to the struggle, whereupon the Americans pulled back. A Hessian eyewitness, Johann von Ewald reported that both armies together lost 140 casualties and that the British side lost the greater number. Ewald admitted that his own company lost seven men. On New Year's Day, the German Battalion's muster roll reported 410 men present for duty.

On 2 January, the Battle of the Assunpink Creek began in earnest. Soon after Cornwallis' column resumed its advance, an American rifleman shot a British cavalryman dead and near Lawrenceville (then called Maidenhead), a mounted Hessian jäger suffered the same fate. The Americans deployed in woods behind Little Shabbakunk Creek, then known as Five Mile Run. At this point Fermoy, an alcoholic, galloped away to Trenton, leaving his troops to fend for themselves. Hand assumed command of the force and neatly ambushed the British vanguard, forcing Cornwallis to deploy his column and pound the woods with his guns. An attempt to turn Hand's right flank was blocked when a large force of Americans appeared along Assunpink Creek to the east. When the British advanced they found that Hand's men slipped back to another position at Stockton Hollow. Hand's riflemen took position on the left, Scott's men on the right, and Forrest's guns in the center. The position of the German Battalion was not given. Just before 5:00 PM, heavy pressure forced Hand to order a retreat. As the Americans fell back through Trenton to the lower fords and the bridge across Assunpink Creek, the retreat became disorderly. The bulk of the troops successfully withdrew behind the creek where they subsequently repelled several British and Hessian attacks with heavy losses.

During the retreat, Haussegger was captured along with a number of his soldiers near the lower fords. According to a second account, on 1 January he insisted on marching his battalion into Princeton. Major Weltner argued strongly against this, and when the colonel and 10 men continued into the town, they were made prisoners. While he was in New York City, other prisoners including Ethan Allen and Alexander Graydon reported that Haussegger told them that the American cause was finished. He suggested to the others that they ought to ask forgiveness and make peace with the British. Haussegger bragged that he dined with Hessian General Leopold Philip von Heister.

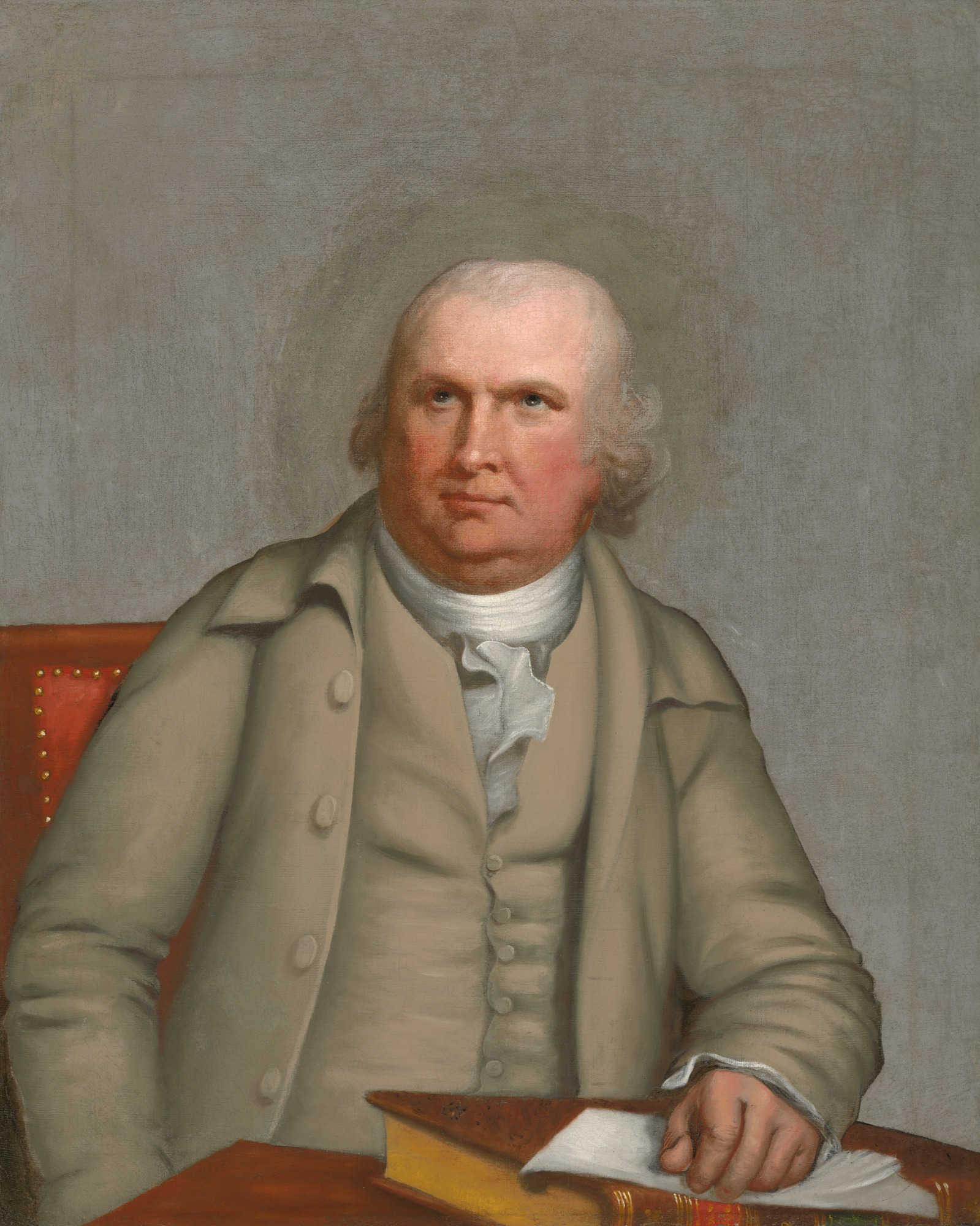
Robert Morris, whom Haussegger convinced he was a Patriot

After being paroled by the British, Haussegger was able to convince Robert Morris that he was a Patriot. Nevertheless, Washington gave instructions to his parole commissioner John Beatty that Haussegger was not to be exchanged because of the suspicious manner in which he was captured.

== Post-Capture and Death ==
Haussegger retired to his home in Lancaster County, Pennsylvania where Washington had him watched. On 19 March 1777 he was struck from the army rolls for "having joined the enemy". In 1778 his township marked him as a "Tory" and denied him a tavern license. British Major John André was in contact with him in 1779 and he may also have communicated with Joseph Brant. On 1 Feb 1781, Haussegger wrote a letter to General Washington resigning his commission, as follows:

"Sir,

The principles of the present Contest have been so totally changed, from what they were, when I first accepted a Commission under your command, and myself so much neglected and injuriously treated by those in whose service I was, that I cannot consistent with the honest Man, and in justice to myself hold it any longer.

I have therefore taken the Liberty to enclose my Colonels Commission (my Major’s Commission being long since lost), with this my final Resignation thereof, which your Excellency will make acceptable to Congress. And am with respect, Your Excellency’s, most obedt humble Servt

Nicks Haussegger

Other evidence indicated that he may have assisted William Rankin, a loyalist and spy. Historian Mark M. Boatner III asserted that he was a "turncoat", however there are others who have tried to disprove this. In either case, Haussegger was declared a traitor after resigning, and his property was sold in January 1782. The following year he begged for help from Frederick Haldimand the British governor of Quebec. He died in July 1786 and his wife petitioned the British government to be paid for her deceased husband's services to the crown. His sons-in-law Daniel Weidel and Nicholas Krehl, who both served honorably in the war, petitioned the General Assembly in 1787, requesting bounty land for their service and citing the loss of the land of their ancestors through the Haussegger treason.

== Other reading ==
- Davis, James F (1989). A Man of No Country: The Case of Nicholas Haussegger (1729-1786). Lebanon County Historical Society.
