= Frederick William, Baron de Woedtke =

Continental Army brigadier general

- Born: 1740
- Died: 1776 (aged 35–36); Fort George, New York, U.S.
- Burial place: Fort George, New York (unmarked)

Friedrich Wilhelm, Baron de Woedtke (c. 1740 – July 28, 1776) was a Prussian officer who served in the Continental Army during the American War of Independence.

== Early life ==
Woedtke was the son of Georg Eggert, a colonel in the Prussian Army. His brother Leopold Christian also served in the Prussian army, and attained the rank of captain in the 4th Regiment of Dragons.

Woedtke joined the Prussian Army's 3rd regiment of Cuirassiers in 1758 and served in the Seven Years' War. In 1762 he was promoted to major. According to contemporaries, Woedtke developed a cynical streak and insubordinate attitude as the result of his Seven Years' War experience. As a result, he began to mock the king and leader of the army, Frederick the Great, and nicknamed him "Grave Digger", which was later shortened to "Digger".

While traveling in Poland in 1771, Woedtke married a German merchant's daughter without first obtaining the king's permission. He requested permission after the fact, but the king, apparently aware of Woedtke's insubordination, charged him with desertion. Woedtke was arrested, but eventually fled to Switzerland. He then made his way to France, where he became a captain and inspector of cavalry in the French Army. While in Paris, Woedtke met Benjamin Franklin and offered his services to the American cause. Franklin dispatched Woedtke to the Continental Congress with a letter of recommendation indicating he was a successful Prussian officer who would assist the American cause.

== American Revolution ==
Woedtke came to the new United States in 1776, after the beginning of the American Revolution. Based on Franklin's recommendation, John Adams nominated him for appointment as a brigadier general, and Congress granted him a commission on March 16, 1776, assigning him to the army under General Philip Schuyler in New York.

En route to carry out his new commission in April 1776, Woedtke accompanied Benjamin Franklin, who was on a diplomatic mission to Canada. Charles Carroll, a congressman from Maryland on the same mission, wrote that Woedtke was "not the best bred up by his Prussian Majesty", a likely reference to Woedtke's alcoholism. Adams later wrote below Woedtke's signature on a letter Woedtke sent to Washington "Good for nothing."

Woedtke ceased traveling with the diplomatic mission after reporting to General Philip Schuyler. The two generals joined Brigadier General John Thomas and set out to reinforce General Benedict Arnold during Arnold's siege of Quebec.

After the failure of the Canadian campaign, Woedtke returned to New York. He was with the general council (which included Schuyler and Horatio Gates) that decided to abandon Fort Crown Point and consolidate at Mount Independence on the Vermont side of Lake Champlain.

== Death and burial ==
Woedtke became ill in July 1776, possibly of smallpox, possibly from alcoholism. Benjamin Rush wrote that Woedtke died from "the effects of hard drinking." According to the letters of Horatio Gates and others who were with him, Woedtke died at the Fort George military post near Lake George in late July 1776, shortly after the meeting of the general council. The Continental Congress used July 28 as the date his commission was terminated as the result of his death. He was buried in an unmarked grave near Fort George.
