= Historic Rock Ford =

Historic house in Pennsylvania, United States

- Gen. Edward Hand House
- U.S. National Register of Historic Places
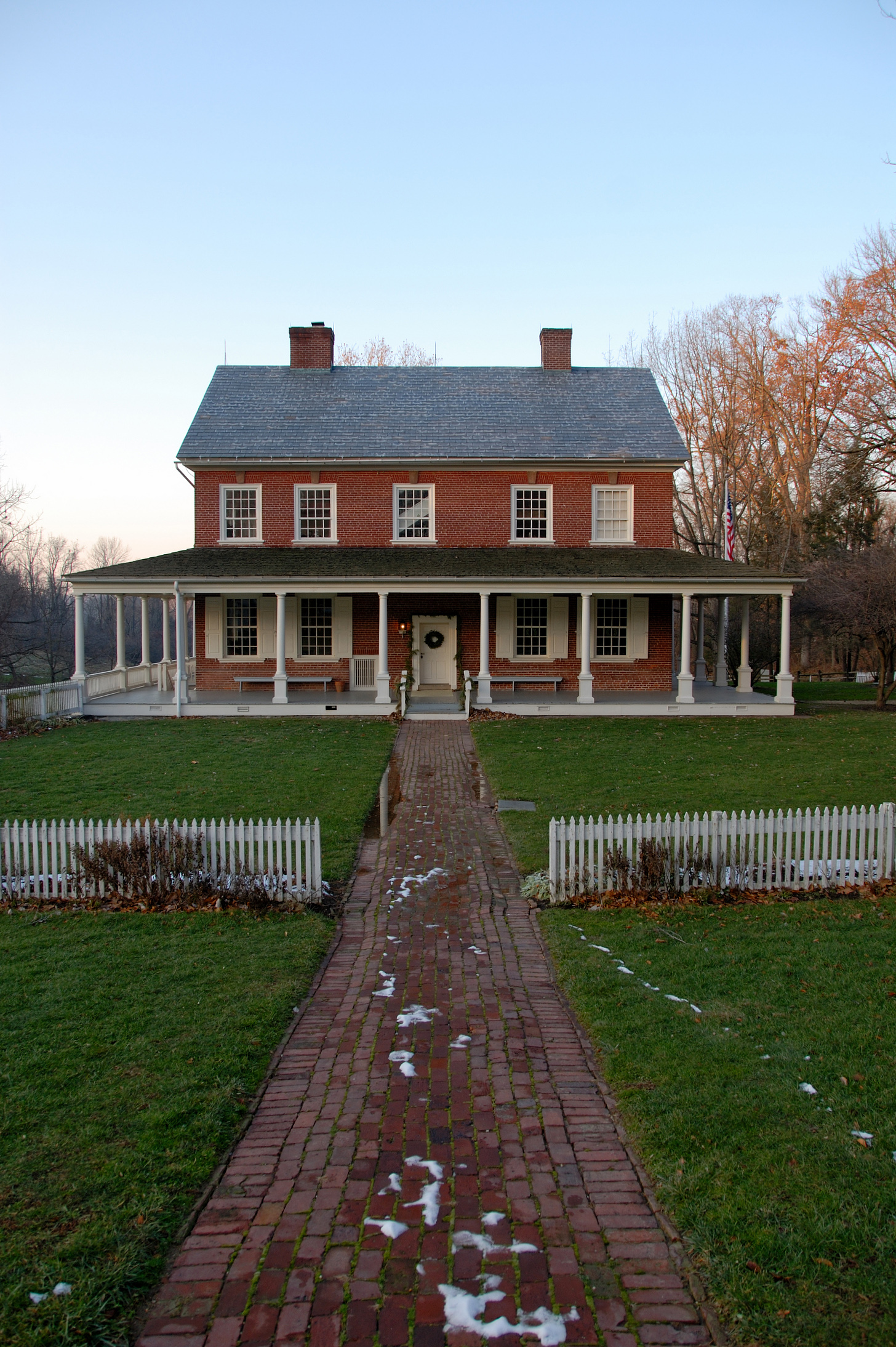

- Location within Pennsylvania
- Location: 881 Rock Ford Road, Lancaster, Pennsylvania
- Coordinates: 40°1′12″N 76°17′17″W
- Built: 1793
- Architectural style: Georgian
- NRHP reference No.: 76001646
- Added to NRHP: November 21, 1976

Historic Rock Ford, comprising the General Edward Hand Mansion and the John J. Snyder, Jr. Gallery of Early Lancaster County Decorative Arts, is located in southeastern Lancaster, Pennsylvania. Although the property is surrounded by Lancaster County Central Park, it is privately owned and operated by the Rock Ford Foundation, a 501(c)(3) not-for-profit organization.

Owned by Edward Hand, an adjutant general to George Washington during the American Revolutionary War, this house was listed on the National Register of Historic Places on November 21, 1976.

== History ==
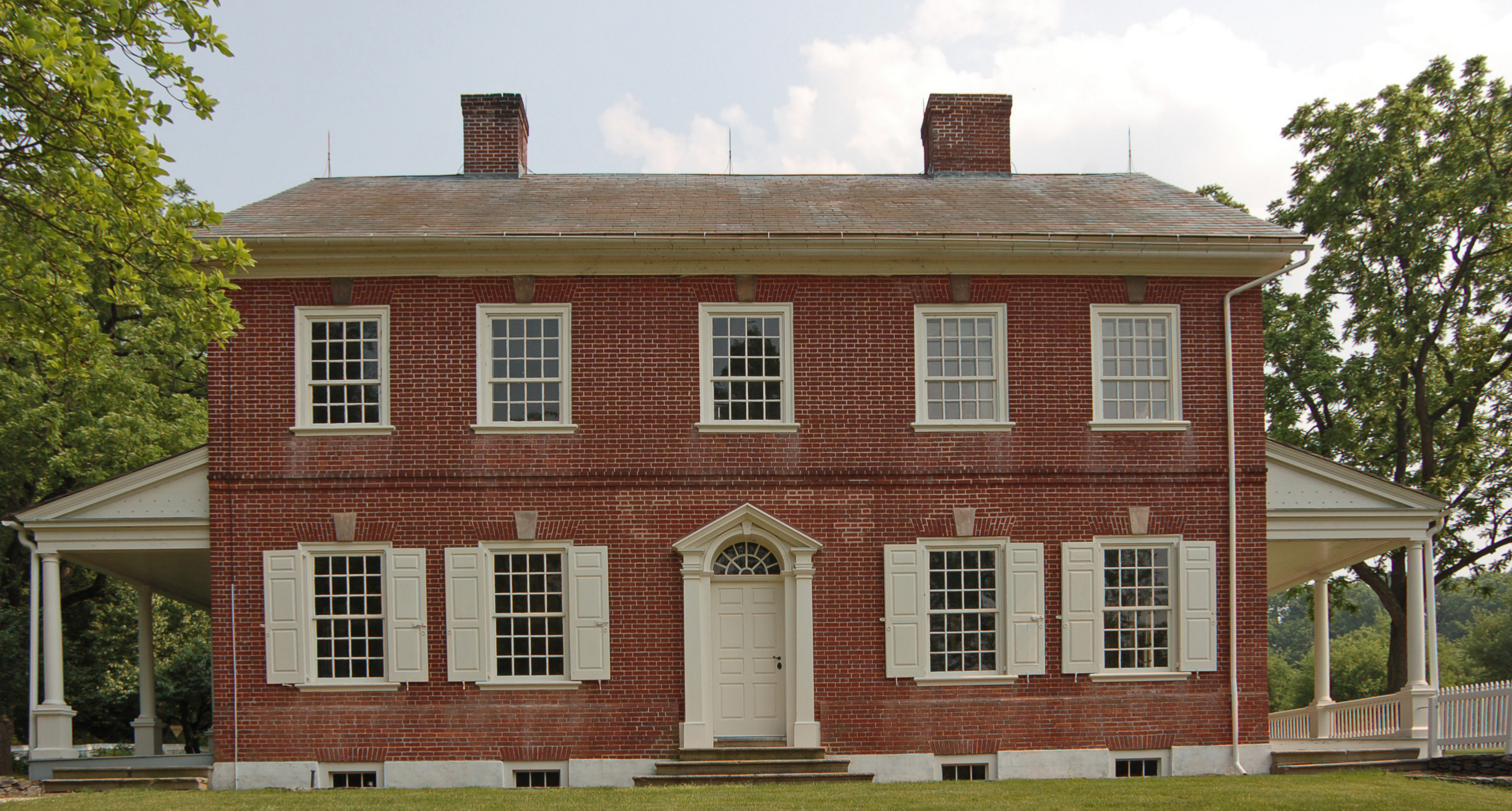
Front (north) view

Irish-American soldier Edward Hand bought the land on which the plantation was built in two transactions, first purchasing 160 acres (65 ha) in 1785 and later buying an additional 17 acres (6.9 ha) in 1792. In late eighteenth-century Pennsylvania, the word “plantation” was a term for land under cultivation, which was essentially synonymous with the term "farm," and had not yet developed the close association with chattel slavery that it has acquired in modern parlance. Nevertheless, slavery was legal in all of the thirteen original states and existed in Lancaster County, Pennsylvania during the time of the Hand family's residence at Rock Ford. Hand was also an enslaver of several people, one of whom, Frank, escaped in 1802.

The Georgian-style brick mansion was built in 1794, and its architecture has since remained largely unchanged. All four floors conform to the same plan, a center hall and four corner rooms, as was typical of the period. Historic Rock Ford stands on the banks of the Conestoga River, 1 mile (1.6 km) southeast of the center of Lancaster. General Edward Hand and his wife Katherine Hand lived at Rock Ford with their seven children from 1794 until his death in 1802, and then her death in 1805.

After being sold from the Hand Estate in 1810, the property was operated as a tenant farm into the mid-twentieth century. The tenant farmers who lived here for roughly one hundred and fifty years made almost no changes to the house.

== Museum ==
Historic Rock Ford is widely considered to be one of the most important examples of Georgian domestic architecture surviving in Pennsylvania and the most intact building predating 1800 in Lancaster County. The mansion's elegant rooms are furnished with an outstanding collection of period furnishings and decorative arts. The mansion is listed on the National Register of Historic Places, and also is recorded in the Historic American Buildings Survey.

Rock Ford was saved from destruction by the Junior League in 1958; the house was renovated and restored to become an historic house museum. The Rock Ford Foundation (501(c)(3)) was established as a nonprofit to operate the museum.

Today, visitors may come to Historic Rock Ford for guided tours to learn what it was like to live on the property between 1794 and 1805. The house is set up to reflect the inventory of the house when Hand died in 1802.

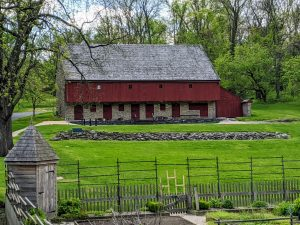
The John J. Snyder Jr. Gallery is housed on the second floor of the bank barn

The John J. Snyder Jr. Gallery is housed on the second floor of the eighteenth-century bank barn, and is accessible via a modern welcome center addition. Located on the site of Rock Ford's original barn, it was renovated to showcase an exceptional collection of Lancaster County decorative arts including tall case clocks, furniture, silver, ceramics, and paintings which were gifted to the foundation by the renowned scholar John J. Snyder Jr.

Visitors may also view the Kauffman collection of Lancaster County Pennsylvania Long Rifles, which are also on display. The gallery exhibits decorative arts from the eras of the Revolutionary War and the Early American Republic, circa 1760 to 1820, a period roughly congruent with the Hand family's residence in Lancaster.

== See also ==
- National Register of Historic Places listings in Lancaster, Pennsylvania
- Edward Hand
