= Edward Hand =

Irish-born American army officer and politician

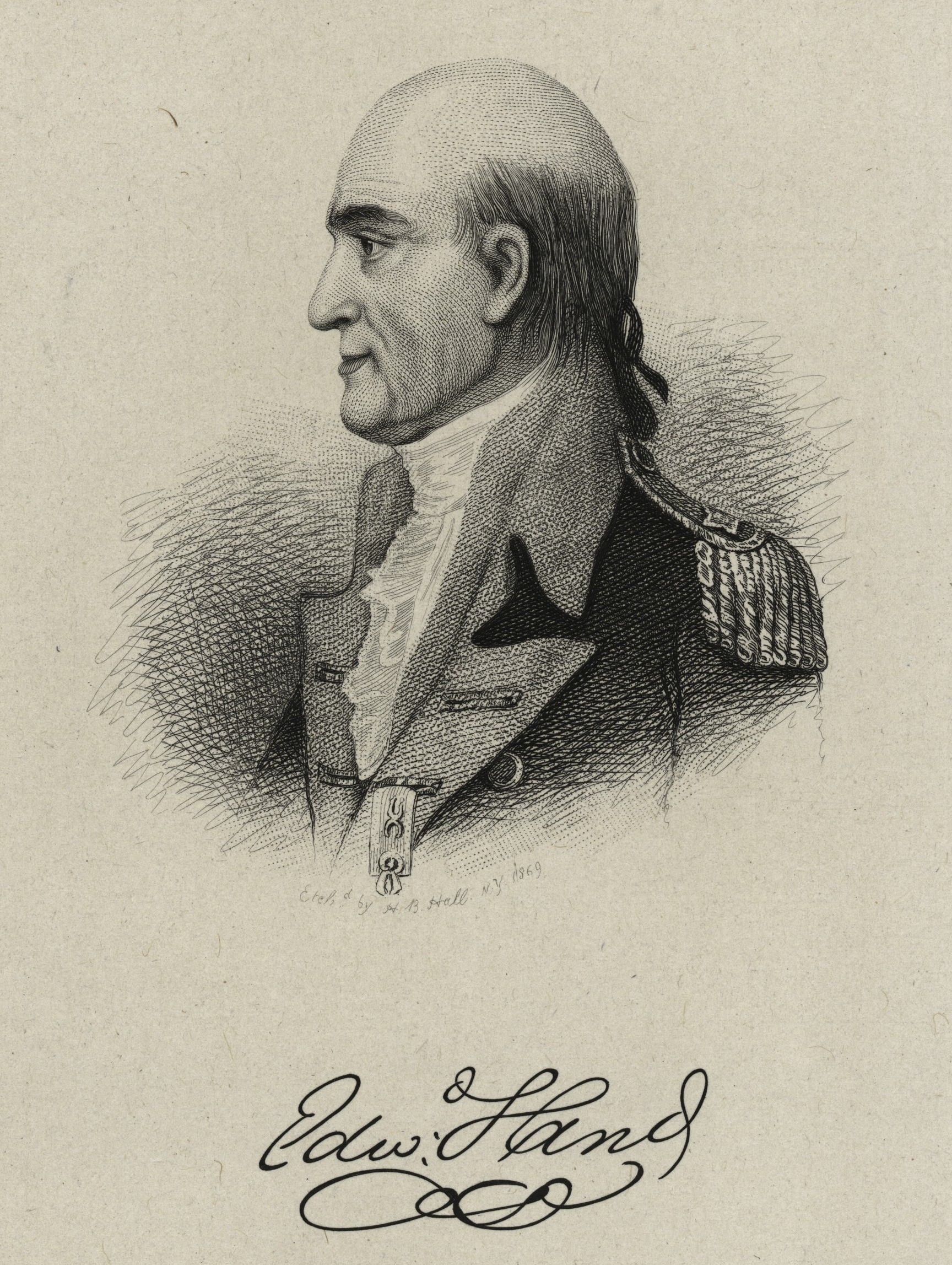
- Portrait of Hand
- Born: 31 December 1744; Clyduff, King's County, Ireland
- Died: 3 September 1802 (aged 57); Rock Ford, Lancaster, Pennsylvania, U.S.
- Burial place: St. James's Episcopal Cemetery; Lancaster, Pennsylvania
- Education: Trinity College Dublin
- Spouse: Katherine Hand (née Ewing) (m. 1775)
- Children: 8
- Relatives: Jasper Yeates, Uncle-in-law
- Military career
- Allegiance: Great Britain; United States
- Service/branch: British Army; Continental Army
- Rank: Major General
- Units: Royal Irish Regiment
- Commands: 1st Pennsylvania Regiment
- Conflicts: American Revolutionary War; Battle of Long Island; Sullivan Expedition; Siege of Yorktown
- Awards: Order of the Cincinnati
- Other work: Farmer and politician

Edward Hand (December 31, 1744 – September 3, 1802) was an Irish-born American army officer and politician who served in the Continental Army during the American Revolutionary War. Rising to the rank of major general, Hand served as Adjutant General of the Continental Army under George Washington. After the war, Hand retired to farm his estate, Rock Ford, and served in the Pennsylvania General Assembly and Lancaster city government.

== Early life and career ==
Hand was born in Clyduff, King's County (now County Offaly), Kingdom of Ireland, on 31 December 1744, and was baptised in Shinrone. His father was John Hand.

=== Education and British military service ===
Hand earned a medical certificate from Trinity College, Dublin. In 1767, Hand enlisted as a Surgeon's mate in the 18th (Royal Irish) Regiment of Foot. On May 20, 1767, he sailed with the regiment from Cobh, Cork, Ireland, arriving at Philadelphia on July 11. While serving in Pennsylvania, he befriended Colonel George Washington, becoming lifelong friends with the future President.

In 1772, he was commissioned an ensign. He marched with the regiment to Fort Pitt, on the forks of the Ohio River. While stationed at Fort Pitt, Hand thrived as a merchant along the Ohio River, making lucrative land deals. Hand returned to Philadelphia in 1774, where he resigned and sold his commission for £400.

==== Arrival in Lancaster ====
In 1774, Hand moved to Lancaster, Pennsylvania, where he practiced medicine. On March 13, 1775, he married Katherine Ewing (born March 25, 1751 in Philadelphia, Pennsylvania). Katherine was the niece of Jasper Yeates, a prominent Lancaster attorney and later justice of the Supreme Court of Pennsylvania, who became Hand's political mentor.

Establishing himself in the community, Hand was active in forming the Lancaster County Associators, a colonial militia. After arriving in Lancaster, Hand joined one the growing Freemasonry lodges in the frontiertown.

== American Revolution ==
Hand entered the Continental Army in 1775 as a lieutenant colonel in the 1st Pennsylvania Regiment under Colonel William Thompson. He was promoted to colonel in 1776 and placed in command of the 1st Continental (then designated the 1st Pennsylvania). Hand was a key figure in the New Jersey leg of the New York and New Jersey campaign in January 1777, particularly the Battle of the Assunpink Creek, where skirmishing by Hand's riflemen slowed the attack of the British and played a part in Continental victory.

Promoted to brigadier general in March 1777, he served as the commander of Fort Pitt, fighting British loyalists and their Indian allies. In early 1778, Hand led an expedition into the Ohio country to capture a small British magazine on the Cuyahoga River near Lake Erie, which could be used to supply Native American nations who had allied with the British, such as the Wyandot and the Shawnee. However, failing to distinguish among Native American groups, the unruly militiamen under Hand's command attacked the neutral Lenape village of Kuskusky, killing the mother, brother, and a child of Chief Hopocan, known as Captain Pipe. The expedition became derisively known as the Squaw Campaign. Hand was later recalled after serving over a year at Fort Pitt (June 1777 to August 1778), to command a brigade in Major General La Fayette's division.

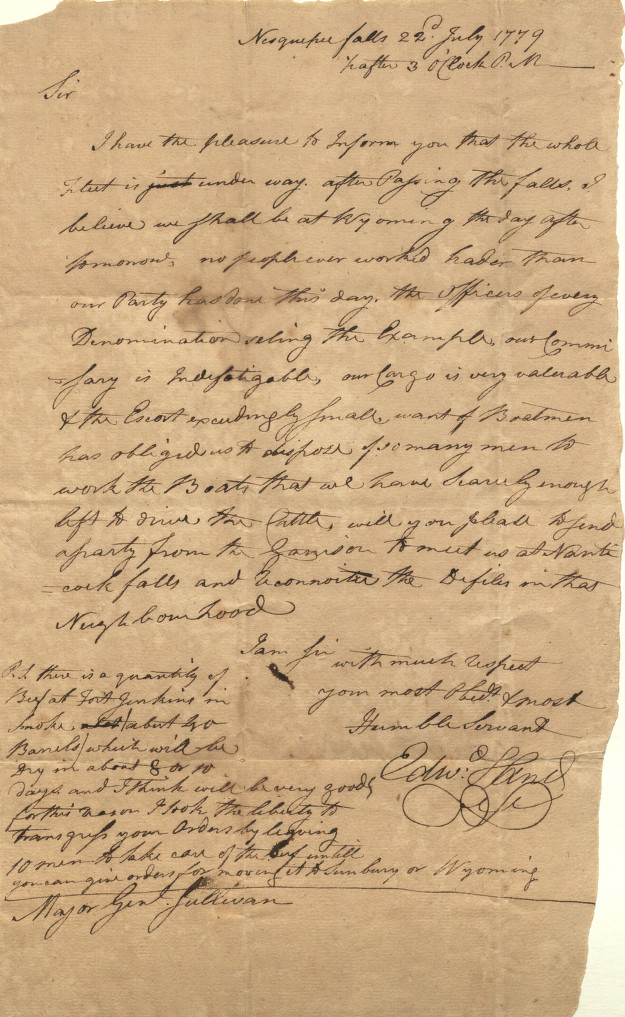
Letter from General Edward Hand,1779

Planning for a campaign against the Iroquois was already under way, and Hand's frontier experience naturally recommended him as a participant. In the resulting Sullivan-Clinton Iroquois Expedition (May–November 1779) through the Southern Tier and Finger Lakes regions of New York, Edward Hand commanded the Third Brigade, composed of the Fourth and Eleventh Pennsylvania Regiments, the German Regiment, Proctor's Artillery, Captain James Parr's Riflemen, Captain Anthony Selin's Riflemen, and two Wyoming companies. The brigade composed the "Light Corps" of Sullivan's army and formed its vanguard. The journals kept by the officers on the expedition indicate that Hand played a major role in the success of the campaign. When he rejoined his family in Lancaster at the close of the year he was thirty-five years old, the youngest of the brigadiers.

Adjutant General of the Continental Army

After a few months, he was appointed Adjutant General of the Continental Army and served during the siege of Yorktown in that capacity. In recognition of his long and distinguished service, he was, in September 1783, promoted by brevet to major general. He resigned from active duty military service in November 1783.

== After the Revolution ==
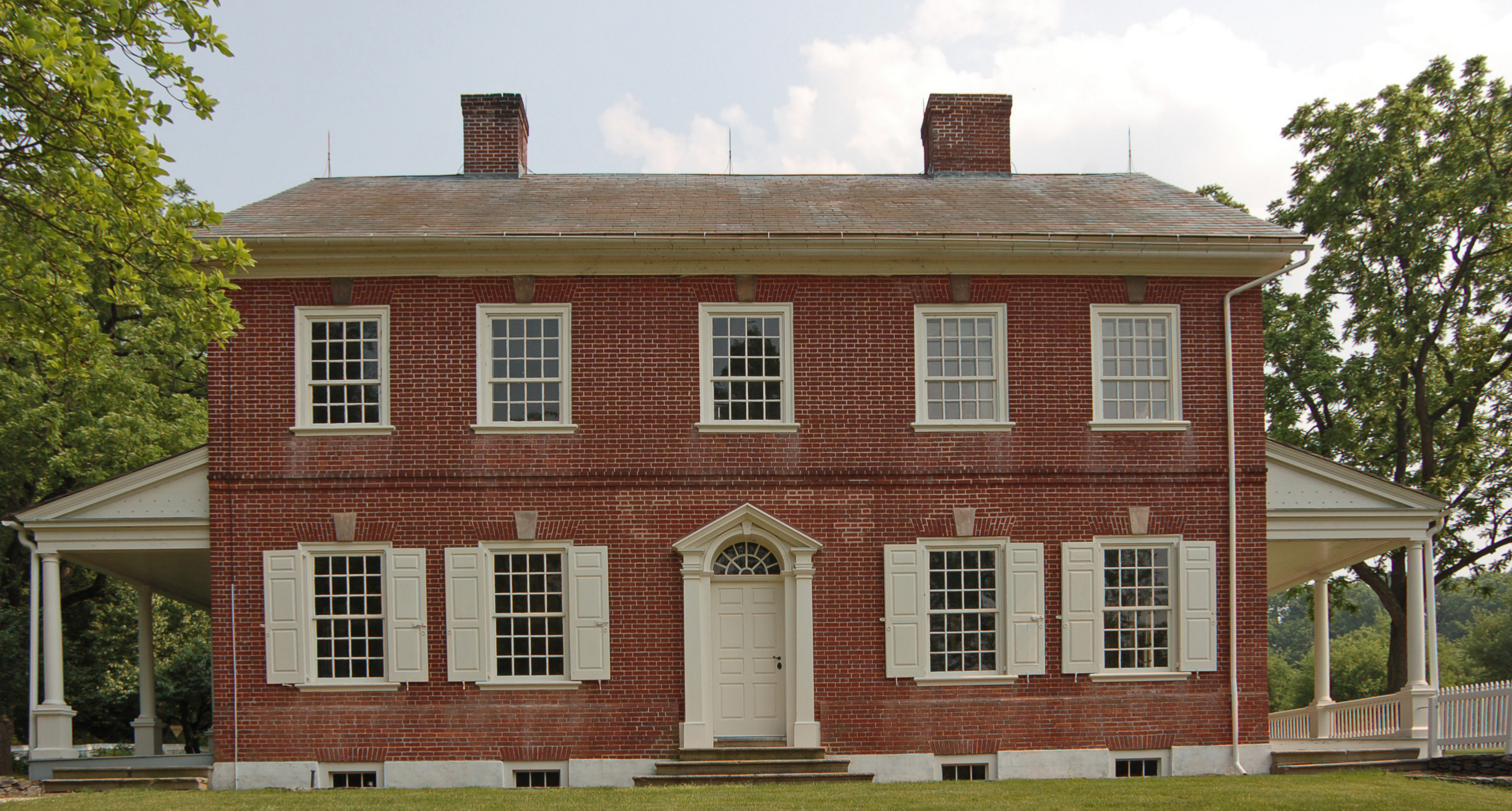
Hand's estate, Rock Ford, in Lancaster, Pennsylvania.

Hand returned to Lancaster and resumed the practice of medicine. Hand was an original member of the Society of the Cincinnati, with his membership card signed by George Washington. A Federalist, Hand was active in civil affairs, holding posts that included:

- Chief Burgess of Lancaster
- Presidential elector
- Delegate to the convention for the 1790 Pennsylvania Constitution
- Member of the Congress of the Confederation, 1784–1785
- Member of the Pennsylvania Assembly, 1785–1786

Beginning in 1785, he owned and operated Rock Ford, a 177-acre (0.72 km^{2}) plantation (Note: Historic Rock Ford was variously described as a farm or plantation in contemporary sources. However, the definition of plantation has evolved considerably over time. When describing Rock Ford, the term "plantation" does not imply that slaves were used to cultivate the farmland, although the Hands owned up to four slaves for non-agriculture purposes.) on the banks of the Conestoga River, one mile (1.6 km) south of Lancaster, Pennsylvania. The Georgian brick mansion remains today; the farm is a historic site open to the public. Hand was also an enslaver, owning several enslaved people, one of whom, Frank, ran away in 1802.

== Civic life ==
Hand was an early benefactor of Franklin & Marshall College, then called "Franklin College." Hand served on the college's Board of Trustees, alongside other prominent Lancaster figures. Three of Hand's daughters eventually attended the former Franklin College.

== Death ==
Hand is suspected to have died from typhoid, dysentery or pneumonia at Rock Ford in 1802. Medical records are unclear, but some sources state Hand died of cholera. There is no evidence Lancaster County suffered from a cholera epidemic in 1802. Hand is buried in St. James's Episcopal Cemetery in Lancaster, the same church where he had served as a deacon.

== Notes ==
Military offices
Preceded by Alexander Scammel	Adjutant Generals of the U. S. Army; 8 January 1781 – 3 November 1783	Succeeded by William North
