= Lake George Battlefield Park Historic District =

Historic district in New York, United States

- U.S. National Register of Historic Places
- U.S. Historic district
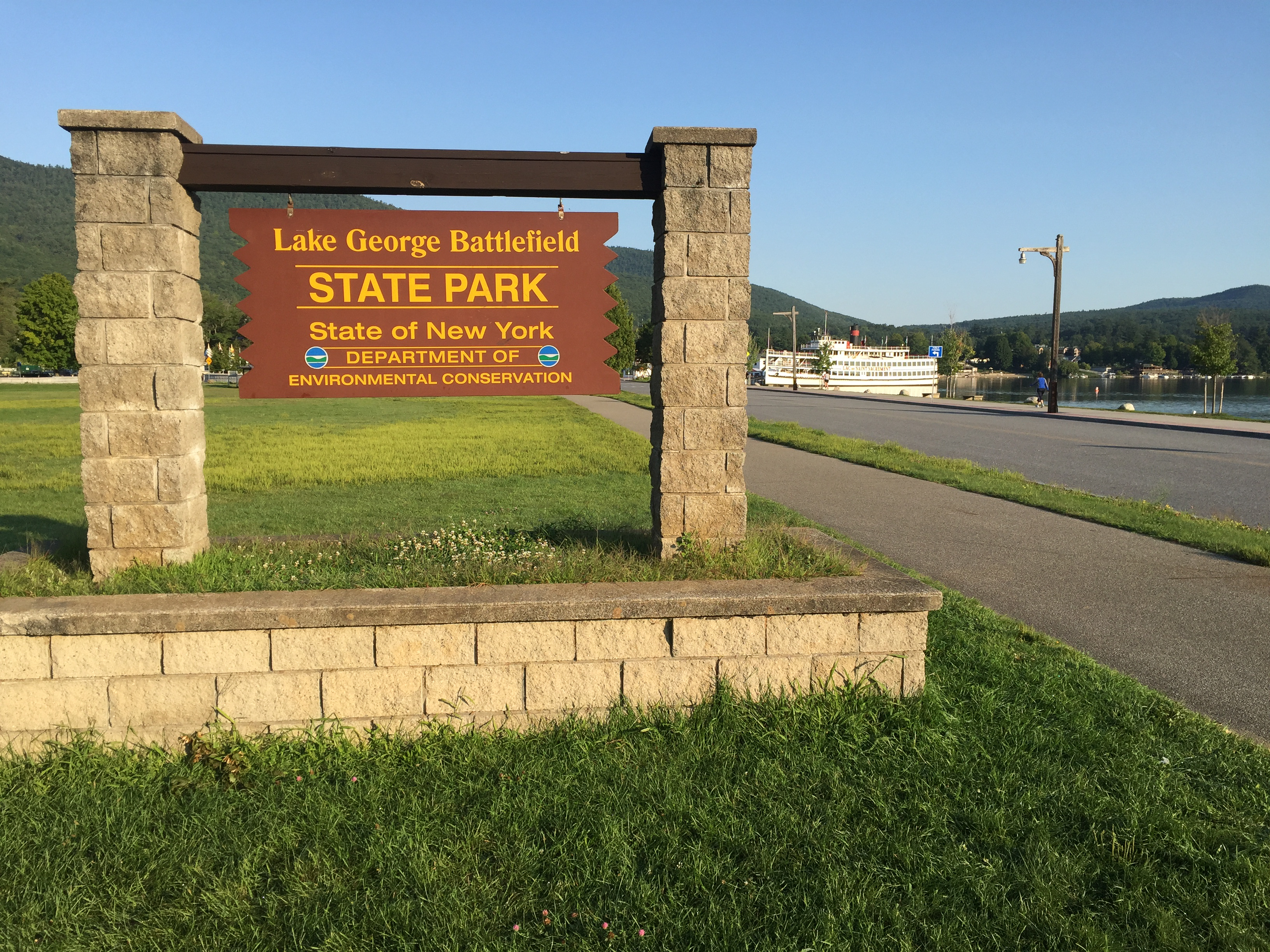

- Location within New York Location within the United States
- Location: 139 Beach Rd., near Lake George, New York
- Coordinates: 43°25′22″N 73°42′50″W
- Area: 118 acres (48 ha)
- Built: c. 1755-1814, 1896-1965
- NRHP reference No.: 11000971
- Added to NRHP: December 30, 2011

Lake George Battlefield Park Historic District is a national historic district relating to the French and Indian War Battle of Lake George and located near Lake George in Warren County, New York. The parkland was purchased and developed by New York State between 1896 and 1965. It encompasses numerous significant archaeological sites related to a series of conflicts dated from about 1755 to 1814. The archaeological sites include those related to Fort George (1759), earthen trenches (1757-1758), and barracks and hospitals dated to the 1750s. The historic districts also includes a number of plaques and monuments including those commemorating Henry Knox (1925), the Bloody Morning Scout (1935), Fr. Isaac Jogues (1939), King Hendrick Theyanoguin and General William Johnson. Other contributing features relate to the property's development as a park and include the battlefield park and battlefield campground, Fort George Road, the Delaware and Hudson Railway right of way (c. 1880), the Dowling Farmhouse (c. 1870), and the maintenance complex (c. 1890-c. 1920s).

It was listed on the National Register of Historic Places in 2011.

== See also ==
- National Register of Historic Places listings in Warren County, New York
