= Matthias Alexis Roche de Fermoy =

French general in the American Continental Army

Matthias Fermoy
- Born: c. 1737; North America
- Died: c. 1780 (aged c. 43)
- Military career
- Allegiance: United States
- Service years: 1776-1778
- Conflicts: American Revolutionary War; Battle of Trenton; Siege of Fort Ticonderoga

Matthias Alexis Roche de Fermoy (c. 1737 – c. 1780) was a French volunteer soldier who served as a brigadier general in the Continental Army. Born in the West Indies, he was one of several foreigners given command positions in the army in 1776 (Marquis de Lafayette being one of the more famous of these). Fermoy's tenure as a brigadier general was marked by disgrace. Although he performed competently leading a brigade during the Battle of Trenton, he abandoned his brigade while it occupied a forward defensive position opposing the British advance prior to the Battle of the Assunpink Creek. In July 1777, his force was occupying Mount Independence, part of the defenses around Fort Ticonderoga in northern New York, prior to General John Burgoyne's advance. When the decision was made to secretly abandon the works on the morning of July 6, Fermoy endangered the operation by setting fire to his quarters at 2 am. After he was rejected for promotion to major general, he resigned in January 1778, and returned to the West Indies.
