= Battle of the Assunpink Creek =

1777 battle of the American Revolutionary War

- Part of the New York and New Jersey campaign
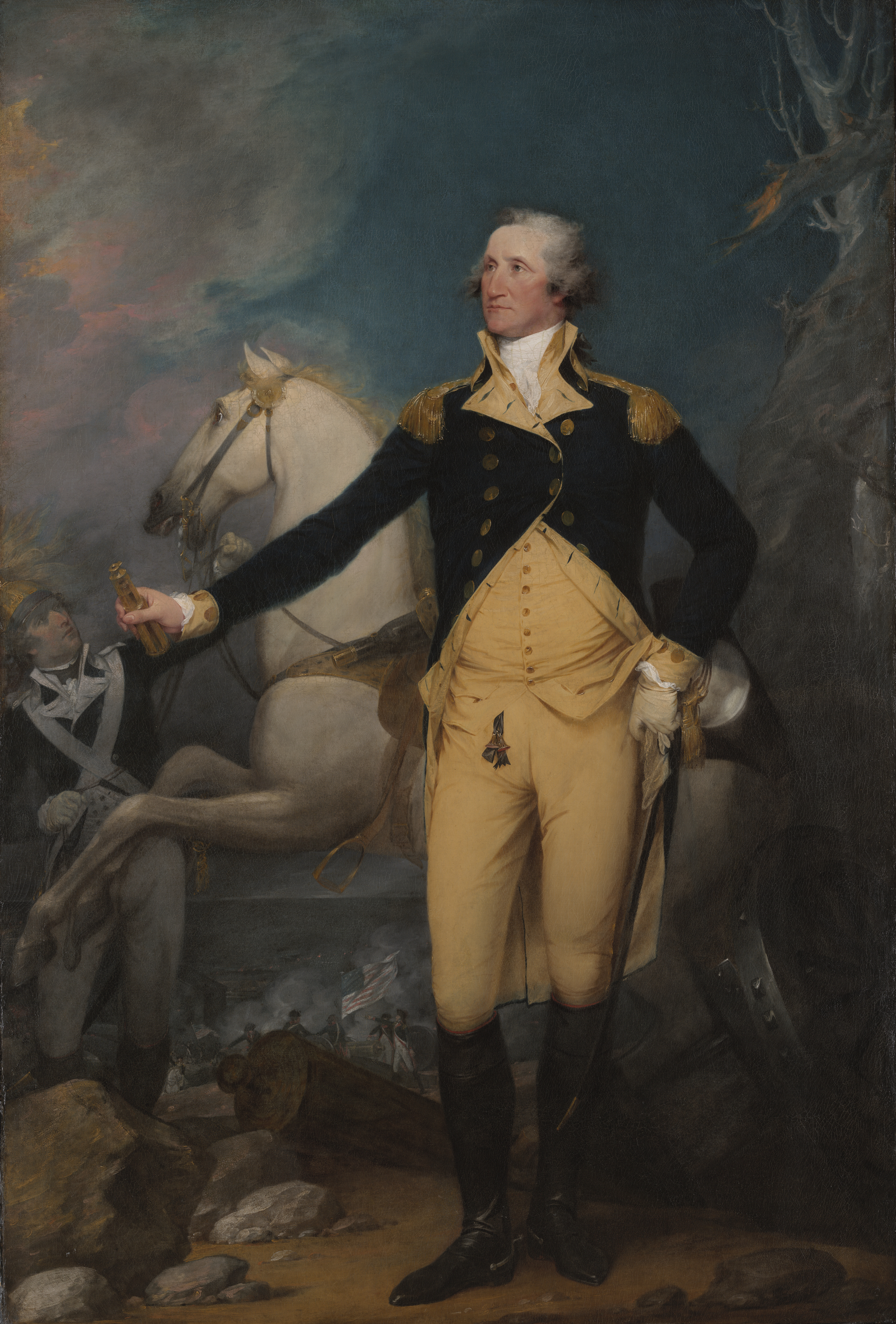
- General George Washington at Trenton; John Trumbull, 1792
Date	January 2, 1777
Location	Trenton, New Jersey 40°13′05″N 74°45′51″W
Result	American victory

Belligerents
United States	Great Britain

Commanders and leaders
(United States) George Washington	(Kingdom of Great Britain) Charles Cornwallis

Strength
6,000; 40 guns	5,000; 28 guns

Casualties and losses
7–100 killed or wounded	55–365 killed, wounded or captured
- Location within USA Midwest and Northeast Battle of the Assunpink Creek (New Jersey)

The Battle of the Assunpink Creek, also known as the Second Battle of Trenton, was a battle between American and British troops that took place in and around Trenton, New Jersey, on January 2, 1777, during the American Revolutionary War, and resulted in an American victory.

Following the victory at the Battle of Trenton early in the morning of December 26, 1776, General George Washington of the Continental Army and his war council expected a strong British counterattack. Washington and the council decided to meet this attack in Trenton and established a defensive position south of the Assunpink Creek.

Lieutenant General Charles Cornwallis led the British forces southward in the aftermath of the December 26 battle. Leaving 1,400 men under Lieutenant Colonel Charles Mawhood in Princeton, Cornwallis advanced on Trenton with about 5,000 men on January 2. His advance was significantly slowed by defensive skirmishing by American riflemen under the command of Edward Hand, and the advance guard did not reach Trenton until twilight. After assaulting the American positions three times and being repulsed each time, Cornwallis decided to wait and finish the battle the next day. Washington moved his army around Cornwallis's camp that night and attacked Mawhood at Princeton the next day. That defeat prompted the British to withdraw from most of New Jersey for the winter.

== Background ==
On the night of December 25–26, 1776, George Washington, Commander-in-Chief of the Continental Army, crossed the Delaware River with his army, and attacked the Hessian garrison at the Battle of Trenton on the morning of December 26. The Hessian garrison was surrounded and quickly defeated. Washington crossed the river again and returned to his camp in Pennsylvania that afternoon. On December 30, Washington moved his army back to Trenton and stationed his men on the south side of the Assunpink Creek.

== Prelude ==
=== Washington's appeal ===
At Trenton, Washington faced a dilemma. All but a handful of his men's enlistments were expiring on December 31, and he knew that the army would collapse unless he convinced them to stay. So, on December 30, Washington appealed to his men to stay one month longer for a bounty of ten dollars. He asked any men who wanted to volunteer to poise their firelocks, but no man turned out. Washington then wheeled his horse around and rode in front of the troops, saying, "My brave fellows, you have done all I asked you to do, and more than could be reasonably expected; but your country is at stake, your wives, your houses and all that you hold dear. You have worn yourselves out with fatigues and hardships, but we know not how to spare you. If you will consent to stay only one month longer, you will render that service to the cause of liberty and to your country which you probably never can do under any other circumstances." At first, no one stepped forward, but then one soldier stepped forward, and he was followed by most of the others, leaving only a few in the original line.

=== Preparations ===
On January 1, 1777, money from the Continental Congress arrived in Trenton, and the men were paid. Washington also received a series of resolves from Congress, including one that gave Washington powers similar to those of a military dictator. Washington decided that he would stand and fight at Trenton and ordered General John Cadwalader, who was at Crosswicks with 1,800 militia, to join him in Trenton. On December 31, Washington learned that an army of 8,000 men under the command of General Cornwallis was moving to attack him at Trenton.

Washington ordered his men to build earthworks that were parallel to the south bank of the Assunpink Creek southeast of Trenton proper (near the modern location of the Trenton Transit Center). The lines extended about three miles (4.8 km) down the south end of the stream. However, one of Washington's aides, Joseph Reed, pointed out that there were fords upstream that the British could cross, and then they would be in position to drive in Washington's right flank. Washington could not escape across the Delaware because all of his boats were a few miles upstream. Washington told his officers that he planned to move the army and that their current position was only temporary.

=== British movement ===
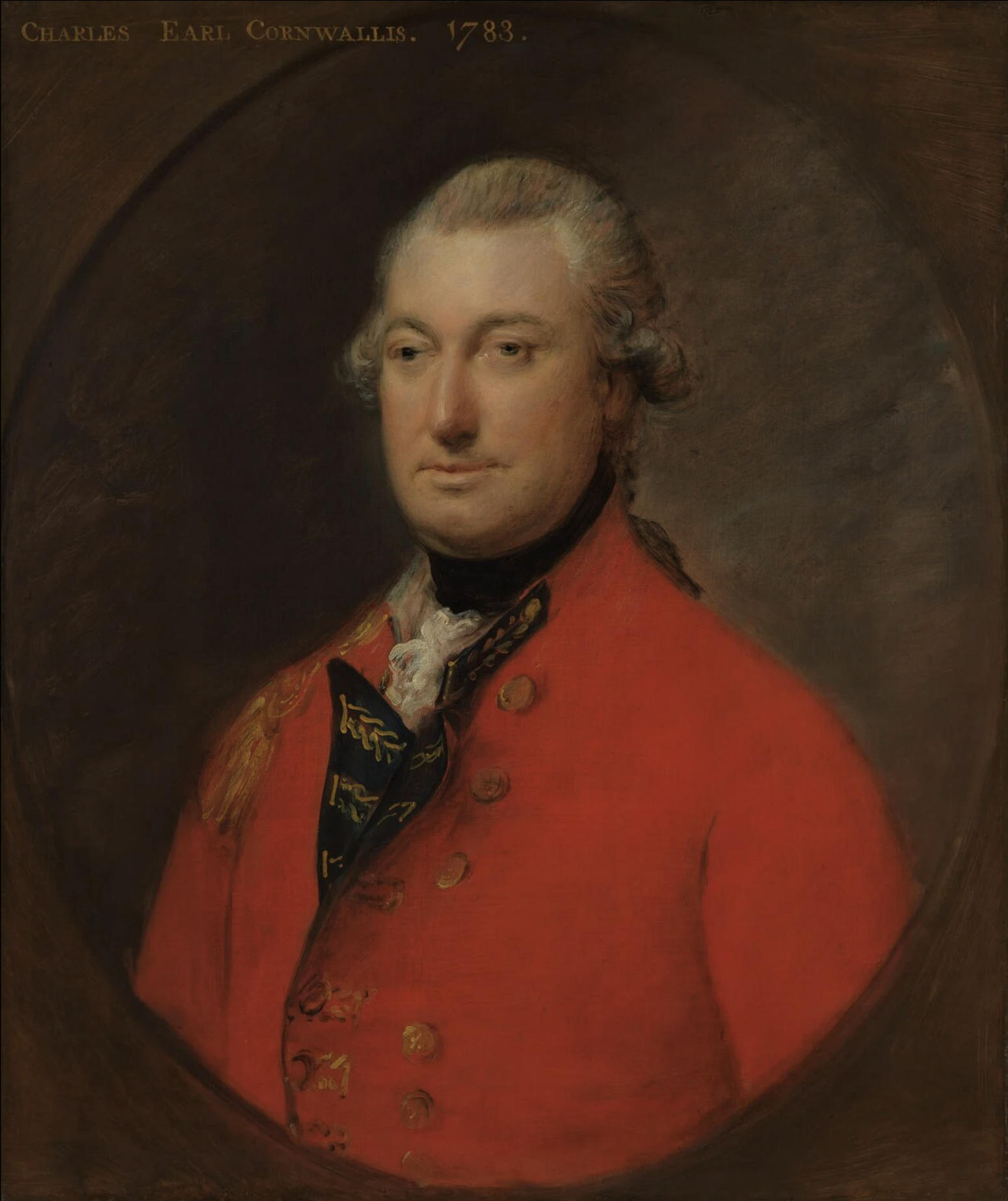
Charles, Earl Cornwallis, portrait by Thomas Gainsborough

Cornwallis, planning to return to Britain, had his leave canceled. He rode to Princeton to catch up with General James Grant, who had moved with 1,000 troops to reinforce Princeton. Cornwallis arrived and was convinced by Grant and Carl von Donop to attack Trenton with their combined forces.

By January 1, 1777, Cornwallis and his army had reached Princeton. On January 2, Cornwallis left part of his force there under the command of Charles Mawhood, and with 5,500 men, set off down the road to Trenton, 11 miles (18 km) away. Cornwallis's army had 28 cannon and marched in three columns. When Cornwallis reached Maidenhead (now Lawrenceville), he detached Colonel Alexander Leslie with 1,500 men and ordered them to remain there until the following morning.

== Battle ==
=== Delaying actions ===
Out in front of his army, Cornwallis placed a skirmish line of Hessian jägers and British light infantry. Two days before, Washington had troops under the command of Matthias Alexis Roche de Fermoy place an outer defensive line halfway between Trenton and Princeton to delay the British advance. As the British approached, Fermoy returned to Trenton, drunk. Colonel Edward Hand took over his command.

As the British came within range, the American riflemen opened fire. The American riflemen took cover in the woods, ravines, and even in bends in the road, and each time the British would line up in a battle line, the riflemen would fall back and fire from cover. After Hand was forced to abandon the American position along Five Mile Run, he took up a new position, a heavily wooded area on the south bank of Shabakunk Creek. Hand deployed his men in the trees where they were so well protected from view that the British could not see them as they crossed the bridge over the stream. The riflemen fired at them from point-blank range. The intense fire confused the British into thinking that the entire American army was up against them, and they formed into battle lines, bringing up their cannon. The British searched the woods for half an hour looking for the Americans, but Hand had already withdrawn to a new position.

By three in the afternoon, the British had reached a ravine known as Stockton Hollow, about half a mile (0.8 km) from Trenton where the Americans were forming another line of defense. Washington wanted to hold the British off until nightfall when darkness would prevent the British from attacking his defenses on the south side of Assunpink Creek. With artillery in position, the British attacked Hand's new position, and he gave way, slowly falling back into Trenton. Hand had his troops fire from behind houses along the way. As Hand's troops came to the creek, the Hessians charged at them with bayonets fixed, causing chaos among the Americans. Washington, seeing the chaos, rode out through the crowd of men crossing the bridge and shouted that Hand's rear guard should pull back and regroup under the cover of the American artillery.

=== British assault ===
As the British prepared to attack the American defenses, cannon, and musket fire were exchanged between the opposing sides. The British moved across the bridge, advancing in solid columns, and the Americans fired together. The British fell back, but only for a moment. The British charged the bridge again but were driven back by cannon fire. The British charged one final time, but the Americans fired canister shot this time, and the British lines were raked with fire. One soldier said, "The bridge looked red as blood, with their killed and wounded and their red coats."

== American withdrawal ==
=== Cornwallis' decision ===
When Cornwallis arrived in Trenton with the main army, he called a council of war to determine whether he should continue to attack. Cornwallis' quartermaster general, William Erskine, urged Cornwallis to strike right away, saying, "If Washington is the General I take him to be, his army will not be found there in the morning." But James Grant disagreed and argued that there was no way for the Americans to retreat, and that the British troops were worn out, and that it would be better for them to attack in the morning after they had rested. Cornwallis did not want to wait until morning, but he decided it would be better than sending his troops out to attack in the dark. Cornwallis said, "We've got the old fox safe now. We'll go over and bag him in the morning." Cornwallis then moved his army to a hill north of Trenton for the night.

=== Washington's decision ===
During the night, the American artillery, under the command of Henry Knox, occasionally fired shells into Trenton to keep the British on edge. As Cornwallis had, Washington also called for a council of war. He would take the little-known Quaker road leading to Princeton, and his council of war agreed to attack the British garrison there. By 2 am on January 3, the army was on its way to Princeton. Washington left behind 500 men and two cannons to keep the fires burning and to make noise with picks and shovels to make the British think they were digging in. By morning, these men, too, had evacuated, and when the British came to attack, all of the American troops were gone.

== Casualties ==
Casualty estimates are widely divergent. Howard Peckham records the fighting on January 2 as two separate engagements, which he categorizes as "skirmishes". In the first, at Five Mile Run, he gives no American losses. In the second, at Stockton Hollow, he gives the American casualties as 6 killed, 10 wounded and 1 deserted. William S. Stryker, on the other hand, gives the entire American loss on January 2 as 1 killed and 6 wounded, while David Hackett Fischer says that they had 100 killed and wounded.

Peckham gives the British losses at Five Mile Run as 1 Hessian killed and those for Stockton Hollow as "at least" 10 killed, 20 wounded and 25 captured. Edward J. Lowell gives the Hessian losses on January 2 as 4 killed and 11 wounded. David Hackett Fischer gives the British casualties as 365 killed, wounded or captured.

== Aftermath ==
By the morning of January 3, Washington had reached Princeton. After a brief battle, the British there were decisively defeated, and a substantial number of the garrison under the command of Mawhood was captured. With their third defeat in ten days, Cornwallis' superior, General William Howe, ordered the army to withdraw from southern New Jersey and nearly back to New York. This they did, leaving forward positions at New Brunswick. Washington moved his army to Morristown for winter quarters.

== Legacy ==
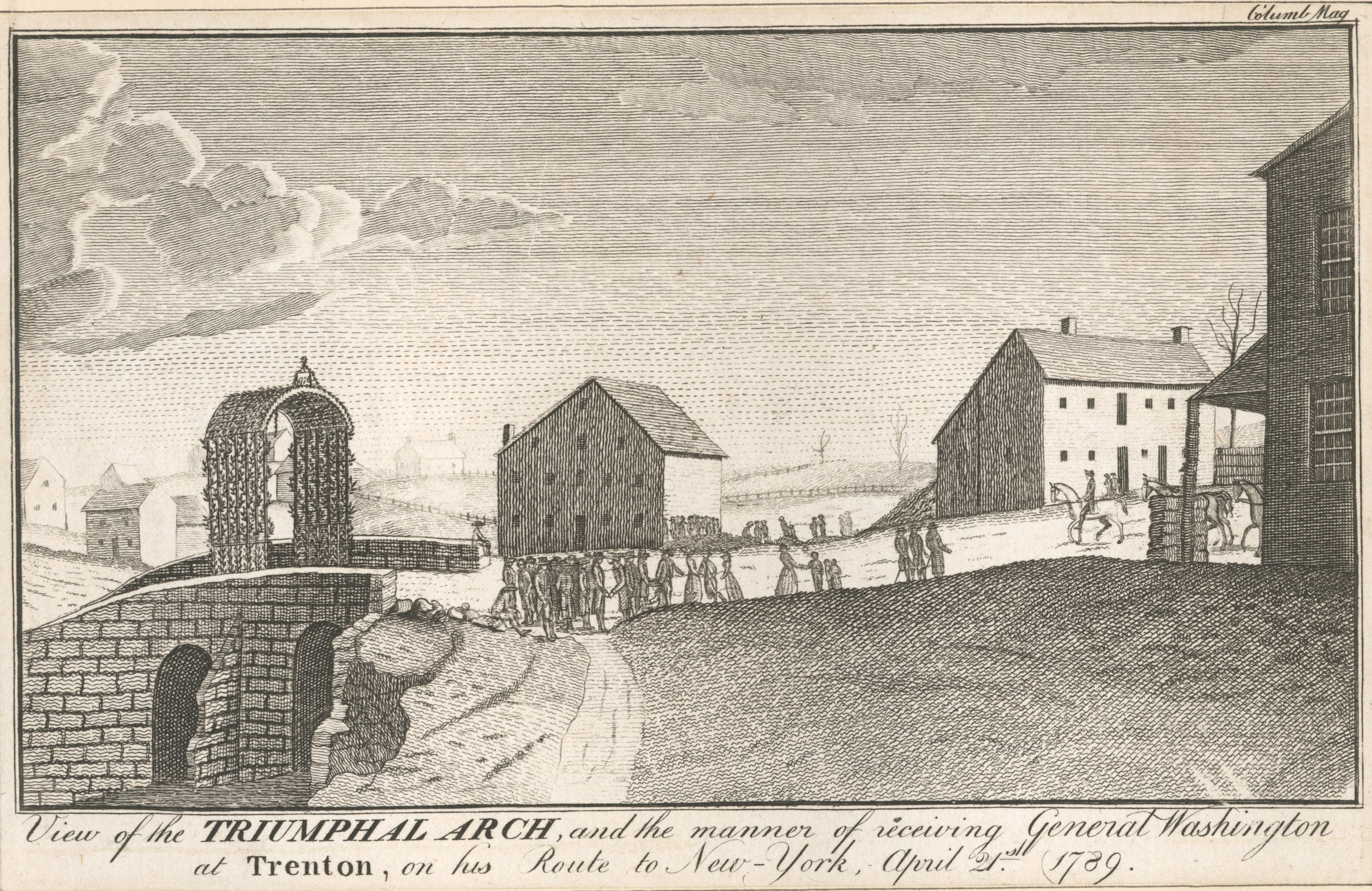
The bridge over the Assunpink Creek as shown in the View of the Triumphal Arch, engraving attributed to James Trenchard, 1789

The battle was commemorated on April 21, 1789, with a triumphal arch erected on the bridge over the Assunpink Creek during George Washington's reception at Trenton on his way to his first inauguration.

In 1792, American artist John Trumbull painted the full-length portrait of Washington, General George Washington at Trenton, showing him after the day's battle standing south of the bridge over the Assunpink Creek.

== See also ==
- American Revolutionary War § British New York counter-offensive. The 'Battle of Assunpink Creek' placed in overall sequence and strategic context.
- Battle of Trenton – also known as the First Battle of Trenton, fought one week earlier
- Battle of Princeton – battle on the following day
