= List of Continental Army units (1777–1784) =

The Continental Army was the army raised by the Second Continental Congress to oppose the British Army during the American Revolutionary War. The army went through three major establishments: the first in 1775, the second in 1776, and the third from 1777 until after the end of the war.

The Continental Army of 1777 was a result of several critical reforms and political decisions that came about when it was apparent that the British were sending massive forces to put an end to the Revolution. In order to create a more stable, better trained army that would not cease to exist at the end of each year — the army had nearly collapsed at the end of 1776 — men were now required to enlist for either three years, or for the duration of the war.

== Third establishment ==
On September 16, 1776, the Continental Congress passed the "eighty-eight battalion resolve", which called for each state to contribute regiments in proportion to their population. (The terms regiment and battalion were virtually interchangeable at that time since nearly every Continental Army regiment consisted of a single battalion). The quota of infantry regiments was fixed at 15 each from Massachusetts and Virginia, 12 from Pennsylvania, 9 from North Carolina, 8 each from Connecticut and Maryland, 6 from South Carolina, 4 each from New York and New Jersey, 3 from New Hampshire, 2 from Rhode Island, and 1 each from Delaware and Georgia. Each state was expected to arm, clothe, and equip its regiments. A state's quota of infantry regiments was collectively known as that state's "line", such as the Pennsylvania Line. A state "line" was an administrative designation and not a tactical formation like a brigade or division.

Washington and his generals believed that 88 regiments were insufficient to challenge the British Army, and so on December 27, 1776, Congress gave Washington the authority to raise additional regiments which were placed directly under his control and not under any state. These additional units consisted of 16 infantry regiments, three artillery regiments, a corps of engineers, and 3,000 light horsemen. Including three other regiments previously authorized by Congress (the two Canadian regiments and Seth Warner's regiment of Green Mountain Boys), 110 regiments were authorized for the Continental Army of 1777. Some states exceeded their quotas, and so 119 regiments were actually fielded in 1777.

The decisions implemented in 1777 determined the basic organizational structure of the Continental Army for the duration of the war. Although the army raised in 1777 was the army which served until the close of the war, the Continental Army of 1777 underwent a general reorganization on three important occasions.

On 27 May 1778 Congress reduced the quota of infantry regiments in the state lines to 80. The new regiments were smaller by one-third to cut expenses, and for the first time included a permanent light infantry company. The quota of infantry regiments was so adjusted that Massachusetts provided 15, Pennsylvania and Virginia each provided 11, Connecticut and Maryland each provided 8, North Carolina and South Carolina each provided 6, New York provided 5, New Hampshire and New Jersey each provided 3, Rhode Island provided 2, and Delaware and Georgia each provided 1. Congress also consolidated some of the weaker Additional Continental Regiments. Because this reorganization was proposed just as the campaign of 1778 was about to begin, it was implemented gradually over the next ten months, and finalized on March 9, 1779.

In October 1780, with the three-year enlistments of 1777 soon to expire, the Continental Congress ordered a new organization of the Continental Army, to become effective on January 1, 1781. The number of infantry regiments was reduced to 50 (including Hazen’s 2d Canadian Regiment, which was retained as the Canadian Regiment). The new regiments were larger, and for the first time they included a regimental depot. The quota of infantry regiments was fixed at 10 from Massachusetts, 8 from Virginia, 6 from Pennsylvania, 5 each from Connecticut and Maryland, 4 from North Carolina, 2 each from New Hampshire, New York, New Jersey, and South Carolina, and 1 each from Rhode Island, Delaware, and Georgia. The few Additional Continental Regiments that had survived to this late date were either allotted to a state line or disbanded. The support of the Continental Army’s cavalry and artillery regiments was also made the responsibility of a definite state for the first time, but they retained their status as separate branches of the Continental Army.

As of January 1, 1781, the states were made responsible for regiments in other branches as follows: 1st and 3rd Legionary Corps (formerly 1st and 3d Light Dragoons): Virginia; 2d Legionary Corps (2nd Light Dragoons): Connecticut; and 4th Legionary Corps (4th Light Dragoons): Pennsylvania — 1st Artillery: Virginia; 2d Artillery: New York; 3d Artillery: Massachusetts; and 4th Artillery: Pennsylvania.

Thus the total number of regimental equivalents was reduced to 61. This number included 50 infantry regiments, 4 legionary corps (which were partly dismounted light dragoons), 4 artillery regiments, 2 partisan corps, and 1 artificer regiment.

Finally, on August 7, 1782, the Continental Congress resolved that the Continental Army should be so reduced that, if possible, all its units should contain at least 500 rank and file. This reorganization was to become effective on January 1, 1783. Under this resolve, the infantry of the Continental Army was reorganized to consist of 1 regiment and 1 battalion (4 companies) from New Hampshire (effected March 1, 1783), 8 regiments from Massachusetts, 1 battalion (6 companies) from Rhode Island, 3 regiments from Connecticut, 2 regiments from New York, 1 regiment and 1 battalion (4 companies) from New Jersey (effected March 1, 1783), 3 regiments from Pennsylvania, 1 regiment (2 companies) from Delaware, 2 regiments from Maryland, 2 regiments from Virginia, 1 regiment and 1 battalion from North Carolina, 2 regiments from South Carolina, and 1 regiment (3 companies) from Georgia. In this instance, with some exceptions, the term "battalion" was used to designate a unit with less than the regulation nine companies.

== State lines ==
=== Connecticut ===
The Connecticut Line was assigned a quota of 8 infantry regiments for 1777 and 1778–1779, reduced to 5 infantry regiments for 1781, and to 3 infantry regiments for 1783.

==== 1777 ====
Conn. Rgt.	Authorized on	Consolidated	
Conn. Rgt.	Authorized on	With	On
1st	September 16, 1776	8th	January 1, 1781
2nd	September 16, 1776	9th	January 1, 1781
3rd	September 16, 1776	4th	January 1, 1781
4th	September 16, 1776	3rd	January 1, 1781
5th	September 16, 1776	7th	January 1, 1781
6th	September 16, 1776	Redesignated as the 4th	January 1, 1781
7th	September 16, 1776	5th	January 1, 1781
8th	September 16, 1776	1st	January 1, 1781
9th	Formerly Webb's Additional Continental Regiment. Allotted to Connecticut Line on July 24, 1780.	2nd	January 1, 1781

==== 1781 ====
- 1st Connecticut Regiment (1781) (Constituted in Connecticut Line by consolidation of 3rd and 4th Connecticut Regiments of 1777. Disbanded November 15, 1783).
- 2nd Connecticut Regiment (1781) (Constituted in Connecticut Line by consolidation of 5th and 7th Connecticut Regiments of 1777. Disbanded November 15, 1783).
- 3rd Connecticut Regiment (1781) (Constituted in Connecticut Line by consolidation of 2nd and 9th Connecticut Regiments of 1777. Disbanded November 15, 1783).
- 4th Connecticut Regiment (1781) (Constituted in Connecticut Line by redesignation of 6th Connecticut Regiment of 1777. Disbanded January 1, 1783).
- 5th Connecticut Regiment (1781) (Constituted in Connecticut Line by consolidation of 1st and 8th Connecticut Regiments of 1777. Disbanded January 1, 1783).

=== Delaware ===
The Delaware Line was assigned a quota of 1 infantry regiment for 1777, 1778–1779, and 1781; and a quota of 1 infantry regiment (of 2 companies) for 1783.

- Delaware Regiment (Reauthorized September 16, 1776. Disbanded November 3, 1783).

=== Georgia ===
The Georgia Line was assigned a quota of 1 infantry regiment for 1777, 1778–1779, and 1781; and 1 infantry regiment (of 3 companies) for 1783. Three infantry regiments in excess of the quota were raised outside Georgia.

- 1st Georgia Regiment (Reauthorized September 16, 1776. Captured in Siege of Charleston, May 12, 1780. Redesignated Georgia Regiment January 1, 1781. Redesignated Georgia Battalion January 1, 1783. Disbanded November 15, 1783).
- 2nd Georgia Regiment (Authorized July 5, 1776. Recruited primarily in Virginia. Captured in Siege of Charleston, May 12, 1780. Disbanded January 1, 1781).
- 3rd Georgia Regiment (Authorized July 5, 1776. Recruited primarily in North Carolina. Captured in Siege of Charleston, May 12, 1780. Disbanded January 1, 1781).
- 4th Georgia Regiment (Authorized 1 February 1777. Recruited primarily in Pennsylvania. Captured in Siege of Charleston, May 12, 1780. Disbanded January 1, 1781).

=== Maryland ===
The Maryland Line was assigned a quota of 8 infantry regiments for 1777 and 1778–1779, reduced to 5 infantry regiments for 1781, and to 2 regiments for 1783. (Maryland counted those portions of the German Battalion and the Maryland and Virginia Rifle Regiment that were raised in Maryland as the equivalent of an 8th Maryland regiment).

- 1st Maryland Regiment (1777) (Reauthorized September 16, 1776. Disbanded 15 November 1783).
- 2nd Maryland Regiment (1777) (Reauthorized September 16, 1776. Disbanded 15 November 1783).
- 3rd Maryland Regiment (Authorized September 16, 1776. Disbanded January 1, 1783).
- 4th Maryland Regiment (Authorized September 16, 1776. Disbanded January 1, 1783).
- 5th Maryland Regiment (Authorized September 16, 1776. Disbanded January 1, 1783).
- 6th Maryland Regiment (Authorized September 16, 1776. Disbanded January 1, 1781).
- 7th Maryland Regiment (Authorized September 16, 1776. Disbanded January 1, 1781).

=== Massachusetts ===
The Massachusetts Line was assigned a quota of 15 infantry regiments for 1777 and 1778–1779, reduced to 10 infantry regiments for 1781, and to 8 infantry regiments for 1783.

- 1st Massachusetts Regiment (1777) (Authorized September 16, 1776. Disbanded November 3, 1783).
- 2nd Massachusetts Regiment (1777) (Authorized September 16, 1776. Disbanded November 3, 1783).
- 3rd Massachusetts Regiment (1777) (Authorized September 16, 1776. Disbanded November 3, 1783).
- 4th Massachusetts Regiment (1777) (Authorized September 16, 1776. Disbanded November 3, 1783).
- 5th Massachusetts Regiment (1777) (Authorized September 16, 1776. Disbanded November 15, 1783).
- 6th Massachusetts Regiment (1777) (Authorized September 16, 1776. Disbanded November 15, 1783).
- 7th Massachusetts Regiment (1777) (Authorized September 16, 1776. Disbanded November 15, 1783).
- 8th Massachusetts Regiment (1777) (Authorized September 16, 1776. Disbanded November 15, 1783).
- 9th Massachusetts Regiment (1777) (Authorized September 16, 1776. Disbanded January 1, 1783).
- 10th Massachusetts Regiment (1777) (Authorized September 16, 1776. Disbanded January 1, 1783).
- 11th Massachusetts Regiment (1777) (Authorized September 16, 1776. Disbanded January 1, 1781).
- 12th Massachusetts Regiment (1777) (Authorized September 16, 1776. Disbanded January 1, 1781).
- 13th Massachusetts Regiment (1777) (Authorized September 16, 1776. Disbanded January 1, 1781).
- 14th Massachusetts Regiment (1777) (Authorized September 16, 1776. Disbanded January 1, 1781).
- 15th Massachusetts Regiment (1777) (Authorized September 16, 1776. Disbanded January 1, 1781).
- 16th Massachusetts Regiment (Formerly Jackson's Additional Continental Regiment. Allotted to Massachusetts Line July 24, 1780. Disbanded January 1, 1781).

=== New Hampshire ===
The New Hampshire Line was assigned a quota of 3 infantry regiments for 1777 and 1778–1779, reduced to 2 infantry regiments for 1781, and to 1 regiment and 1 battalion (of 4 companies) for 1783.

- 1st New Hampshire Regiment (1777) (Authorized September 16, 1776. Redesignated New Hampshire Battalion, June 22, 1783. Disbanded January 1, 1784).
- 2nd New Hampshire Regiment (1777) (Authorized September 16, 1776. Redesignated New Hampshire Battalion March 1, 1783. Consolidated with 1st New Hampshire Regiment June 22, 1783).
- 3rd New Hampshire Regiment (1777) (Authorized September 16, 1776. Disbanded January 1, 1781).

=== New Jersey ===
The New Jersey Line was assigned a quota of 4 infantry regiments for 1777, reduced to 3 infantry regiments for 1778–1779, to 2 infantry regiments for 1781, and to 1 regiment and 1 battalion (of 4 companies) for 1783.

- 1st New Jersey Regiment (1777) (Reauthorized September 16, 1776. Disbanded November 15, 1783).
- 2nd New Jersey Regiment (1777) (Reauthorized September 16, 1776. Disbanded November 15, 1783).
- 3rd New Jersey Regiment (1777) (Reauthorized September 16, 1776. Disbanded January 1, 1781).
- 4th New Jersey Regiment (Authorized September 16, 1776. Disbanded February 7, 1779).

=== New York ===
The New York Line was assigned a quota of 4 infantry regiments for 1777, increased to 5 infantry regiments for 1778–1779, and reduced to 2 infantry regiments for 1781 and 1783.

- 1st New York Regiment (1777) (Reauthorized September 16, 1776. Disbanded November 15, 1783).
- 2nd New York Regiment (1777) (Reauthorized September 16, 1776. Disbanded November 15, 1783).
- 3rd New York Regiment (1777) (Reauthorized September 16, 1776. Consolidated with 1st New York Regiment January 1, 1781).
- 4th New York Regiment (1777) (Reauthorized September 16, 1776. Consolidated with 2nd New York Regiment January 1, 1781).
- 5th New York Regiment (Authorized November 30, 1776. Consolidated with 2nd New York Regiment January 1, 1781).

=== North Carolina ===
The North Carolina Line was assigned a quota of 9 infantry regiments for 1777, reduced to 6 infantry regiments for 1778–1779, to 4 infantry regiments for 1781, and to 1 regiment and 1 battalion for 1783.

- 1st North Carolina Regiment (Reauthorized September 16, 1776. Captured in Siege of Charleston, May 12, 1780, later reconstituted. Disbanded November 15, 1783)
- 2nd North Carolina Regiment (Reauthorized September 16, 1776. Captured in Siege of Charleston, May 12, 1780, later reconstituted. Disbanded November 15, 1783)
- 3rd North Carolina Regiment (Reauthorized September 16, 1776. Captured in Siege of Charleston, May 12, 1780, later reconstituted. Disbanded January 1, 1783)
- 4th North Carolina Regiment (Reauthorized September 16, 1776. Captured in Siege of Charleston, May 12, 1780, later reconstituted. Disbanded January 1, 1783)
- 5th North Carolina Regiment (Reauthorized September 16, 1776. Captured in Siege of Charleston, May 12, 1780. Disbanded January 1, 1781)
- 6th North Carolina Regiment (Reauthorized September 16, 1776, Dissolved in late 1779)
- 7th North Carolina Regiment (Authorized September 16, 1776. Disbanded June 1, 1778)
- 8th North Carolina Regiment (Authorized September 16, 1776. Disbanded June 1, 1778)
- 9th North Carolina Regiment (Authorized September 16, 1776. Disbanded June 1, 1778)
- 10th North Carolina Regiment (Authorized April 17, 1777. Disbanded Jun 1, 1778)
- North Carolina Light Dragoons Regiment (placed under Continental Line on March March 7, 1777, disbanded on January 1, 1779)

=== Pennsylvania ===
The Pennsylvania Line was assigned a quota of 12 infantry regiments for 1777, reduced to 11 infantry regiments for 1778–1779, to 6 infantry regiments for 1781, and to 3 infantry regiments for 1783.

- 1st Pennsylvania Regiment (Authorized September 16, 1776. Disbanded November 15, 1783).
- 2nd Pennsylvania Regiment (Authorized September 16, 1776. Disbanded November 15, 1783).
- 3rd Pennsylvania Regiment (Authorized September 16, 1776. Disbanded November 15, 1783).
- 4th Pennsylvania Regiment (Authorized September 16, 1776. Disbanded January 1, 1783).
- 5th Pennsylvania Regiment (Authorized September 16, 1776. Disbanded January 1, 1783).
- 6th Pennsylvania Regiment (Authorized September 16, 1776. Disbanded January 1, 1783).
- 7th Pennsylvania Regiment (Authorized September 16, 1776. Consolidated with 4th Pennsylvania Regiment, January 17, 1781).
- 8th Pennsylvania Regiment (Authorized July 11, 1776. Consolidated with 2nd Pennsylvania Regiment, January 17, 1781).
- 9th Pennsylvania Regiment (Authorized September 16, 1776. Consolidated with 5th Pennsylvania Regiment, January 17, 1781).
- 10th Pennsylvania Regiment (Authorized September 16, 1776. Consolidated with 1st Pennsylvania Regiment, January 17, 1781).
- 11th Pennsylvania Regiment, ("Old Eleventh Pennsylvania Regiment") (Authorized September 16, 1776. Consolidated with 10th Pennsylvania Regiment, July 1, 1778).
- 12th Pennsylvania Regiment (Authorized August 23, 1776. Consolidated with 3rd Pennsylvania Regiment, July 1, 1778).
- 13th Pennsylvania Regiment (Formerly the Pennsylvania State Regiment. Allotted to Pennsylvania Line, November 12, 1777. Consolidated with 2nd Pennsylvania Regiment, July 1, 1778).
- Hartley's Additional Continental Regiment. (Allotted to Pennsylvania Line March 27, 1778. Redesignated 11th Pennsylvania Regiment ("New Eleventh Pennsylvania Regiment") January 13, 1779. Consolidated with 3rd Pennsylvania Regiment, January 17, 1781).

=== Rhode Island ===
The Rhode Island Line was assigned a quota of 2 infantry regiments for 1777 and 1778–1779, reduced to 1 infantry regiment for 1781, and to 1 battalion (of 6 companies) for 1783.

- 1st Rhode Island Regiment (1777) (Authorized September 16, 1776. Redesignated Rhode Island Regiment January 1, 1781. Redesignated Rhode Island Battalion March 1, 1783. Disbanded December 25, 1783).
- 2nd Rhode Island Regiment (1777) (Authorized September 16, 1776. Consolidated with 1st Rhode Island Regiment January 1, 1781).

=== South Carolina ===
The South Carolina Line was assigned a quota of 6 infantry regiments for 1777 and 1778–1779, reduced to 2 infantry regiments for 1781 and 1783. South Carolina raised one of its regiments as an artillery regiment.

- 1st South Carolina Regiment (Reauthorized September 16, 1776. Captured in Siege of Charleston, May 12, 1780. Disbanded November 15, 1783).
- 2nd South Carolina Regiment (Reauthorized September 16, 1776. Captured in Siege of Charleston, May 12, 1780. Disbanded January 1, 1783).
- 3rd South Carolina Regiment (Reauthorized September 16, 1776. Captured in Siege of Charleston, May 12, 1780. Disbanded January 1, 1781).
- 4th South Carolina Regiment (South Carolina Artillery Regiment) (Reauthorized September 16, 1776. Captured in Siege of Charleston, May 12, 1780. Disbanded January 1, 1781).
- 5th South Carolina Regiment (1st South Carolina Rifle Regiment) (Reauthorized September 16, 1776. Converted to ordinary infantry in 1777. Consolidated with 1st South Carolina Regiment, February 11, 1780).
- 6th South Carolina Regiment (2nd South Carolina Rifle Regiment) (Reauthorized September 16, 1776. Converted to ordinary infantry in 1777. Consolidated with 2nd South Carolina Regiment, February 11, 1780).

=== Virginia ===
The Virginia Line was assigned a quota of 15 infantry regiments for 1777, reduced to 11 infantry regiments for 1778–1779, to 8 infantry regiments for 1781, and to 2 infantry regiments for 1783.

- 1st Virginia Regiment (Reauthorized September 16, 1776. Captured in Siege of Charleston, May 12, 1780. Disbanded November 15, 1783).
- 2nd Virginia Regiment (Reauthorized September 16, 1776. Captured in Siege of Charleston, May 12, 1780. Disbanded November 15, 1783).
- 3rd Virginia Regiment (Reauthorized September 16, 1776. Captured in Siege of Charleston, May 12, 1780. Disbanded January 1, 1783).
- 4th Virginia Regiment (Reauthorized September 16, 1776. Captured in Siege of Charleston, May 12, 1780. Disbanded January 1, 1783).
- 5th Virginia Regiment (1777) (Reauthorized September 16, 1776. Consolidated with 3rd Virginia Regiment, May 12, 1779).
- 6th Virginia Regiment (1777) (Reauthorized September 16, 1776. Consolidated with 2nd Virginia Regiment, May 12, 1779).
- 7th Virginia Regiment (1777) (Reauthorized September 16, 1776. Redesignated 5th Virginia Regiment, May 12, 1779).
- 8th Virginia Regiment (1777) (Reauthorized September 16, 1776. Consolidated with 4th Virginia Regiment, May 12, 1779).
- 9th Virginia Regiment (1777) (Reauthorized September 16, 1776. Consolidated with 1st Virginia Regiment, May 12, 1779).
- 10th Virginia Regiment (1777) (Authorized September 16, 1776. Redesignated 6th Virginia Regiment, May 12, 1779).
- 11th Virginia Regiment (1777) (Authorized September 16, 1776. Redesignated 7th Virginia Regiment, May 12, 1779).
- 12th Virginia Regiment (Authorized September 16, 1776. Redesignated 8th Virginia Regiment, May 12, 1779).
- 13th Virginia Regiment (Authorized September 16, 1776. Redesignated 9th Virginia Regiment, May 12, 1779).
- 14th Virginia Regiment (Authorized September 16, 1776. Redesignated 10th Virginia Regiment, May 12, 1779).
- 15th Virginia Regiment (Authorized 16 September 1776. Redesignated 11th Virginia Regiment, 12 May 1779).
- 5th Virginia Regiment (1779) (Constituted in Virginia Line by redesignation of 7th Virginia Regiment of 1777. Captured in Siege of Charleston, May 12, 1780. Disbanded January 1, 1783).
- 6th Virginia Regiment (1779) (Constituted in Virginia Line by redesignation of 10th Virginia Regiment of 1777. Captured in Siege of Charleston, May 12, 1780. Disbanded January 1, 1783).
- 7th Virginia Regiment (1779) (Constituted in Virginia Line by redesignation of 11th Virginia Regiment of 1777. Captured in Siege of Charleston, May 12, 1780. Disbanded January 1, 1781).
- 8th Virginia Regiment (1779) (Constituted in Virginia Line by redesignation of 12th Virginia Regiment of 1777. Captured in Siege of Charleston, May 12, 1780. Disbanded January 1, 1783).
- 9th Virginia Regiment (1779) (Constituted in Virginia Line by redesignation of 13th Virginia Regiment of 1777. Redesignated 7th Virginia Regiment, January 1, 1781).
- 10th Virginia Regiment (1779) (Constituted in Virginia Line by redesignation of 14th Virginia Regiment of 1777. Captured in Siege of Charleston, May 12, 1780. Disbanded January 1, 1781).
- 11th Virginia Regiment (1779) (Constituted in Virginia Line by redesignation of 15th Virginia Regiment of 1777. Captured in Siege of Charleston, May 12, 1780. Disbanded January 1, 1781).
- 7th Virginia Regiment (1781) (Constituted in Virginia Line by redesignation of 9th Virginia Regiment of 1779. Disbanded January 1, 1783).

== "Additional" regiments ==
Units designated "Additional Continental Regiments" were unnumbered infantry regiments authorized in 1777 in addition to the 88 regiments previously authorized by Congress. These units were raised "at large" and not part of any state's quota, although some were later adopted into state lines. Sixteen regiments were authorized, but because of manpower shortages Washington attempted to raise only 15. Two of these 15 were never organized because their colonels declined the position in favor of other commands, leaving 13 "additional" regiments. Congress subsequently authorized one more "additional" regiment, Sheppard's Additional Continental Regiment, but it was absorbed into the weak North Carolina line within a year.

1. Forman's Additional Continental Regiment (New Jersey & Maryland; Colonel David Forman: January 12, 1777 to July 1, 1778; consolidated with Spencer's Additional Continental Regiment on April 1, 1779).
2. Gist's Additional Continental Regiment (Virginia & Maryland; Colonel Nathaniel Gist: January 11, 1777 to January 1, 1781; captured in the Siege of Charleston, May 12, 1780; disbanded January 1, 1781).
3. Grayson's Additional Continental Regiment (Virginia, Maryland, & Delaware; Colonel William Grayson: January 11, 1777 to April 22, 1779; consolidated with Gist's Additional Continental Regiment on April 22, 1779).
4. Hartley's Additional Continental Regiment (Pennsylvania, Maryland, & Delaware; Colonel Thomas Hartley: January 1, 1777 to December 16, 1778; allotted to the Pennsylvania Line on March 27, 1778; designated the 11th Pennsylvania Regiment ("New Eleventh Pennsylvania Regiment") on January 13, 1779; consolidated with the 3rd Pennsylvania Regiment on January 17, 1781).
5. Henley's Additional Continental Regiment (Massachusetts; Colonel David Henley: January 1, 1777 to April 9, 1779; consolidated with Henry Jackson's Additional Continental Regiment on April 9, 1779).
6. Jackson's Additional Continental Regiment (Massachusetts; Colonel Henry Jackson: January 12, 1777 to July 23, 1780; redesignated the 16th Massachusetts Regiment on July 24, 1780)).
7. Lee's Additional Continental Regiment (Massachusetts; Colonel William Raymond Lee: January 1, 1777 to January 24, 1778; field commander, Lieutenant Colonel William Stephens Smith, January 24, 1778 to April 9, 1779; consolidated with Henry Jackson's Additional Continental Regiment on April 9, 1779).
8. Malcolm's Additional Continental Regiment (New York & Pennsylvania; Colonel William Malcolm: April 30, 1777 to April 22, 1779; broken up in 1779, units sent to the 11th Pennsylvania Regiment and Spencer's Additional Continental Regiment).
9. Patton's Additional Continental Regiment (Pennsylvania, New Jersey, & Delaware; Colonel John Patton: January 11, 1777 to February 3, 1778; field commanders: Lieutenant Colonel John Parke to October 29, 1778; Major Joseph Prowell to January 13, 1779; consolidated with Hartley's Additional Continental Regiment on January 13, 1779).
10. Sheppard's Additional Continental Regiment (North Carolina; unofficially designated the 10th North Carolina Regiment; Colonel Abraham Sheppard: April 17, 1777 to June 1, 1778; disbanded 1778).
11. Sherburne's Additional Continental Regiment (Rhode Island & Connecticut; Colonel Henry Sherburne: January 12, 1777 to January 1, 1781; disbanded in 1781).
12. Spencer's Additional Continental Regiment (New Jersey & Pennsylvania; Colonel Oliver Spencer: January 15, 1777 to January 1, 1781; disbanded in 1781).
13. Thruston's Additional Continental Regiment (Virginia; Colonel Charles Mynn Thruston: January 15, 1777 to January 1, 1779; consolidated with Gist's Additional Continental Regiment on April 22, 1779).
14. Webb's Additional Continental Regiment (Connecticut; Colonel Samuel Blatchley Webb: January 1, 1777 to January 1, 1781; adopted into the Connecticut Line on July 24, 1780 as the 9th Connecticut Regiment; consolidated with the 2nd Connecticut Regiment on January 1, 1781).

== "Extra" infantry units ==
Certain permanent infantry units existed in the Continental Army throughout the war which were neither one of the 88 regiments of infantry of the line authorized by the Continental Congress on September 16, 1776, nor one of the 16 additional regiments which the Congress authorized on December 27, 1776 and which Washington raised early in 1777. Historically, these infantry units have been designated the extra regiments and corps of the Continental Army.

- 1st Canadian Regiment (Authorized November 19, 1775. Disbanded January 1, 1781. Colonel James Livingston: November 20, 1775 to January 1, 1781).
- Elmore's Regiment (Connecticut. Authorized January 8, 1776. Disbanded May 10, 1777. Colonel Samuel Elmore).
- 2nd Canadian Regiment (Congress' Own or Hazen's Regiment; after January 1, 1781, The Canadian Regiment) (Authorized January 20, 1776. Disbanded November 15, 1783. Colonel Moses Hazen: January 22, 1776 to June 1, 1783).
- Commander-in-Chief's Guard (Authorized March 11, 1776. Disbanded November 15, 1783).
- Long's Regiment (New Hampshire. Authorized May 14, 1776. Disbanded July 1777).
- Ward's Regiment (Connecticut. Authorized May 14, 1776. Disbanded May 14, 1777. Colonel Andrew Ward).
- German Battalion (Authorized May 25, 1776. Disbanded January 1, 1781. Colonel Nicholas Haussegger: 17 July 1776 to 19 March 1777. Colonel Henry Leonard d'Arendt: 19 March 1777 to 1 January 1781).
- Maryland and Virginia Rifle Regiment (Authorized June 17, 1776. Disbanded January 1, 1781)
- Westmoreland (Wyoming) Independent Companies (Connecticut. Authorized August 23, 1776. Consolidated June 23, 1778. Disbanded January 1, 1781. Captains Samuel Ransom and Robert Durkee).
- New Hampshire Rangers (Whitcomb's Rangers) (Authorized October 15, 1776. Disbanded January 1, 1781).

== Continental Light Dragoons ==
The Continental Corps of Light Dragoons was created in 1777 as an element of the third establishment of the Continental Army, raised for the duration of the war as reconnaissance and scouting troops. It consisted of four regiments, each authorized to raise six troops and 280 men. Its only commander was Casimir Pulaski, who was appointed a brigadier general in the Continental Army on September 15, 1777. Pulaski withdrew from command on March 28, 1778, after friction with his subordinate commanders, to organize a partisan corps, Pulaski's Legion. No Chief of Cavalry was appointed to succeed him. The brigade of cavalry as an offensive weapon was dissolved in 1778 and the regiments distributed geographically, where they operated in troop-sized detachments. In the 1778 reorganization, the light dragoon regiments theoretically gained strength: authorizations of troop strength increased from 44 to 68 men, and regimental musters to 415 men. None of the light dragoon regiments came close to meeting this mark, averaging 120 to 180 men during their active campaigns, nor were they able to mount more than a majority of those enlisted. In 1780 attrition to the 1st and 3rd resulted in their unofficial amalgamation.

On January 1, 1781, in official acceptance of existing practices, the light dragoons were converted into "legionary corps" along European lines by the dismounting of two of their six troops, with two corps allotted to the Main Army and two to the Southern Department. In the same manner, 1782 saw the 1st and 3rd Legionary Corps officially consolidated into a single unit.

- 1st Continental Light Dragoons ("Bland's Horse") (Lt. Col. Theodoric Bland: March 31, 1777 to December 10, 1779. Lt-Col. Anthony Walton White: February 16, 1780 to November 9, 1782. Placed on the Virginia quota on January 1, 1781 and became 1st Legionary Corps; merged with 3rd Legionary Corps in 1782).
- 2nd Continental Light Dragoons ("Sheldon's Horse") (Colonel Elisha Sheldon: December 12, 1776 to close of war. Placed on the Connecticut quota on January 1, 1781 and became 2nd Legionary Corps).
- 3rd Continental Light Dragoons ("Baylor's Horse" or "Lady Washington's Horse") (Lt.Col. George Baylor: January 9, 1777 to September 28, 1778; Lt-Col. William Washington: November 20, 1778 to September 8, 1781. Lt. Col. George Baylor: June 1782 to end of war. Placed on the Virginia quota on January 1, 1781 and became 3rd Legionary Corps; merged with 1st Legionary Corps in 1782).
- 4th Continental Light Dragoons ("Moylan's Horse") (Lt. Col. Stephen Moylan: January 5, 1777 to close of war. Placed on the Pennsylvania quota on January 1, 1781 and became 4th Legionary Corps).

Two state regiments of light dragoons served with the Southern Army:

- Corps of North Carolina Light Dragoons (Three troops, July 31, 1776 to January 1, 1779, when disbanded).
- Georgia Regiment of Horse Rangers (Captured in the Siege of Charleston, May 12, 1780. Disbanded 1781).

== Continental Artillery ==
In 1777 the Continental Artillery was increased from a single regiment to a brigade of four regiments, under Henry Knox. Knox was promoted to the rank of brigadier general on December 27, 1776, and to the rank of major general on November 15, 1781. He served as Washington's Chief of Artillery to the close of the war.

- 1st Continental Artillery Regiment (Harrison's Continental Artillery Regiment), Colonel Charles Harrison: November 30, 1776 to January 1, 1783. Placed on the Virginia quota on January 1, 1781.
- 2nd Continental Artillery Regiment (Lamb's Continental Artillery Regiment), Colonel John Lamb: January 1, 1777 to June 1783. Placed on the New York quota on January 1, 1781.
- 3rd Continental Artillery Regiment (Crane's Continental Artillery Regiment), Colonel John Crane: January 1, 1777; Brevet Brigadier General, September 30, 1783; served to close of war. Placed on the Massachusetts quota on January 1, 1781. Crane's Regiment included the United Train of Artillery of Rhode Island Colony.
- 4th Continental Artillery Regiment (Proctor's Continental Artillery Regiment), Colonel Thomas Proctor: February 5, 1777 to April 18, 1781. Placed on the Pennsylvania quota on January 1, 1781. Proctor's Regiment included the Eastern Artillery Company of New Jersey Colony.
- North Carolina Continental Artillery Company, Captain John Kingsbury: July 19, 1777 to May 12, 1780; assigned to the Main Army on July 19, 1777.

== Partisan corps ==
Partisan corps were combined-arms units of mounted and infantry troops, organized as battalion-sized forces but often broken down into smaller detachments, mainly intended to engage in high mobility guerrilla warfare.

- Armand's Legion, designated 1st Partisan Corps on 1 January 1781 (Colonel Charles Armand Tuffin, marquis de la Rouërie: 25 June 1778 to close of war. Armand's unit, formerly Ottendorf's Corps, was expanded to form Armand's Legion; the rest became "independent Dragoons").
  - Ottendorf's Corps (Major Nicholas Dietrich, Baron de Ottendorf: 5 December 1776 to 11 June 1777; Lieutenant Colonel Charles Armand Tuffin, Marquis de la Rouërie: 11 June 1777 to 25 June 1778).
  - Pulaski's Legion (Brigadier General Casimir Pulaski: 28 March 1778 to 11 October 1779. Pulaski died of wounds received at Savannah. Pulaski's Legion was consolidated with Armand's Legion on 23 February 1780).
- Lee's Legion, designated 2nd Partisan Corps on 1 January 1781 (Henry "Light Horse Harry" Lee: Major, 7 April 1778; Lieutenant Colonel, 6 November 1780; served to close of war).

== Provost Corps ==
The Provost Corps in the Continental Army consisted of one mounted troop. However, the troop performed the duties of military police rather than of cavalry. They were the forerunners of the US Military Police Corps. Among them was Von Heer's Provost Troop (the Marechaussee Corps), commanded by Captain Bartholomew Von Heer (June 1, 1778; Brevet Major, September 30, 1783; served to close of war).

== Invalid Corps ==
The Corps of Invalids was a separate branch of the Continental Army. It was composed of Continental Army veterans who had become unfit for field duty but who could still usefully serve as guards for magazines, hospitals, and similar installations. The noncommissioned officers were also supposed to be proficient in mathematics because the corps was intended to serve as a military academy in addition to its other duties. The military academy seems to have been a dead letter, but otherwise the corps carried out its duties, most notably at West Point, New York.

- Corps of Invalids (Colonel Lewis Nicola: June 20, 1777 to close of war. Some Invalids remained in service until December 1784).

== Continental Army of 1784 ==
- 1st American Regiment (1783–1784) (Colonel Henry Jackson). {Artillery Company attached to this unit became part of the First American Regiment of 1784-1791-the predecessor of the 3d United States Infantry Regiment (The Old Guard)}
