= Battle of Alligator Creek Bridge =

1778 battle of the American Revolutionary War

Coordinates: 30.5664°N 81.8333°W

Battle of Alligator Bridge
- Part of the American Revolutionary War
Date	June 30, 1778
Location	near present-day Callahan, Florida, United States
Result	British victory

Belligerents
United States	Great Britain

Commanders and leaders
James Screven	Mark Prevost; Thomas Brown

Strength
100 cavalry 100 militia	700 infantry 100 Loyalist militia

Casualties and losses
9 killed Unknown wounded Unknown captured	5 killed Unknown wounded None captured

The Battle of Alligator Bridge took place on June 30, 1778, and was the only major engagement in an unsuccessful campaign to conquer British East Florida during the American Revolutionary War. A detachment of Georgia militiamen under the command of General James Screven chased Thomas Brown's Loyalist company into a large position of British regulars established by British Major Mark Prevost and were turned back.

== Background ==
The frontier between the rebel state of Georgia and the Loyal British province of East Florida was for the first three years of the American Revolutionary War the scene of ongoing raiding. Political and military leaders in Georgia believed that East Florida's capital, St. Augustine, was vulnerable, and repeatedly promoted expeditions to capture it. The first, in 1776, fell apart when Continental Army General Charles Lee was called north shortly after it got underway. The second, in 1777, had command, supply, and logistical issues; only a company of cavalry actually entered East Florida, only to be ambushed in the Battle of Thomas Creek. Following that failure, the Georgians abandoned all their military posts south of the Satilla River.

The southernmost post in Georgia was Fort Howe (previously known as Fort Barrington), on the banks of the Altamaha River, and the northernmost Florida outpost was at Fort Tonyn, in present-day Nassau County, Florida. East Florida Governor Patrick Tonyn had under his command a regiment of rangers led by Lieutenant Colonel Thomas Brown, and several hundred British Army troops under the command of Major General Augustine Prevost. Tonyn and Prevost squabbled over control of Brown's regiment and disagreed on how the province should be defended against the recurring forays from Georgia. Prevost was under orders to stay on the defensive, while Tonyn sought a more vigorous defense. To that end Tonyn deployed Brown's force along the St. Marys River, which (then as now) formed the border. Brown and his men, sometimes with support from Creeks and Seminoles, engaged in regular raids into southern Georgia, harassing the defenders and raiding plantations for cattle to supply some of the province's food needs.

In February 1778 Georgia's assembly authorized Governor John Houstoun to organize a third expedition against East Florida. He was opposed in this idea by the Continental Army's Southern Department commander, General Robert Howe, who (like his counterpart Prevost) sought a more defensive posture. Plans began to take shape in March, taking on some urgency after Brown's rangers captured and burned Fort Howe in a surprise attack. After this event, the Loyalists ranged freely throughout Georgia's backcountry and began recruiting in the upcountry of Georgia and the Carolinas. These actions led Georgia's leadership to conclude that a British invasion of the state was being planned, and military preparations began to accelerate.

In addition to land forces, both sides had coastal naval forces to marshal. Governor Tonyn deployed several ships in the Frederica River, separating Saint Simons Island from the mainland, seeking to neutralize several row galleys in the Georgia arsenal. On April 15 Colonel Samuel Elbert decided to launch an attack against three of them that were anchored near Fort Frederica, a relic of the 1740s War of Jenkins' Ear. In a naval action on April 19, Elbert and the row galleys came upon the becalmed ships and captured three of them.

== Order of battle ==
=== United Colonies ===
The units involved in the second invasion were:

- 3rd South Carolina Regiment (South Carolina Ranger Regiment), cavalry
- Georgia Regiment of Horse Rangers
- 1st South Carolina Regiment
- 1st Georgia Regiment
- 2nd Georgia Regiment
- 3rd Georgia Regiment
- 4th Georgia Regiment
- 6th South Carolina Regiment (2nd South Carolina Rifle Regiment), rifles
- 4th South Carolina Regiment (South Carolina Artillery Regiment), artillery
- 1st and 2nd Georgia Continental Artillery Companies

=== Kingdom of Great Britain ===
The units involved in the defence of British East Florida were:

- East Florida Volunteers (Loyalists)
- 1st East Florida Militia [Regiment]
- 2nd East Florida Militia [Regiment]
- Minorca Volunteer Company, East Florida Militia
- East Florida Rangers (Loyalists)

== Prelude ==
General Howe reluctantly agreed to support the expedition, and in early April Georgia's 400 Continental troops began to move south, occupying the site of Fort Howe on April 14. Over the next month this force grew as Georgia militia and South Carolina Continentals arrived, swelling the force to some 1,300 men by early May. General Howe arrived at Fort Howe on May 10, and began organizing the march south. The conditions in the camp were unpleasant: the weather was hot, and there were frequent desertions (leading to at least 11 executions). The expedition force finally began crossing the Altamaha River on May 28 but moved very slowly, crossing the Satilla on June 21 and reaching the St. Marys River on June 26.

Governor Tonyn and General Prevost were aware of the American progress. Brown and Indian forces continued to perform reconnaissance, occasionally skirmishing with the Americans and testing the security of their camps. General Prevost moved some of his troops forward, placing most of them on the main route to St. Augustine.

At this point the expedition almost broke down because General Howe and Governor Houstoun could not agree on how to proceed. Houstoun wanted to march directly toward St. Augustine, forcing a confrontation with the main British force, while Howe wanted to first capture Fort Tonyn. With the two leaders at an impasse, Howe ordered forces he commanded toward Fort Tonyn, while the Georgia militia under Houstoun's command stayed put. Brown, alerted to this movement, abandoned and burned the fort, retreating into the swamps toward the Nassau River. Howe occupied the ruins of Fort Tonyn on June 29. The way south from the fort led to a bridge across Alligator Creek, a Nassau River tributary about 14 miles (23 km) away, at which Prevost had placed detachments of the 16th and 60th Regiments and some Loyalist rangers led by Daniel McGirth. They had constructed a redoubt of logs and brush to defend the bridge. These forces, numbering about 200, were under the command of General Prevost's younger brother, Major James Marcus Prevost.

== Battle ==
On June 30, Howe sent a force of 100 cavalry under brigadier general James Screven south to locate Brown. Brown ordered a company of men to circle around behind them while the rest of his men hid along the road heading south from the fort. The men Brown sent to flank the Continentals were betrayed by deserters and ambushed, with most of them captured or killed. Brown began moving down the road toward the Alligator Bridge, but was overtaken by Screven's company shortly before he got there. As a result, Brown's men were chased directly into the established British position at the bridge.

There was some initial confusion, because neither Screven's nor Brown's forces had regular uniforms, so the British regulars thought all of those arriving were Brown's men. This changed quickly however, and a firefight broke out. Prevost's regulars quickly took up positions and began firing on Screven's men, while some of Brown's men went around to come at their flank. In pitched battle, men on both sides went down, Screven was wounded, and some of the Patriot militia narrowly escaped being trapped before Screven ordered the retreat.

== Aftermath ==
The next day Major Prevost moved out with his, Brown's and McGirth's men, and surprised a Patriot crew repairing a bridge. Rather than extending themselves, they then decided to retreat, felling trees across the road as they went. The divisions in the American camps, however, meant that there would be no further advance. The Continental forces were out of rice and appealed to the Georgia militia for supplies. The militia finally crossed the Saint Marys on July 6, adding some strength to the Continental force, which had been reduced by disease and desertion to only 400 effective soldiers. The shortage of food and the ongoing command disagreements spelled the end of the expedition, which began its retreat on July 14. This effectively ended the idea in Georgia of gaining control of East Florida. James Screven was killed in a surprise attack led by Thomas Brown in November 1778.

The site of the bridge has long been supposed to be in central Callahan, where a marker has been placed, but some historians believe that the actual site of the bridge was somewhat farther east.
