= Battle of Thomas Creek =

1777 battle of the American Revolutionary War

- Part of the American Revolutionary War
Date	May 17, 1777
Location	Duval County, near present-day Callahan, Florida 30.506800°N 81.792117°W (marker location)
Result	British victory

Belligerents
United States	Great Britain; Muscogee

Commanders and leaders
John Baker	Mark Prevost; Thomas Brown

Strength
100–200 militia	250 infantry, militia, and Indian warriors

Casualties and losses
4–8 killed 9 wounded 31–34 captives (of whom many were later killed)	None reported

The Battle of Thomas Creek, also known as the Thomas Creek Massacre, was an ambush of a small detachment of mounted Georgia Militia by a mixed force of British soldiers, Loyalist militia, and British-allied Indians on May 17, 1777 near the mouth of Thomas Creek in northern East Florida. The encounter was the only major engagement in the second of three failed attempts by American forces to invade East Florida in the early years of the American Revolutionary War.

The invasion attempt consisted of a naval flotilla carrying Continental Army troops and a company of militia cavalry traveling overland. The flotilla was delayed in reaching the rendezvous point, and British intelligence had learned of the expedition and located the cavalry. The British established an ambush, which broke up and scattered the cavalry, taking more than 30 prisoners. The Muscogee were reported to have killed a number of the captives in cold blood afterward in revenge for the death of a member of their own tribe in an earlier skirmish.

Colonel Samuel Elbert, the invasion commander, abandoned the expedition when his flotilla was confronted by narrow channels and prepared British defenses. A 1778 expedition against East Florida failed due to leadership disagreements, although there was a skirmish at Alligator Bridge.

== Background ==
Following a raiding expedition by Loyalist Thomas Brown in February 1777 against his state, Georgia President Button Gwinnett organized an expedition against the capital of British East Florida, St. Augustine. General Robert Howe, commander of the Continental Army's Southern Department, agreed to contribute some Continental forces, and authorized Colonel Samuel Elbert's 2nd Georgia Regiment and Brigadier General Lachlan McIntosh to participate. McIntosh and Gwinnett were bitter political enemies, and could not agree on issues of command and strategy. As a consequence, Howe and the Georgia legislature gave command of the operation to Colonel Elbert. (Another consequence of the disagreement between McIntosh and Gwinnett was a duel they fought on May 16; both men were wounded, and Gwinnett died several days later.) In addition to the 300 Continentals from the 1st and 2nd Georgia Regiments, the expedition included some militia cavalry led by Colonel John Baker. Sources vary on the exact size of Baker's company; it is reported to be either about 100 or 200 men.

The expedition left Sunbury on May 1. Baker's cavalry rode overland while Elbert's Continentals sailed via the inland waterway with the expectation of meeting at Sawpit Bluff, near the mouth of the Nassau River in what is now Duval County, Florida. Baker reached Sawpit Bluff on May 12. The flotilla, under the command of Commodore Oliver Bowen, was delayed by contrary winds, and did not reach Amelia Island until May 18.

== Order of Battle ==
=== Continentals ===
Below is a list of the units involved in the "invasion", though most left half-way through Georgia due to general Charles Lee being called away. The units which were part of the group included

- (detachment) 3rd South Carolina Regiment (South Carolina Ranger Regiment), cavalry unit
- Georgia Regiment of Horse Rangers
- 1st North Carolina Regiment
- 2nd North Carolina Regiment
- 3rd North Carolina Regiment
- (detachment) 2nd South Carolina Regiment
- 1st Georgia Regiment
- 2nd Georgia Regiment
- 3rd Georgia Regiment
- (elements) 5th South Carolina Regiment (1st South Carolina Rifle Regiment)
- 6th South Carolina Regiment (2nd South Carolina Rifle Regiment)
- (detachment) 4th South Carolina Regiment (South Carolina Artillery Regiment)

=== Kingdom of Great Britain ===
The units involved in the defence of British East Florida were:

- East Florida Volunteers (Loyalists)
- 1st East Florida Militia [Regiment]
- 2nd East Florida Militia [Regiment]
- Minorca Volunteer Company, East Florida Militia
- East Florida Rangers (Loyalists)

== Prelude ==
Governor of East Florida Patrick Tonyn was alerted to the Georgia plans in April, and reported that Baker's company had crossed the St. Marys River on May 10. A mixed band of Loyalist rangers and primarily Muscogee Indians led by Lieutenant Colonel Brown continued to be active on the border between the two provinces after the February raid; they discovered Baker's camp. Brown wanted to capture one of the Georgians for questioning, but Baker's patrols were vigilant and the party sent for the purpose was fired on.

On the night of May 14–15 Brown sent 15 Indians to steal Baker's horses. They successfully took some of Baker's horses (sources disagree on the exact number, suggesting either 40 or 100), but were chased down by Baker's men. In the ensuing skirmish the horses were recovered; however, at least one Indian (a Chiaha) was killed, and his body was reported by the British to be mutilated by the Georgians. Governor Tonyn's report of the action, written on June 18, noted that this "greatly exasperated the Savages", which would prove to have disastrous consequences for the Americans.

Worried about the delay of Elbert's force, and having learned from a local resident that authorities had been alerted to the expedition, Baker moved west to find a better strategic location to wait, and encamped on the banks of Thomas Creek, a tributary of the Nassau River. Meanwhile, Brown's Indians and rangers had been reinforced by British regulars under the command of Major Mark Prevost, bringing their total force size to about 200. Their scouts located the American camp on the night of May 16–17.

== Battle ==
Brown's Indians and rangers set up an ambush ahead of Baker's route, while Prevost's regulars advanced in three columns behind Baker. When Baker's column reached the ambush around 9:00 am, Brown's men delivered a surprise volley at 50 yards (46 m) from the front and flank. Baker and his men turned to flee, directly into Prevost's oncoming regulars. The Patriots, already shaken, were quickly overwhelmed by the large numbers of rangers and Indians appearing in the underbrush. About half of the Georgians fled at first sight of the enemy; Baker, his horse taken by one of his companions, escaped into the swamps.

Casualty reports from the encounter vary. David Russell reports that three Georgians were killed, nine wounded, and 31 captured, and that many of the captured were later massacred by vengeful Muscogee. Charles Jones reports similar numbers, except that 34 were taken prisoner, a captive count echoed by William Nester. Edward Cashin claims that 40 prisoners were taken, of whom 16 survived the Muscogee massacre. The National Park Service account of the battle says that eight were killed in the battle, nine wounded, and 31 captured, of whom 15 were later killed. Neither Governor Tonyn nor Lieutenant Colonel Brown reported any casualties on their side.

== Aftermath ==
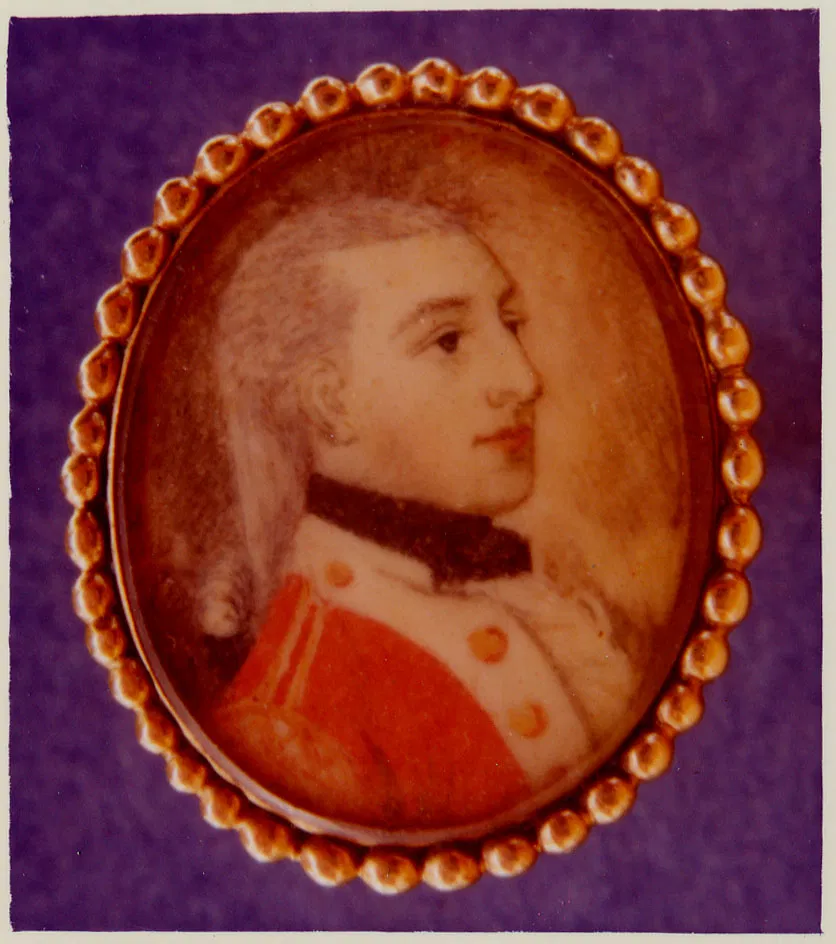
Colonel Samuel Elbert

Elbert reached East Florida with his men two days after the battle, landing on the northern end of Amelia Island. Unbeknownst to Elbert, Governor Tonyn had sent a small fleet to oppose his at the St. Marys River, but winds drove them out to sea where one ship got involved in battle with a privateer, and Elbert was able to reach Amelia Island without serious incident. He was met on May 19 by 13 of Baker's men, who reported the action. Three men who escaped captivity arrived two days later, reporting that five of their compatriots had been slain in cold blood by their Indian guards. Given this news, the threat of Tonyn's small fleet, and the fact that his boats were unable to negotiate the narrow channel between Amelia Island and the mainland, Elbert decided to abandon his invasion, and sailed for Savannah on May 26.

Brigadier General Augustine Prevost, the military commander at St. Augustine (and Mark Prevost's older brother), gave full credit to the regulars for the action. He criticized Brown's rangers and Indians for failing to chase down the remaining Patriots, and refused to pay for the expedition, writing that "the Indians had their plunder, the rangers the cattle, the Soldiers nothing but the trouble."

Brown and his men resumed raiding activities into Georgia, which led to renewed calls in Patriot circles for action. The effectiveness of Brown's raiding also prompted Governor Tonyn to lobby General William Howe for an expedition to regain British control of Georgia. In 1778 American General Robert Howe and then-president of Georgia John Houstoun planned another expedition against East Florida. This one was also hampered by command issues, and the few troops that made it to Florida were turned back at the Battle of Alligator Bridge. Savannah was captured by British forces sent from New York in December 1778, which were joined shortly after by troops from St. Augustine, reestablishing royal authority in Georgia.

The battle site is now located in Jacksonville's Thomas Creek Preserve, and is part of the Timucuan Ecological and Historic Preserve. The site itself is undeveloped; there is a highway marker on nearby U. S. Route 1 commemorating the battle.
