= Magaw =

Magaw is a surname. Notable people with the surname include:

- Alice Magaw (1860–1928), American nurse
- John Magaw (born 1935), American civil servant
- Robert Magaw (1738–1790), American lawyer, politician and soldier
- Samuel Magaw (1735–1812), American clergyman and educator

== See also ==
- Magraw
