= Sawpit Bluff, Florida =

Coordinates: 30.5196°N 81.4808°W

Sawpit Bluff was a small settlement in East Florida during the American Revolutionary War on the site of a plantation at the mouth of Sawpit Creek where it discharges into Nassau Sound opposite the south end of Amelia Island. It was the location of a proposed rendezvous between mounted militia from Sunbury, Georgia and Continental troops under the command of Lt. Col. Samuel Elbert during the second invasion of Florida in May 1777.

Around 1809, Capt. James Smith (father of Mary Martha Reid, wife of Robert R. Reid, a territorial governor of Florida) built a plantation at Sawpit Bluff, called by the Spanish Barranco de Aserradero (roughly, "Sawmill Bluff"). Plantations in Spanish Florida depended on the forced labor of enslaved persons of African descent.

The site is located at the mouth of the Nassau River in present-day Duval County, Florida.

== History ==
=== Second invasion of East Florida by Georgian "Patriots" ===
Almost immediately upon the signing of the United States Declaration of Independence on July 4, 1776, hostilities began between British loyalists in Florida and Patriots loyal to the new nation to the north. The British spent the remainder of 1776 deflecting Patriot raids from the Georgia side of the St. Marys. In the Spring of 1777, British forces pushed across the St. Marys River, capturing Fort McIntosh on the Satilla River, and raiding Georgia farms for some 2000 head of cattle.

The American response was swift: an invasion of St. Augustine was planned, and Patriot forces began moving south. Lt. Col. Samuel Elbert and 400 Continental troops were to rendezvous with Col. John Baker and his force of about 100 Georgia cavalry militia on May 12 for the march south to St. Augustine.

The expedition left Sunbury on May 1. Baker's cavalry rode overland via the King's Road while Elbert's Continentals sailed down the inland waterway with the expectation of meeting at Sawpit Bluff, near the mouth of the Nassau River at the north end of what is now Black Hammock Island. Although rivers swollen with spring floods hindered the advance of Baker's force, they crossed the St. Marys River and were able to reach Sawpit Bluff on May 12 finding that Elbert had not yet arrived. He and his men encamped there for the next three days, and made several raids on habitations between the Nassau and Trout Rivers. The flotilla, under the command of Commodore Oliver Bowen, had been delayed by contrary winds, and did not reach Amelia Island until May 18.

Having learned from a local resident that authorities had been alerted to the expedition, Baker moved west to find a more strategic location to wait, and encamped on the banks of Thomas Creek, a tributary of the Nassau River. Meanwhile, Brown's Indians and rangers had been reinforced by British regulars under the command of Major Mark Prevost, bringing their total force to about 200 men. They crossed the St. Johns and encamped at Rolfe's Sawmill on Trout Creek; their scouts located the American camp on the night of May 16–17.

Brown's rangers and Indians set up an ambush ahead of Baker's route, while Prevost's regulars advanced behind Baker. When Baker's column reached the ambush around 9:00 am, Brown's men delivered a surprise volley. Baker and his men turned to flee, directly into Prevost's oncoming regulars. The Patriots were quickly overwhelmed by the large numbers of rangers and Indians appearing in the underbrush. About half of the Georgians fled at first sight of the enemy; Baker, his horse taken by one of his companions, escaped into the swamps.

The superior British force defeated the Americans at the Battle of Thomas Creek in the southernmost battle of the American Revolutionary War, and the only one fought in present-day Duval County. Colonel Baker and forty-two of his men escaped, making their way through the marsh, and across the St. Marys River to Georgia. Elbert reached East Florida with his men two days after the battle, landing on the northern end of Amelia Island.

=== The rebellion of East Florida ===
Armed parties of the so-called "Patriots of Florida" made forays from Sawpit Bluff to Talbot Island during the Revolution of East Florida, or the so-called "Patriots' War". On August 19, 1813, Capt. Tomás Llorente sent out a detachment of thirty-two men with the Spanish gunboat Immutable, to attack rebel camps in the area. The soldiers found a group of about twenty-five rebels under the command of Francisco Roman Sanchez at William Hart's plantation, and drove them away. They also displaced a group of armed men from the house of William Fitzpatrick. The Spaniards decided that the Fitzpatrick and Smith plantations must be eradicated as refuges for the insurrectionists, and on August 28 attacked them in full strength with two gunboat that sailed up Two Sisters Creek and destroyed the Fitzpatrick house with a barrage of artillery. As those inside the building fled, a detachment of soldiers landed and apprehended Fitzpatrick. The boats then continued on to Sawpit Bluff where they shelled the house of James and Mary Smith until the occupants came out and surrendered to the Spanish.
