= Magraw =

Magraw is a surname. Notable people with the surname include:

- Dean Magraw, American guitarist and composer
- Henry S. Magraw (1815–1867), American politician
- Jacob Magraw-Mickelson (born 1982), American artist

== See also ==
- Magaw
