= HMS Viper (1779) =

History

South Carolina
- Name: Rutledge
- Captured: 4 November 1779

United Kingdom
- Name: HMS Viper
- Acquired: 4 November 1779 by capture
- Fate: Broken up in 1785

General characteristics
- Type: Galley
- Tons burthen: 113 (bm; British), est. from measurements below
- Length: est. 65 ft (20 m) (between perpendiculars)
- Beam: est. 20 ft (6.1 m)
- Propulsion: oars and sails
- Complement: 39 (including 20 black oarsmen)
- Armament: 2 × 24-pounder guns in the bow + 4 × 6-pounder guns amidships at capture; possibly swivel guns as well
- Notes: Rutledge had been converted to a galley from a large flat boat.

HMS Viper was a 6-gun galley, the former South Carolina Navy's Rutledge, which the British captured on 4 November 1779 at Tybee. She was broken up in 1785.

== Capture ==
Captain Henry, of Fowey, and his squadron captured Rutledge and recaptured their victualing ship Myrtle, which the French had captured and turned into a water ship. Myrtle and Rutledge had been blown out to sea a few days earlier. They returned to Tybee, not realising that it was now in British hands, and were captured. Henry renamed Rutledge Viper, and gave her a crew under the command of Mr. John Steel (or Steele), Master's Mate of Rose.

== Service ==
Curiously, a number of sources list the galley Viper among the vessels under the command of Captain John Henry when the French fleet under the Comte d'Estaing besieged Savannah in September–October 1779.

The Royal Navy commissioned Viper on 18 November 1779 under the command of Lieutenant Charles Wroughton.

"HM Armed Galley Viper", Acting Lieutenant Thomas Chambers, was among the vessels at the Siege of Charleston, 28 March to 12 May 1780. She then was listed in 1781 as being with Admiral Parker at Jamaica and under the command of W. Bowman. For the next two years she is listed as being under the command of W.R. Dunlop and part of the North America squadron under Rear-Admiral of the Red Robert Rigby.

== Fate ==
Viper was paid-off in May 1784. She was broken up in 1785.
