= Georgia Line =

US Revolutionary War formation

The Georgia Line was a military formation within the Continental Army during the American Revolutionary War. The term "Georgia Line" referred to the quota of one infantry regiment which was assigned to Georgia at various times by the Continental Congress. The term also included the three infantry regiments in excess of Georgia's quota that were raised outside the state. These, together with similar contingents from the other twelve states, formed the Continental Line. The concept was particularly important for the promotion of commissioned officers. Officers of the Continental Army below the rank of brigadier general were ordinarily ineligible for promotion except in the line of their own state.

== Composition ==
On November 4, 1775, the Continental Congress created the "second establishment" of the Continental Army, which served in the campaign of 1776. On the same day, Congress also voted to maintain two infantry battalions in South Carolina and one infantry battalion in Georgia. The units which formed part of the Georgia line were:

- Georgia Regiment of Horse Rangers (1776–1780 (captured in Charleston, disbanded 1781))
- Georgia Regiment (1775–1776)
  - 1st Georgia Regiment (1776–1780, captured in Charleston)
    - Georgia Regiment (1781–1783)
    - Georgia Battalion (1783)
- 2nd Georgia Regiment (1776–1780, captured in Charleston, disbanded 1781)
- 3rd Georgia Regiment (1776–1780, captured in Charleston, disbanded 1781)
- 4th Georgia Regiment (1777–1780, captured in Charleston, disbanded 1781)

When more than two of the line infantry regiments above were grouped, they formed part of what became known as the Georgia Brigade. This brigade was only used a select few times, as most regiments were captured during the Siege of Charleston.

== See also ==
- 1st Brigade Georgia Militia
- List of United States militia units in the American Revolutionary War
