= Samuel Elbert =

American merchant, military officer and politician (1740–1788)

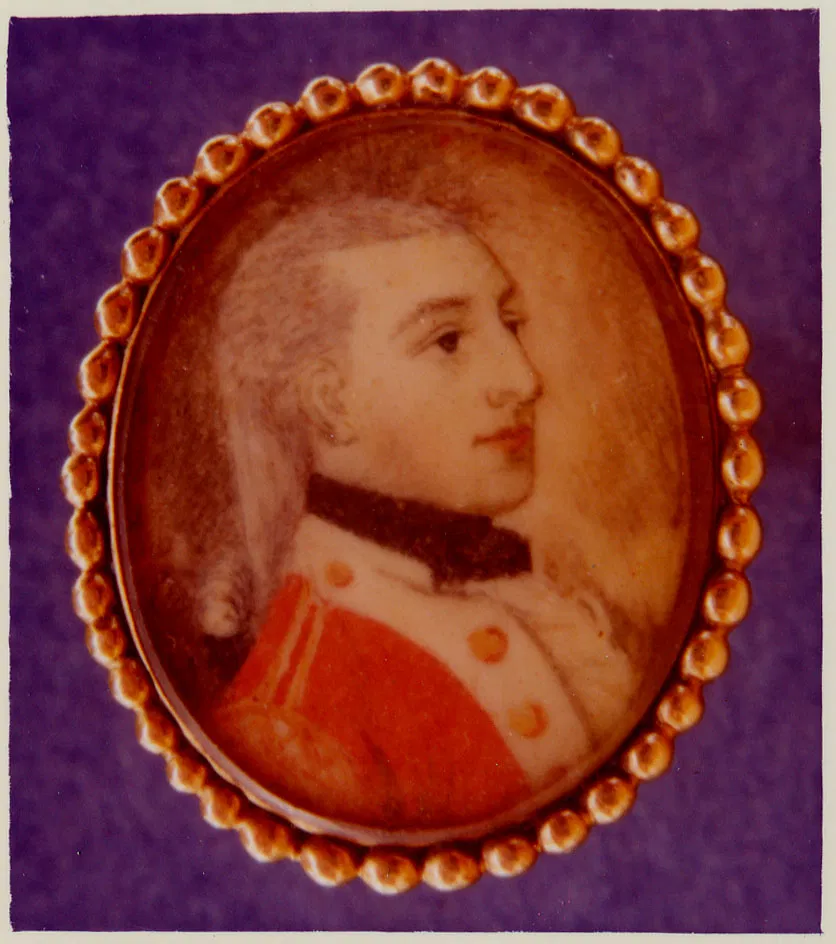
- Born: 1740; Savannah, Georgia, British America
- Died: November 1, 1788 (aged 47–48)
- Military career
- Allegiance: United States
- Branch: Georgia State Navy; Continental Army
- Rank: Major general (Georgia Militia); Brigadier general (Continental Army)
- Conflicts: American Revolutionary War; Battle of Brier Creek; Frederica naval action; Siege of Yorktown
- Awards: Society of the Cincinnati
- Other work: Governor of Georgia

Samuel Elbert (1740 – November 1, 1788) was an American merchant, military officer and politician from Savannah, Georgia. During the Revolutionary War, Elbert rose to the rank of major general in the Georgia militia and colonel in the Continental Army, commanding the victorious colonial forces in a naval battle near St. Simons Island, Georgia on April 19, 1778. He was wounded and captured at the Battle of Brier Creek the following year, though he regained his freedom in a prisoner exchange. He was brevetted a brigadier general after the end of the war.

Elbert was an original member of the Society of the Cincinnati of the State of Georgia and a Freemason. His name appears on the 1779 Masonic membership roles of Solomon's Lodge No. 1 at Savannah, along with James Jackson, Governor John A. Treutlen, and Archibald Bulloch. Elbert also served as the last Provincial Grand Master of the first English Provincial Grand Lodge of Georgia in 1785. In 1784, he was elected to the United States Congress, but declined to serve because he did not consider himself physically fit for the task. He later served a term as the governor of Georgia.

== Early life ==
Born on November 1, 1740 in Savannah, Province of Georgia, Samuel Elbert was the son of Baptist minister William Elbert and his wife, Sarah Greenfield. Elbert’s parents died in South Carolina when he was fourteen, after which he traveled back to Savannah.

Elizabeth Rae

Elbert was later employed by a prosperous planter named John Rae, an important man in both commerce and government. Rae had built a beautiful home on his land near Savannah known as Rae’s Hall. It was through Rae's influence that Elbert was commissioned to go into the Indian country as a trader. He had great success in his dealings with the Indians, mostly because of his kind regard for them. On one occasion, Elbert was called upon to escort and protect a party of Indians who had come to Savannah in an effort to redress a great wrong – the murder of a Creek chief called Mad Turkey by Thomas Fee. The incident turned into a local controversy, and in 1774, feelings ran high between the whites and the Indians. Fee was convicted and jailed. In 1785, Elbert wrote in a letter to George Walton, "It is a pity that the people on our Frontiers will behave so cruelly toward those poor savages; not contented with having the lands, but to rob, beat and abuse them likewise is enough to bring down Divine vengeance on their heads."

Elbert became engaged to Rae's daughter Elizabeth and in 1769 they were married at Rae’s Hall, a union which, according to historian Charles C. Jones, "confirmed Elbert’s social position and influence."

Elbert became a captain of a grenadier company of Savannah’s First Regiment of Militia in June 1772 and signed a pledge of allegiance to King George III as a prerequisite to being commissioned as an officer.

== American Revolutionary War ==
On the outbreak of the Revolutionary War, Elbert became active in the Provisional Congress of Georgia and its outgrowth, the Georgia Council of Safety. At the suggestion of a committee of the Council of Safety, the companies of the Georgia Militia decided to elect their own officers. As a result, all officers loyal to the king were replaced with staunch supporters of the oppositionist cause. On February 4, 1776, Elbert was made a lieutenant colonel and later a colonel in the Georgia Militia. "Samuel Elbert contributed as much as any other man to the early movement for Georgia’s independence", according to researcher C. E. Purcell.

In 1777, Georgia’s president, Button Gwinnett, decided to launch an invasion of Florida to capture it from the British. His plan was to send Colonel Samuel Elbert with 400 Continental Army troops in three galleys and support craft by sea and another element of 109 mounted militia led by Colonel John Baker by land. The two elements were to rendezvous at Saw Pit Bluff, near the mouth of the Nassau River, a site that is presently within the city limits of Jacksonville, Florida.

At about the time this expedition was initiated, an ongoing feud between Gwinnett and the commander of Georgia’s Continental troops, General Lachlan McIntosh, resulted in a duel in which both parties were wounded. Gwinnett died of blood poisoning three days later on May 19, 1777.

Nevertheless, one reason Florida never became a part of Georgia might be found in the vagaries of the wind. May 13, 1777 was the date picked for Elbert and Baker to combine their forces and drive back the British. Many problems prevented Elbert’s sea expedition from reaching its destination on time. While on the boats, the men were stricken with disease which, combined with supply problems and head winds, slowed their progress considerably. In addition, the internal waters in this area are relatively low in the spring, making navigation somewhat difficult. On May 30, Elbert wrote in a letter to his brother-in-law, Colonel Joseph Habersham, "could we have got the Galleys into St. John’s river, I would, with the men I have with me, made the whole province of East Florida tumble."

Colonel Baker’s mounted militia arrived at Saw Pitt Bluff as planned, but quickly moved to a new location when it became apparent that the British already knew of their intentions. During this move, Baker’s men were surprised by a British-Muscogee force of some 250 men, and a brief battle ensued in the vicinity of Thomas Creek, just south of where it empties into the Nassau River. Outnumbered and facing withering fire, most of Baker’s men deserted. Baker, together with his few remaining forces, was obliged to retreat, returning to Georgia on May 17.

It was about three days later that Elbert disembarked his troops on the north end of Amelia Island. His forces were joined by a few stragglers from Baker’s force, but after reconnoitering, Elbert found the British well entrenched with troops and artillery. While Elbert’s little band was busy trying to cut through the Amelia Narrows, the British commander, Patrick Tonyn, was making plans to attack them with vastly superior forces.

To ensure total victory, the British warships HMS Rebecca and HMS Hawke were ordered out to block any attempt of Elbert’s little flotilla to escape. A violent storm came up, and Rebecca and Hawke were forced out to sea. Before they could return, they encountered a rebel brigantine of sixteen guns. The ensuing battle damaged the Rebecca so badly that it could no longer carry on, allowing Elbert to leave Amelia Island unopposed.

Failing to surprise the British and without the support of Baker’s detachment, Elbert and his men returned to Georgia without much having been accomplished. Shortly thereafter, Elbert concluded in a letter to General McIntosh:

I think --- that little can be done, unless by a formidable invasion, which I judge to be rather too much for Georgia to undertake till her forces are put on a more respectable footing, and therefore recommend confining our operations entirely to the defensive till a more favorable opportunity. We have too many secret enemies amongst us who keep up a regular correspondence with our Florida neighbors, and until they are put to a stop it will be impossible for us to enter Florida without their having timely notice of our approach.

A later attempt to invade Florida with a much larger army was initiated by Governor John Houstoun and General Robert Howe in 1778. It was doomed to failure from the start by lack of a unified command. One of the few successes of this second invasion attempt came when Elbert put 300 of his troops aboard three galleys and captured three small Royal Navy ships: the schooner HMS Hinchinbrook, the recently repaired sloop Rebecca, and a third vessel referred to as a prize brig, all of which were anchored along the Frederica River. These ships had been harassing the Georgia rebels for almost two years. Prevailing conditions favored Elbert’s flotilla and it was not long before the three ships were abandoned and captured. Having suffered no casualties, Elbert was ecstatic.

Elbert's three galleys comprised a good part of the Georgia State Navy at that time. These vessels were the Lee, the Washington and the Bulloch. The Continental Congress also authorized a fourth galley for the state, which was named the Congress. The galleys were approximately 70 feet (21 m) in length and were powered by two lateen sails as well as oars and had a very large cannon mounted in the bow. Although not suited for oceangoing, their maneuverability made them formidable in the shallow coastal waters of Georgia.

The remarkable success of this enterprise encouraged Elbert to consider launching an attack against another heavily armed British vessel, the Galatea, anchored at the north end of Jekyll Island. Apparently he decided against it, and the Galatea, unable to complete its mission, set sail for St. Augustine, Florida a few days later. General Howe commended Elbert and his troops for their capture of the three British ships and, partly because of this venture, decided to continue with the invasion of Florida.

Meanwhile, Elbert continued with his Continental troops toward Florida. Just after they crossed the Satilla River, on June 24, the first solar eclipse recorded in the British colonies occurred. It was called "the dark day" by the troops and may well have been responsible for some of the desertions about then.

Elbert, now joined by General Howe, continued on and occupied Fort Tonyn, which had been abandoned by the British. It was here that problems began to arise. Houstoun and Howe were unable to agree on who would lead the continentals in the invasion and the rebel naval commander, Commodore Oliver Bowen, refused to subordinate himself to the Army. This, along with the lack of surprise and widespread illness among the troops, caused the invaders to be halted in a battle at a place called Alligator Creek Bridge. General Howe announced that "our principal objective has been accomplished" and returned his troops to Georgia. Although skirmishes between the Patriots and the Loyalists continued, the 1778 expedition was the last of Georgia’s attempts to capture Florida from the British.

In December 1778, the British sent a fleet with about 3,500 troops led by Colonel Archibald Campbell to retake Savannah. General Howe, in command of the city, declined to accept an offer from Colonel Elbert to use Elbert’s regiment to defend a landing place known as Girardeau’s plantation (32.07°N 81.04°W). As a result, the British were able to land unopposed and soon were able to attack the American army from the rear by traversing a swamp under the guidance of a Black slave. The Americans were soon forced to retreat across the bridge over Musgrove Creek. Although most of the army crossed safely, the British seized the bridge just before Elbert’s command arrived. As a result, Elbert and his men were forced to swim the icy creek to avoid capture. They later joined General Howe about eight miles (13 km) above Savannah.

=== Battle of Brier Creek ===
General Howe later faced a court-martial for abandoning not only Savannah but giving up all of Georgia. The defense of Georgia continued with the troops that had not fled to the Carolinas. Among those was Samuel Elbert who, with his remaining troops, briefly occupied Augusta, then deployed to the Brier Creek area, where they continually harassed Campbell’s army as it marched toward Augusta. The weather was cold and conditions harsh. On January 29, 1779, Elbert wrote in a letter to General Benjamin Lincoln, commander of the Southern army:

The articles of provisions we shall have plenty, of artillery we have none, small arms very ordinary in general and scarce, many men have come to camp without any, which we have not to give them. Entrenching tools and camp utensils are not to be had here.

In late February, Elbert was joined by General John Ashe and about 1,800 additional troops. Ashe deployed most of his troops on high ground near Brier Creek. It was here that Elbert nearly lost his life.

Although Elbert was a brigadier general in the Georgia Militia, he was still a colonel in the Continental Army at this time and was in command of one of three divisions under General Ashe. On March 3, 1779, the British launched a surprise attack and quickly routed Ashe’s main army. Ashe disappeared into the woods, ostensibly to rally his scattered troops. The remaining left wing, under General Elbert, was driven back against Brier Creek. With Brier Creek behind him and surrounded on all other sides by the enemy, Elbert and Lieutenant Colonel John McIntosh together with 60 Continentals and 150 Georgia militiamen made a heroic effort to turn the fortune of battle without any help from the other two divisions. In the words of the Georgia Historical Commission, Elbert’s small regiment "made one of the most gallant stands against overwhelming odds of the Revolutionary War." The British were forced to bring up their reserves and, with all hope of escape or victory gone, Elbert surrendered the remnants of his command. More than half of the 150 men killed were Elbert's men. Elbert himself was about to be bayoneted when he was recognized as a Mason by a British officer who ordered his life spared.

There is ample reason to believe that, if the other two divisions had fought with the tenacity of Elbert’s command, things might have turned out differently, especially since General Andrew Williamson was on his way with 1,200 men and General Griffith Rutherford was coming with 800 men to reinforce the army at Brier Creek. As it was, General Lincoln’s plan to win control of the South and bring the war to an end resulted in disaster. General Ashe was later accused of cowardice for leaving the field of battle while Elbert was still engaged, but since nothing could be proved, a court of inquiry found Ashe only guilty of gross neglect.

Elbert remained a prisoner on parole in the British camp for more than a year. During this time, he was accorded great respect and kindness. The British made several efforts to convert his allegiance, offering promotion, honors and other rewards, but he remained loyal to the American cause. Elbert was given considerable freedom while being held prisoner, which was unusual given the typically harsh treatment of prisoners at the time. It is a family tradition, however, that this freedom exposed him to a plot upon his life. The plot was attributed to a gang of Tories who had every reason to dislike Elbert since he had been very active against them. Their plan was to have him killed by Indians. While strolling in the woods one day, Elbert encountered two Indians with guns aimed directly at him. He had always extended great kindness to the Indians whenever he had had dealings with them in the past. He made a secret signal to them, and they recognized him as a friend.

=== End of the war ===
The Patriot movement at Augusta petitioned the Continental Congress to offer the return of captured Brigadier General James Inglis Hamilton in exchange for Elbert, and to arrange for Elbert's promotion to the rank of brigadier general in the Continental Army. This request was granted after the capture of Charleston by the British in 1780.

Elbert went immediately to George Washington's headquarters in the north. Washington was elated to accept Elbert's services, and at the Siege of Yorktown in 1781, Elbert was given command of a brigade. While at Yorktown, he made a lasting friendship with a young French general, the Marquis de Lafayette. This friendship continued after the war's end, and these two men maintained a friendly correspondence for many years. Such was Elbert's admiration for Lafayette that he named one of his sons after him.

In 1782, the General Assembly of Georgia chose Elbert, General Lachlan McIntosh, Edward Telfair and a number of other prominent Georgians to serve as commissioners at a conference with the Creek and Cherokee Indians regarding their title to certain Georgia lands. A meeting took place at Augusta in May 1783. In a May 31 treaty, the Cherokee ceded a tract between the Tugaloo and Oconee Rivers. According to Hugh McCall's The History of Georgia, Before the conference had ended, news reached Georgia that a peace treaty had been concluded between Great Britain and her former colonies.

== Post-war activities ==
Many honors were bestowed upon Samuel Elbert. He was elected Sheriff of Chatham County and chosen vestryman for Christ Church, the first church in the new nation to organize a Sunday school. In 1784, he was selected as one of five delegates from the Society of the Cincinnati, an organization comprising officers who had fought in the Revolution. The same year, he was elected to the General Assembly of Georgia to be a delegate to the United States Congress. This latter honor he was forced to refuse, because he felt, after the long rigors of war, his physical condition was not at its best.

=== Governor of Georgia ===
When the General Assembly of Georgia convened at Savannah on January 4, 1785, Samuel Elbert was elected governor of the state, to succeed John Houstoun. Elbert had not sought this honor and he asked for time to give the matter his earnest consideration. On January 7, 1785, Elbert appeared before the Georgia House of Representatives and formally accepted the honor, saying in part:

I shall ever be sensible of the honor you have conferred on me, in appointing me Chief Magistrate of the State of Georgia. It must, in the highest degree, be flattering to me, that my conduct as a soldier through our last glorious struggle, has met the approbation of my Country; and rest assured that it will be my study as a citizen to merit the confidence you have reposed in me. I firmly rely on the concurrence and support of your Honorable House in every measure that will secure the citizens in their just rights and privileges and which may be conducive to the welfare of the State.

In January 1785, an unusual piece of legislation was passed by the General Assembly for the regular establishment and support of religion in Georgia, mixing church and state matters. Though governors at that time had no power to vote, Elbert and succeeding governors who found the legislation untenable ignored it, as stated in the Digest of the Laws of Georgia.

As governor, Elbert was intensely interested in educational and cultural matters. Along with another prominent advocate of education, Abraham Baldwin, Elbert persuaded the Georgia House to pass a bill supporting the "full and complete establishment of Public seminaries of learning". On January 27, 1785, the House granted a charter to Franklin College, later to become the University of Georgia, and Baldwin became the university's first president. Georgia thus became the first state to charter a state-supported university. More than a century later, the Savannah Morning News reflected that this event was "... perhaps of more enduring and far-reaching importance and good than any other of this great man's notable career."

The matter of taxation came before Elbert early in April 1785, when William Houston, Georgia's delegate to the United States Congress, wrote a letter informing him that New York and Georgia were the only states that had not conceded the right to levy these taxes – that feeling against Georgia in the national capital of New York City at the time was very high, even going so far as to threaten to vote Georgia out of the Union. Undoubtedly, Elbert favored full cooperation with Congress, but governors of that time did not wield the power that executives of later years were to possess, and Georgia did not accept the tax.

== Personal life ==
Elbert and Elizabeth Rae had six children: Catherine, Elizabeth, Sara, Samuel de Lafayette, Matthew and Hugh Lee. That he was a kind and greatly beloved father to his children is evidenced in many records.

On November 6, 1788, the following obituary appeared in the Georgia Gazette, published in Savannah:

Died last Saturday, after a lingering sickness, age 48 years, SAMUEL ELBERT, Esq. Major General of the Militia of this state, Vice president of the Society of the Cincinnati, and Sheriff of the County of Chatham. His death was announced by the discharge of minute guns and the colours of Fort Wayne, and vessels in the harbour being displayed at half mast high. An early and warm attachment to the cause of his country stimulated him to exert those natural talents he possessed for a military life, throughout the late glorious and successful contest, with ability and general approbation, for which he was promoted to the rank of Brigadier General in the Army of the United States. In the year 1785, his country chose him, by their general suffrage, Governor and Commander in chief of the State, which office he executed with fidelity and discharged its various duties with becoming attention and dignity. The appointments of Major General of the Militia and Sheriff of this county, were further marks of the confidence of his country, whose interests he had always at heart, and whose appointments he received and executed, with a grateful remembrance that his conduct through life had met the approbation of fellow citizens. In private life, he was among the first to promote useful and benevolent societies. As a Christian, he bore his painful illness with patience and firmness, and looked forward to his great change with an awful and fixed hope of future happiness. As a most affectionate husband and parent his widow and six children have great cause to lament his end, and the society in general to regret the loss of a valuable member. His remains were attended to on Sunday to Christ Church by the ancient society of the Masons, (of which he was the Passed (sic) Grand Master in this state) with the members of the Cincinnati as mourners, accompanied by a great number of his other fellow citizens, whom the Rev. Mr. Lindsay addressed in a short but well adapted discourse on the solemn occasion. Minute guns were fired during the funeral, and every other honor was paid his memory, by a respectable military procession, composed of the Artillery and other Militia Companies. The body was afterwards deposited at the family burial place on the Mount at Rae’s Hall.

== Honors ==
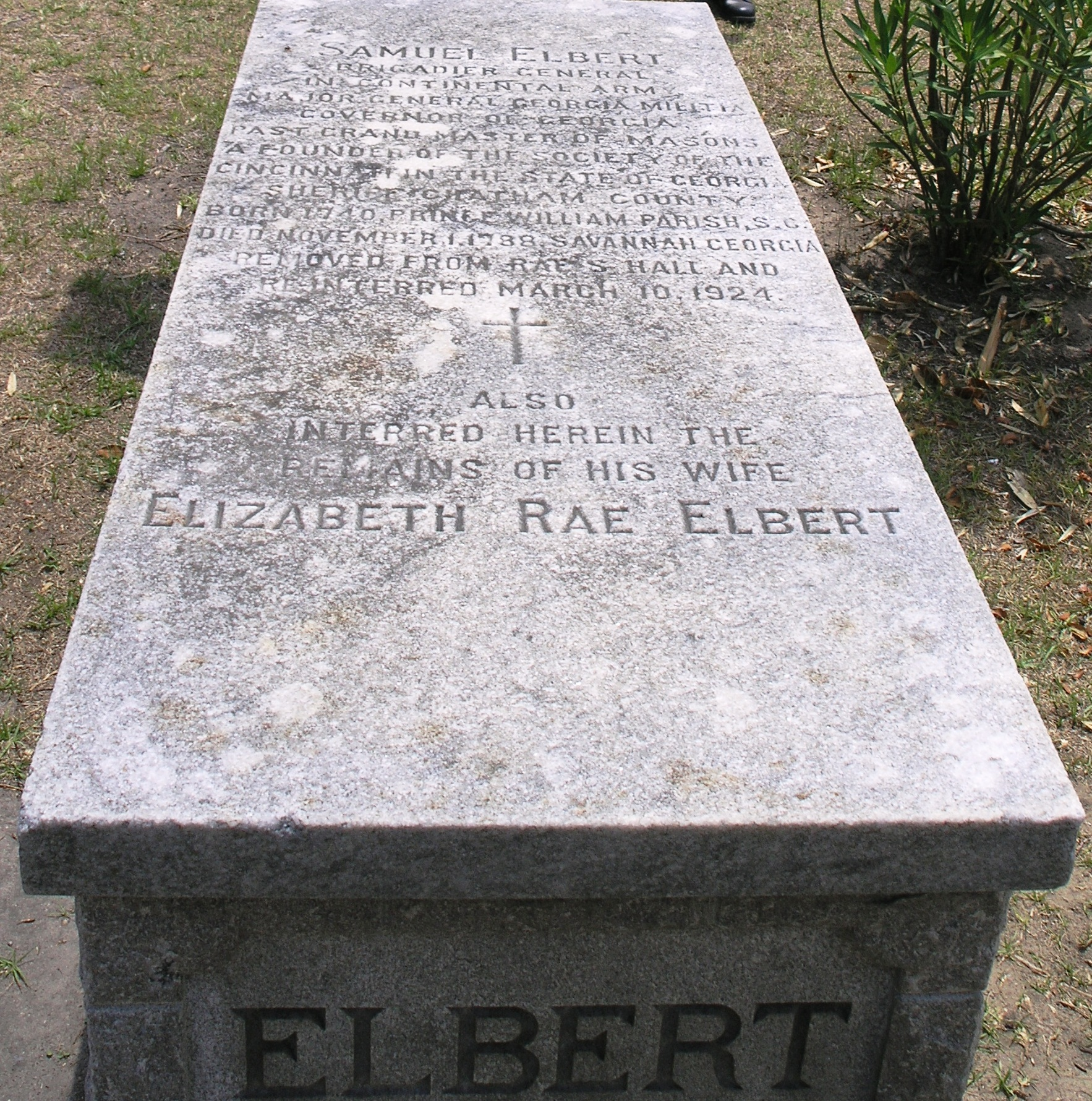
Grave of Samuel Elbert in Colonial Cemetery in Savannah, Georgia

Much of the credit for awakening interest in Georgia's Revolutionary heroes is due to the efforts of William Harden, former long-time librarian of the Georgia Historical Society at Savannah. His interest inspired the Sons of the American Revolution to appoint a committee to locate Samuel Elbert's grave. The grave site was eventually found on an Indian mound overlooking the Savannah River. In a letter to the editor of the Atlanta Journal & Constitution dated May 9, 1971, John L. Sutlive, former editor of the Savannah Evening Press, stated the discovery of Elbert's grave was somewhat accidental. Working on the Rae plantation many years ago, workmen uncovered some bones thought to be those of an Indian, but the fact that there were some military buttons with the skeleton came to the attention of General Robert J. Travis, who rescued them, realizing that they were the remains of Governor Elbert. He kept them in a crate under his desk until reburial arrangements could be made.

On March 24, 1924, Samuel and Elizabeth Rae Elbert were re-interred in Colonial Park Cemetery in Savannah. Once again, honors were paid to this man in a military funeral by units from the Army, Navy and National Guard.

Elbert County and the town of Elberton were named for him. There is also an Elbert Ward and an Elbert memorial in Savannah. In 1971 a private school named the Samuel Elbert Academy was chartered in Elberton, Georgia. Many markers honoring Samuel Elbert have been set up by the Daughters and Sons of the American Revolution, the Society of Masons and the Georgia Historical Commission.

Political offices
Preceded by John Houstoun	Governor of Georgia; 1785–1786	Succeeded by Edward Telfair
