= 4th Georgia Regiment =

- Active: 1777–1781
- Allegiance: (United States) Continental Congress
- Type: Infantry
- Size: 8 companies
- Part of: Georgia Line
- Engagements: Siege of Savannah (1779); Siege of Charleston (1780)

Commanders
- Notable commanders: Colonel John White

The 4th Georgia Regiment was an American infantry unit raised for service with the Continental Army in the American Revolutionary War. The regiment was formed in February 1777 at Philadelphia, Pennsylvania from British deserters and Colonel John White was appointed its commander. The unit soon acquired a bad reputation for plundering the area in which it camped and was moved far from Philadelphia. In December 1777 it was assigned to the Georgia Brigade and took part in operations in Florida in 1778. It fought at Savannah in 1779 and was captured by the British at Charleston in May 1780.

== History ==
The 4th Georgia Regiment was authorized for service with the Continental Army by the Continental Congress on 1 February 1777. The unit was assigned to the Southern Department. The regiment organized in a strength of eight companies at Philadelphia, Pennsylvania during the summer and fall of 1777. The unit was recruited from British deserters. In early August one of its soldiers was murdered in Philadelphia and the authorities moved the regiment into camp west of the city along the Lancaster Road. Immediately, the people of Lower Merion Township began to complain of marauding by the soldiers. They reported that the troops robbed travelers, broke into houses, burned fences, chopped down trees, stole things, and killed livestock. When confronted, the soldiers threatened the inhabitants with violence. The regiment was ordered to Lancaster, Pennsylvania where the problems continued. Some soldiers robbed Colonel White of his money, his papers, and his officer's commission. They were caught and sentenced to death, but the colonel's wife asked for clemency and the men received 300 lashes instead.

On 23 December 1777, the 4th Georgia was assigned to the Georgia Brigade. In 1778, the regiment participated in the unsuccessful Florida Campaign and in the loss of Savannah. In 1779 the unit fought at the Siege of Savannah. At the Siege of Charleston the regiment was captured by the British army along with the rest of the American southern army at Charleston, South Carolina on 12 May 1780. The 4th Georgia was officially disbanded on 1 January 1781.

== Service record ==
Designation	Date	Brigade	Department
4th Georgia Regiment	1 February 1777	none	Southern
4th Georgia Regiment	23 December 1777	Georgia	Southern
4th Georgia Regiment	12 May 1780	Georgia	captured
4th Georgia Regiment	1 January 1781	none	disbanded
