= John Baker (American Revolutionary War) =

American militia leader (1722–1792)

- Born: 1722
- Died: 1792 (aged 69–70); Liberty County, Georgia, U.S.
- Spouse: Sarah Baker
- Military career
- Allegiance: United States
- Branch: Georgia Militia
- Rank: Colonel
- Conflicts: American Revolutionary War: Battle of Thomas Creek

John Baker (1722–1792) was a militia leader during the American Revolutionary War. Most notably he led the American militia in the Battle of Thomas Creek on May 17, 1777 against the British army of 250. Baker County, Georgia, was named after him.

Baker was of the noted Dorchester Colony of Puritans who found home in St. John's Parish. He was a member of the Provincial Congress formed at Tondee's Tavern in Savannah, Province of Georgia, on July 4, 1775.
