= Robert Magaw =

American politician and lawyer (1738–1790)

- Born: 1738; Philadelphia, Pennsylvania, British America
- Died: January 7, 1790 (aged 51–52) Carlisle, Pennsylvania, U.S.
- Allegiance: United States
- Branch: Pennsylvania militia Continental Army
- Rank: Colonel
- Commands: 5th Pennsylvania Battalion
- Conflicts: American Revolutionary War: Battle of Fort Washington (surrendered)
- Spouse: Marritje Van Brunt

Robert Magaw (1738 – January 7, 1790) was an American politician and lawyer from Carlisle, Pennsylvania, who served as a colonel in the Continental Army during the U.S. Revolutionary War.

== Early life and education ==
Robert was born in Philadelphia, Pennsylvania, in 1738. His parents, William and Elizabeth Magaw, had earlier immigrated from Strabane, County Tyrone, Ireland, to the eastern shore of Maryland. He later settled in Carlisle, Pennsylvania, and practiced law there. His brother was the Rev. Samuel Magaw.

== Career ==
Magaw served several years in the militia, and when the war broke out he was made a colonel in command of the 5th Pennsylvania Battalion.

During the New York campaign he was in command of the U.S. garrison at Fort Washington. He was forced to surrender it, and became a prisoner on November 16, 1776. Based on his parole he was set at liberty in New York City, but could not leave the city until he was exchanged. This did not happen until October 1780.

== Personal life ==
While a prisoner on parole, Magaw met and courted Marritje Van Brunt (1762–1803) of Kings County, New York. They married in April 1779, and would later have two children.

== Later life and death ==
After he was exchanged, he returned home to New Carlisle and continued his law practice. He served two years in the Pennsylvania House of Representatives (1781–1782) and was for many years a trustee of Dickinson College. He died at home in Carlisle on January 7, 1790. After his death, Marritje returned to New York to live with their son, Robert Van Brunt Magaw, at Gravesend.
