= 2nd Georgia Regiment =

- Active: 1776–1781
- Country: (United States) United Colonies of America
- Allegiance: Continental Congress of the United States
- Branch: (United States Army) Continental Army
- Type: Line Infantry
- Size: Regiment
- Part of: Southern Department
- Garrison/HQ: Williamsburg, Virginia (raised)
- Nickname: "Second Georgia"
- Engagements: First Florida Expedition; Second Florida Expedition; Siege of Savannah; Siege of Charleston

Commanders
- Notable commanders: Colonel Samuel Elbert

The 2nd Georgia Regiment, or as it was also known, the 2nd Georgia, was a regiment of the Continental Army, which formed part of the Georgia Line. Due to bad recruitment and horrible discipline, the 2nd-4th Georgia regiments were all later disbanded, and personnel joined the (1st) Georgia Regiment.

== History ==
On 5 July 1776, as part of the 1776 quotas, the 2nd Georgia Regiment was formed as part of the Continental Army and subsequently assigned to the Southern Department. The regiment was organised in the fall and winter of 1776 in Williamsburg, Virginia, consisting of eight companies, and recruited primarily in Virginia. On 23 December 1777 the regiment was assigned to the new formed Georgia Brigade which contained the 1st-3rd Georgian regiments, an element in the Southern Department.

By March 1780, the regiment moved into the Charleston, South Carolina garrison, and captured there by the British Southern Army on 12 May 1780. The regiment was officially disbanded following the 1781 quotas on 1 January 1781, and personnel joined the Georgia Regiment.

There is very little information on the uniform of the regiment, but the norm seems to have been hunting shirts and gaiter trousers.

== Engagements ==
Engagements which the regiment took part in were:

- First Florida Expedition (1776)
- Second Florida Expedition (1778)
- Siege of Savannah (1779)
- Siege of Charleston (1780)

== Commanding Officers ==
Commanding officers of the regiment were:

- 5 July 1778–????, Colonel Samuel Elbert
