= Samuel Magaw =

American religious figure (1735–1812)

Samuel Magaw (1735 – December 1, 1812) was a clergyman and educator from Pennsylvania. He was a member of the American Philosophical Society in 1784 and served as Vice Provost of the University of Pennsylvania (1782–1791).

== Formative years ==
Born in Pennsylvania in 1735 Samuel Magaw was a son of William Magaw of Shippensburg. His brothers were Dr. William Magaw and Colonel Robert Magaw, a colonel in the American Revolutionary War.

A member of first class graduated from the College of Philadelphia in 1757, when he received the bachelor's degree, Samuel McGaw then received his master's degree in 1760. Educated for a tutorship at the suggestion of the authorities at the same college, he also later studied divinity.

He was married to married Lucia Doz, a daughter of Andrew Doz, of Philadelphia.

== Religious life ==
In 1767, Magaw traveled to England for orders and ordained as an Anglican priest. Upon his return to the United States, he became a missionary of the Society for Propagation of the Gospel at Dover and Duck Creek, Delaware. Appointed Rector of St. Paul's Church in Philadelphia in 1781, he held that office until 1804.

In 1783, Magaw was awarded an honorary Doctor of Divinity degree from the University of Pennsylvania. Vice-provost and professor of moral philosophy at the university from 1782 to 1791, he voluntarily withdrew from that role in 1791, after the college and university had merged, in order to enable his friend, Dr. John Andrews, to be elected in his place.

Magaw then assisted Rev. James Abercrombie, D.D. in founding the Academy of the Protestant Episcopal Church in Philadelphia, and was elected a member of the American Philosophical Society in 1784. Numerous sermons that he preached on special occasions during this time were published, and have since been reprinted. Bishop White, in his memoirs of the said church, makes complimentary mention of the part Dr. Magaw had taken in 1784 in the organization of the Protestant Episcopal Church in the United States.

In 1802, Dr. Magaw was elected president of the Schuylkill & Susquehanna Navigation Company, replacing James C. Fisher who had resigned.
