= 1st Georgia Regiment =

Georgia Regiment 1st Georgia Regiment Georgia Battalion
- Active: 1775–1780; 1781–1783
- Country: (United States) United Colonies of America
- Allegiance: Continental Congress of the United States
- Branch: (United States Army) Continental Army
- Type: Line Infantry
- Size: Regiment
- Part of: Southern Department
- Garrison/HQ: Savannah, Georgia; Charleston, South Carolina
- Nickname: "First Georgia"
- Engagements: American Revolutionary War; First Florida Expedition; Second Florida Expedition; Siege of Savannah; Siege of Charleston

Commanders
- Notable commanders: Lachlan McIntosh

The 1st Georgia Regiment, or as it was also known, the 1st Georgia was a regiment of the Continental Army, and formed part of the Georgia Line.

== History ==
=== Formation ===
On 4 November 1775, the Georgia Regiment was authorized in the Continental Army, and organized from 20 January–28 April 1776 at Savannah, Georgia, consisting of eight companies (the 8th being a rifle company). The regiment was tasked with guarding the Georgia–Florida border against incursions by Loyalists and their native allies. In early 1776, the regiment joined the Southern Department/Army. On 5 July 1776, the unit was redesignated as the 1st Georgia Regiment in light of the formation of the 2nd Georgia and 3rd Georgia Regiments. On 23 December 1777, the unit was assigned to the Georgia Brigade, an element of the Southern Department.

In 1777, the regiment was still short of men, mostly in-part due to Georgia being sparsely populated, and the colonel reported that only 10 riflemen of the rifle company had been found, and needed additional soldiers soon.

The city of St. Augustine was at the time controlled by the British and functioned as an operations base. St. Augustine was the objective of three expeditions to East Florida in which the 1st Georgia Regiment participated led under Colonel McIntosh. Each of these missions were deemed a failure caused by various issues, such as a lack of leadership and organizational abilities of the revolutionary government. When not engaged in battles or expeditions the First Georgia Regiment was defensively stationed around the frontier of the state.

=== Capture and reorganization ===
The regiment was captured by the British Army on 12 May 1780 in Charleston, South Carolina during the Siege of Charleston. By this time, the unit consisted of six officers without men, suffering losses through desertion, disease, and combat.

Redesignated 1 January 1781 as the Georgia Regiment once again. Reorganized and redesignated 1 January 1783 as the Georgia Battalion, and consisted of three companies, along with two troops of cavalry. Furloughed in summer 1783 at Charleston, South Carolina, and disbanded 15 November 1783.

There is very little information on the uniform of the regiment, but the norm seems to have been hunting shirts and gaiter trousers. The regiment was also notably undersupplied and undertrained.

== Engagements ==
Engagements which the regiment took part in were:

- First Florida Expedition (1776)
- Second Florida Expedition (1777)
- Third Florida Expedition (1778)
- Siege of Savannah (1779)
- Siege of Charleston (1780)

== Commanding Officers ==
Commanding officers of the regiment were:

- January 7, 1776–16 September 1776, Colonel Lachlan McIntosh
- 16 September 1776 – 21 March 1778, Colonel Joseph Habersham
- 21 March 1778–????, Colonel Robert Rae
