= 6th Pennsylvania Regiment =

Infantry unit of the Continental Army during the American Revolutionary War

- Active: 1775–1783
- Allegiance: (United States) Continental Congress
- Type: Infantry
- Part of: Pennsylvania Line
- Engagements: Battle of Fort Washington (1776); Battle of Brandywine (1777); Battle of Germantown (1777); Battle of Monmouth (1778); Sullivan Expedition (1779); Battle of Green Spring (1781)

Commanders
- Notable commanders: Colonel Robert Magaw; Lieutenant Colonel Josiah Harmar; Colonel Richard Humpton

The 6th Pennsylvania Regiment, first known as the 5th Pennsylvania Battalion, was a unit of the United States of America (U.S.) Army, raised December 9, 1775, at Philadelphia, Pennsylvania, for service with the Continental Army. The regiment would see action during the New York Campaign, Battle of Brandywine, Battle of Germantown, Battle of Monmouth, and Green Spring. The regiment was disbanded on January 1, 1783.

== Establishment ==
The regiment was authorized in December 1775 as the 5th Pennsylvania Battalion. The regiment participated in the unsuccessful defense of New York City and was captured in part at Fort Washington on November 16, 1776, along with its commander, Colonel Robert Magaw. On January 1, 1777, the survivors of the 5th Battalion, along with exchanged prisoners and new recruits, were reorganized into the 6th Pennsylvania Regiment. Most of the regiment's men were recruited from Berks and Chester counties, although many came from Philadelphia and as far away as Northumberland County.

During 1777, the regiment participated in the Philadelphia Campaign and fought at the Battles of Brandywine (September 11) and Germantown (October 4). At Brandywine, the women of the 6th Pennsylvania were cited for their bravery under fire while bringing water to the men. The regiment spent the winter of 1777–78 at Valley Forge and took part in the Battle of Monmouth (June 28) the following summer.

In 1779, the light infantry company of the 6th Pennsylvania was part of the Corps of Light Infantry commanded by "Mad" Anthony Wayne that stormed the British fortifications at Stony Point, NY (July 16). The regiment spent the rest of the year in garrison at West Point and probably wintered at Morristown. The next year, the regiment took part in a number of small engagements in New Jersey and again wintered at Morristown. On New Year's Day, 1781, members of the 6th Pennsylvania joined the mutiny of the Pennsylvania regiments then quartered at Morristown. After a settlement was reached, the regiment was furloughed at Trenton on January 17. Soldiers remaining in the regiment were reassigned to other units and eventually sent south to take part in the Yorktown Campaign. The regiment was officially disbanded in January, 1783, although in reality, no regiment had existed since 1781.

However, historian Mark Boatner asserts that on 26 May 1781 Wayne went south with 1,000 men and six guns of the 2nd, 5th, and 6th Pennsylvania and the 4th Continental Artillery Regiment. They joined Gilbert Motier, marquis de La Fayette in Virginia on 10 June. Colonel Richard Humpton led his troops at the Battle of Green Spring on 6 July, though on this occasion, Boatner refers to the unit as a battalion.

== Brief History of the 6th Pennsylvania Regiment ==
November 16, 1776 – Formerly known as the 5th Pennsylvania Battalion the entire unit was captured at Fort Washington, New York. The enlisted men were held by the British until December 26, 1776, when they were set free on parole.

January to June 1777 – During this period the unit was reorganized as the 6th Regiment with Colonel Henry Bicker as its commander. Many of the men who served in 1776 reenlisted and to these were added new recruits to fill out the regiment. In June the men refused to report at camp for duty as they thought they were still on parole and had not been properly exchanged. These concerns were overcome and the regiment joined the army later in the month.

June 26, 1777 – As part of Lord Stirling's Division the regiment probably joined the army in time to participate in the battle of Short Hills.

July to August 1777 – With the rest of Washington's army the 6th Regiment marched back and forth across New Jersey and into New York and Pennsylvania while trying to ascertain the destination of General Howe's army, which had embarked on the British fleet. During this time the brigade under General Thomas Conway, to which the 6th Regiment belonged, was reputed to be "the best instructed and disciplined" in the army. This was in spite of the fact that he "is detested by the officers of his brigade... because he makes his brigade work and personally drills and instructs it, instead of leaving it idle in camp.

September 11, 1777 – Stirling's Division takes part in the action on the right of Washington's army during the Battle of Brandywine. During the afternoon the forces under General John Sullivan fought with the enemy for almost two hours near Birmingham Meeting House. In this contest "Lord Sterling's Division & particularly Conway's Brigade" were seen to have "remarkably distinguished themselves." It was during this action that the "wives of several of the soldiers belonging to the 6th Pennsylvania Regiment.. took the empty canteens of their husbands and friends and returned them filled with water...during the hottest part of the engagement, although frequently cautioned as to the danger of coming into the line of fire."

October 4, 1777 – Brigadier General Thomas Conway's 3rd Pennsylvania Brigade, consisting of the 3rd, 6th, 9th, and 12th Pennsylvania Regiments, was chosen to lead the main column of Washington's army in the attack on the British at the Battle of Germantown. Leading the assault column, Captain Jacob Bower's company of the 6th Pennsylvania attacked the British pickets at Mount Airy. Conway's Brigade continued to attack and eventually drove "the enemy a mile and a half below Chew's house" before being forced to retire. At least one company of the regiment joined in the assaults on the Chew House and lost a number of men.

December 19, 1777 – After an encampment of almost six weeks at Whitemarsh, Pennsylvania, the army moved into its winter quarters at Valley Forge where they would remain for the next six months. It was here that they received a new commander, Lieutenant Colonel Josiah Harmar, on January 1, 1778. Harmar would remain in this position until 1780. After the war he became the Commander of the First American Regiment, for a time they only infantry unit in the fledgling army of the independent United States.

== Sources ==
- Boatner, Mark M. III (1994). Encyclopedia of the American Revolution. Mechanicsburg, Pa.: Stackpole Books. ISBN 0811705781.
- The 5th Pennsylvania Battalion of 1776, John Rees
- An Outline of the Origins and History of the 6th Pennsylvania Regiment. Conway's Brigade of Lord Stirling's Division, John Rees (unfinished)
- Lafayette in the Age of the American Revolution. Selected Letters and Papers. 1776–1790 – Volume 1. December 7, 1776 – March 30, 1778, Stanley J. Izerda, Editor, pp. 79 and 81
- Letters and Papers of Major-General John Sullivan Continental Army, Hammond, Otis &, Editor, Concord, 1939, Volume 3, 1779–1795, p. 474 (Brandywine), 543–546 (Germantown).
- McGuire, Thomas J. (2006). The Philadelphia Campaign, Volume I. Mechanicsburg, Penn.: Stackpole Books. ISBN 0811701786.
- McGuire, Thomas J. (2007). The Philadelphia Campaign, Volume II. Mechanicsburg, Penn.: Stackpole Books. ISBN 0811702065.
- "Revolutionary Services of Captain John Markland", Pennsylvania Magazine of History and Biography, Volume 9, pp. 105–106 (Brandywine), 107–108 (Germantown).
- Ward, Christopher (2011). The War of the Revolution,. New York, New York: Skyhorse. ISBN 978-1616080808.
- Order Book of the 6th Pennsylvania Regiment January 1, 1778, to August 10, 1779, Josiah Harmar papers, William L. Clements Library, University of Michigan
- Guthman, William H. (1974). March to Massacre: A History of the First Seven Years of the United States Army, 1784-1791. McGraw-Hill. ISBN 978-0070252974.
