= 3rd Georgia Regiment =

- Active: 1776–1781
- Allegiance: Continental Congress of the United States
- Type: Infantry
- Part of: Georgia Line
- Engagements: Savannah and Charleston

The 3rd Georgia Regiment was an infantry regiment of the Georgia Line during the American Revolutionary War. Raised in Georgia but recruited in North Carolina, the regiment fought in the Siege of Savannah and was surrendered to the British in the Siege of Charleston.

== History ==
It was raised on July 5, 1776, at Savannah, Georgia for service with the Continental Army, assigned to the Southern Department. The 3rd Georgia was organized in late 1776 with eight companies, mainly recruited in North Carolina. On 23 December 1777, it joined the Georgia Brigade of the department. The regiment saw action in Florida in 1777 and 1778, the Siege of Savannah and the Siege of Charleston. The regiment was captured along with the rest of the American southern army at Charleston, South Carolina, on May 20, 1780, by the British Army. The Regiment was disbanded on January 1, 1781.
