= Georgia Regiment of Horse Rangers =

- Active: 1776–1781
- Country: United States
- Allegiance: Continental Congress
- Branch: Continental Army
- Type: Dragoons
- Part of: Georgia Line
- Engagements: Savannah and Charleston

The Georgia Regiment of Horse Rangers were Georgia State troops that became part of the Georgia Line of the Continental Army during the American Revolution. The 1st and 2nd Troops of Georgia Horse were authorized on January 1, 1776, and were organized that spring in Savannah, Georgia. They were expanded to include the 3rd and 4th Troops of Georgia Horse, and on July 24, 1776 the four troops were adopted into the Continental Army and assigned to the Southern Department. They were re-designated as the Georgia Regiment of Horse Rangers and expanded to ten troops. On January 1, 1777 they were re-organized to consist of twelve troops. The regiment saw action in Florida (1777) and at the Siege of Savannah (1779). The Regiment was captured by the British Army, along with most of the rest of the American Southern Army, after the Siege of Charleston on May 12, 1780. The Regiment was disbanded on January 1, 1781.
