= Siege of Charleston =

1780 battle of the American Revolutionary War

- Part of the American Revolutionary War
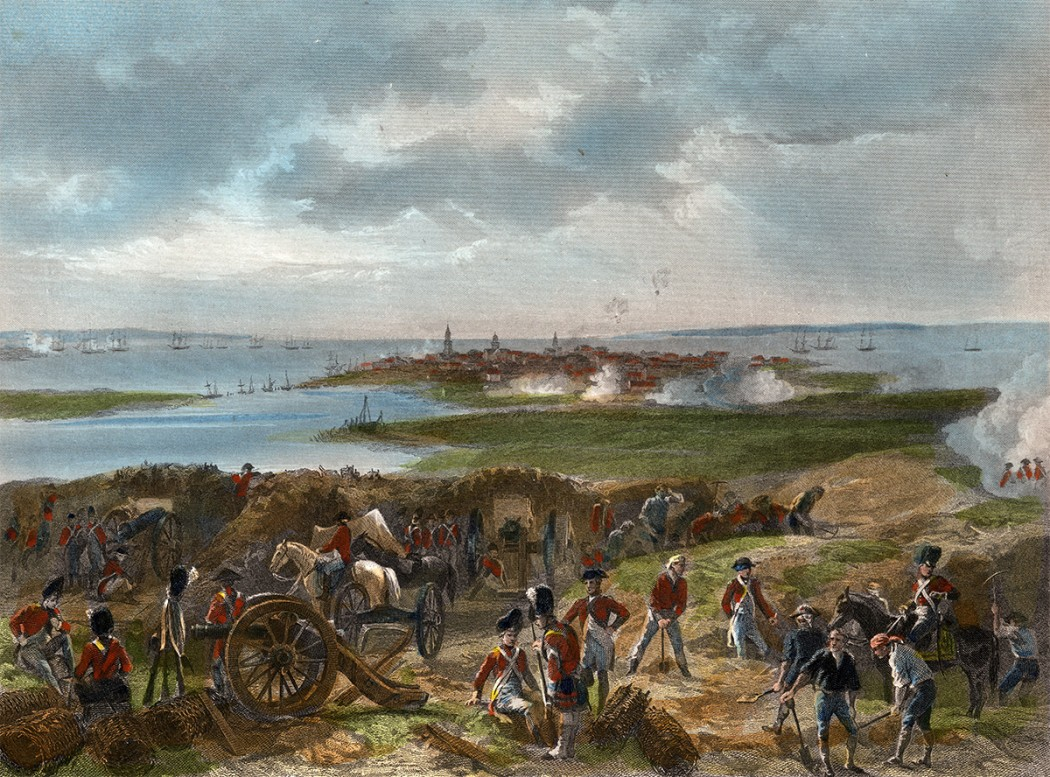
- An illustration of the siege by Alonzo Chappel
Date	March 29 – May 12, 1780 (1 month, 1 week and 6 days)
Location	Charles Town, South Carolina, U.S. 32°47′39″N 79°56′31″W
Result	British victory

Belligerents
Great Britain; Hesse-Kassel	United States; France

Commanders and leaders
(Kingdom of Great Britain) Sir Henry Clinton; (Kingdom of Great Britain) Charles Cornwallis; (Kingdom of Great Britain) Alexander Leslie; (Kingdom of Great Britain) Mariot Arbuthnot	(United States) Benjamin Lincoln (surrendered); (United States) William Moultrie (surrendered); (United States) William Woodford (surrendered); (United States) Abraham Whipple (surrendered)

Strength
12,847 regulars and militia; 4,500 sailors; 6 ships of the line; 8 frigates; 4 armed galleys; 90 transports	6,577 regulars, sailors and militia; 3 frigates; 5 sloops; 1 schooner; 1 brig; 3 armed galleys

Casualties and losses
Land: 76 killed; 89 wounded; Sea: 23 killed; 28 wounded	89 killed; 138 wounded; 5,466 captured (Note: 3,371 regulars & officers captured)

The siege of Charleston was a major engagement and major British victory in the American Revolutionary War, fought in the environs of Charles Town (today Charleston), between March 29 and May 12, 1780. The British, following the collapse of their northern strategy in late 1777 and their withdrawal from Philadelphia in 1778, shifted their focus to the North American Southern Colonies. After approximately six weeks of siege, Major General Benjamin Lincoln, commanding the Charleston garrison, surrendered his forces to the British. It was one of the worst American defeats of the war.

== Background ==
By late 1779, two major British strategic efforts had failed. An army invading from Quebec under John Burgoyne had surrendered to the Americans under Horatio Gates at the Battles of Saratoga, which inspired both the Kingdom of France and Spain to declare war on Great Britain in support of the Americans. Meanwhile, a strategic effort led by Sir William Howe to capture the Revolutionaries' capital of Philadelphia had met with limited success. Having replaced his superior as Commander-in-Chief of the American Station, Sir Henry Clinton withdrew all his forces back to New York City to reinforce the city against a possible Franco-U.S. attack.

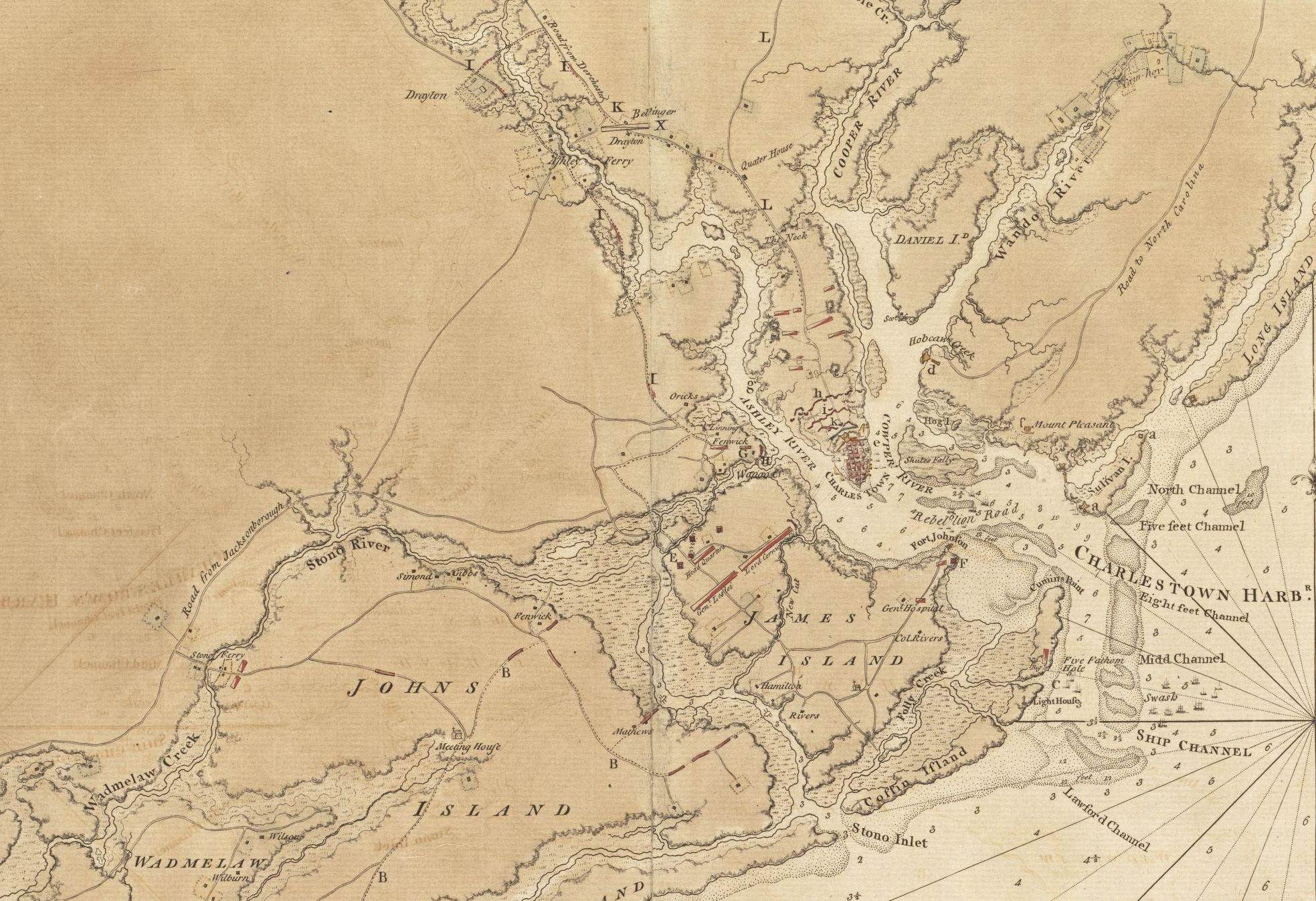
Detail of a 1780 map drawn by a British engineer showing the Charleston defenses

Stymied by the Fabian strategy adopted by Continental general George Washington and, under increasing political pressure to deliver victory, the British turned to launching their "Southern Strategy" to force a capitulation of the Americans. The British were persuaded that there was a strong Loyalist sentiment in the South, where major planters and merchants had a variety of economic and familial ties with Great Britain. It was expected that these Loyalists would rise against the American Patriots in large numbers. The opening British action was the Capture of Savannah, Georgia in December 1778. After repulsing an assault on Savannah by a combined Franco-American force in October 1779, the British planned to capture Charleston, South Carolina, intending to use the city as a base for further operations in the southern colonies.

Clinton evacuated Newport, Rhode Island, in October 1779, and left the substantial garrison of New York City under the command of Wilhelm von Knyphausen. In December, the day after Christmas 1779, Clinton and his second-in-command, Charles Cornwallis, sailed southward with 8,500 troops and 5,000 sailors on 90 troopships and 14 warships. After a very stormy voyage, the fleet anchored in the Savannah River on 1 February 1780. By 12 February, Clinton had landed his army 30 miles south of Charleston on Simmons Island. By 24 February, the British had crossed the Stono River onto James Island, and by 10 March, Lord Cornwallis had made it to the mainland. By 22 March, they had advanced to Middleton Place and Drayton Hall, and on 29 March 1780, crossed the Ashley River.

Clinton had issued the Philipsburg Proclamation in 1779, promising freedom for slaves owned by Patriots who escaped to British lines and aided their cause. Slaves left both the city and countryside around Charleston to join the British around the city. Among those former slaves, known as Black Loyalists, evacuated by the British after the war was John Kizell, who had been captured as a child from the area of Sierra Leone and transported to South Carolina. He eventually returned to Sierra Leone and aided the American Colonization Society.

== Siege ==
Cutting the city off from relief, Clinton began a siege on 1 April, 800 yards from the American fortifications located at today's Marion Square. Whipple, deciding the bar was indefensible, scuttled his fleet at the mouth of the Cooper River. Then Arbuthnot, on 8 April, brought his 14 vessels safely into the harbor, past the roaring guns of Fort Moultrie, the same day Woodford arrived with 750 Virginia Continentals.

In order to consolidate British control of the immediate area, Clinton dispatched Banastre Tarleton and Patrick Ferguson to capture Monck's Corner on 14 April. On 18 April, Lt. Col. Lord Rawdon arrived with 2,500 men, including the 42nd Highlanders, the Hessian von Ditfurth Regiment, the Queen's Rangers, Prince of Wales American Volunteers, and the Volunteers of Ireland. Charleston was completely surrounded by the British.

Governor John Rutledge escaped on 13 April. On 21 April, Continental leader Benjamin Lincoln requested a surrender with "honours of war", which was rejected by Clinton. On 23 April, Lord Cornwallis crossed the Cooper River with the Volunteers of Ireland and Carolina Tory militia, joining Lt. Col. James Webster's 33rd Foot and 64th Foot, blocking further escape from the left bank. On 25 April, civilians led by Christopher Gadsden prevented any action on Lincoln's part in withdrawing the Continental regiments. On 6 May, Tarleton won another engagement in the Battle of Lenud's Ferry, while the British siege works had advanced far enough towards the Charleston fortifications to drain the canal in front.

On 7 May, Fort Moultrie surrendered without a fight. On May 8, Clinton called for Lincoln's unconditional surrender, but Lincoln attempted to negotiate for the honours of war. On May 11, Gadsden and other citizens asked Lincoln to surrender. On the same day, the British fired heated shot into the city, burning several homes, and Lincoln felt forced to call for a parlay to negotiate terms for surrender. On May 12, Lincoln formally surrendered 3,371 men to the British.

When word reached the backcountry, the American troops holding Ninety-Six and Camden also surrendered to the British.

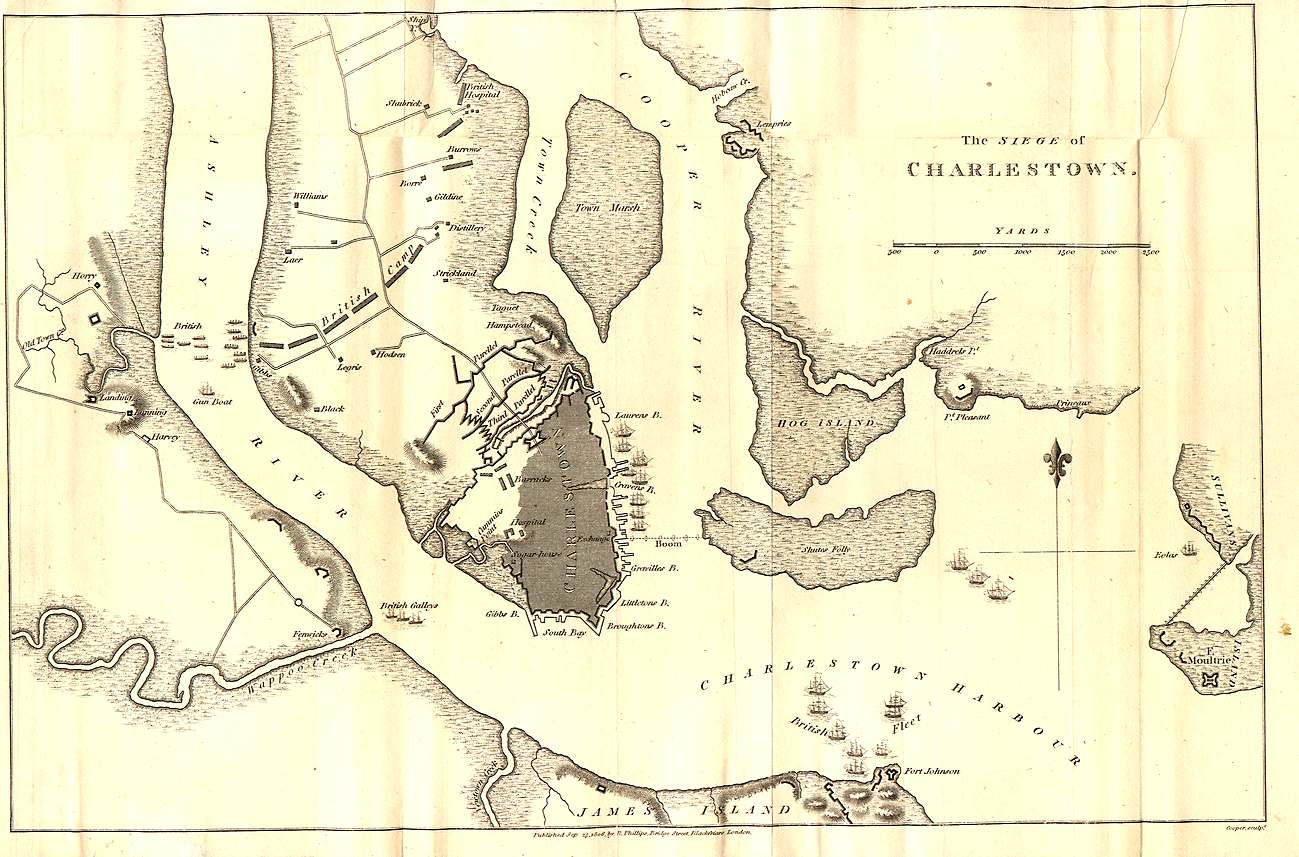
Charleston map showing the distribution of British forces during the siege

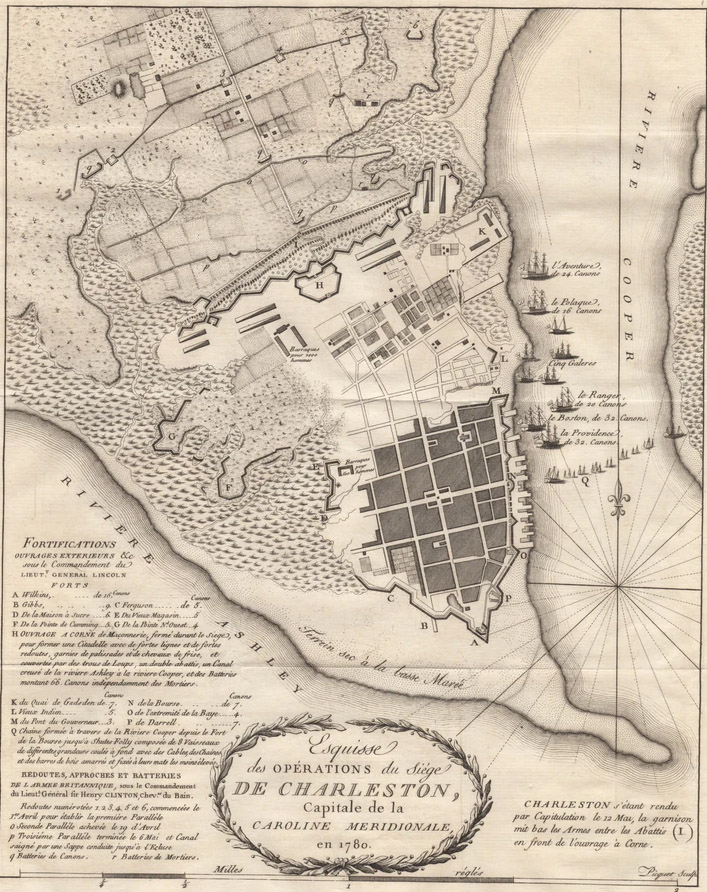
Siege of Charleston map 1780

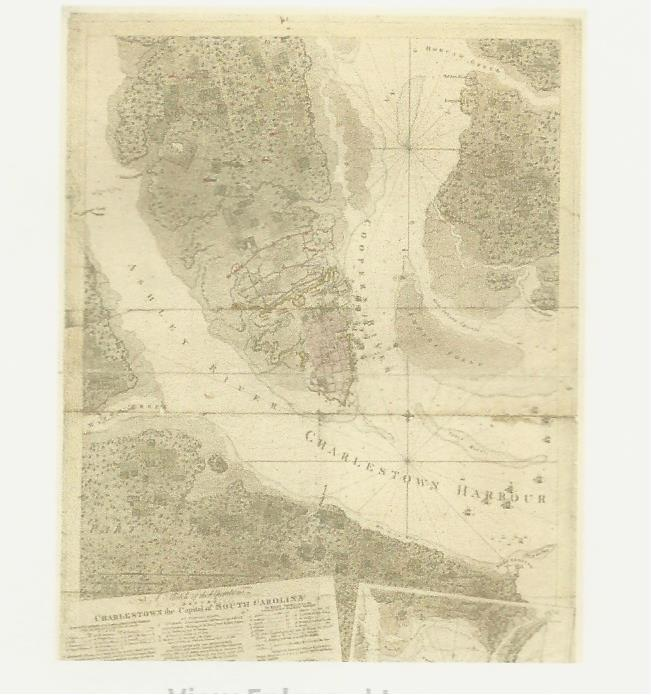
A sketch of the operations before Charlestown, the capital of South Carolina 1780 Siege

== Aftermath ==
The British captured 5,266 troops, 311 artillery pieces, 9,178 artillery rounds, 5,916 muskets, 33,000 rounds of ammunition, 15 regimental colours, 49 ships and 120 boats, plus 376 barrels of flour, and large magazines of rum, rice and indigo. Following the surrender, the captured ordnance was brought to a powder magazine. A Hessian officer warned that some of the guns might still be loaded, but he was ignored. One prematurely fired, detonating 180 barrels of powder, further discharging 5,000 muskets in the magazine. The accident killed approximately 200 people and destroyed six houses.

The prisoners of the siege were diverted to multiple locations, including prison ships, the old barracks where the College of Charleston is today (two barracks buildings are shown on early maps of the campus), and the Old Exchange and Provost "Dungeon". Prison hulks awaited the majority of the 2,571 Continental prisoners, while parole was granted to the militia and civilians who promised not to take up arms. This ended the power of an American army in the South. The defeat was a serious blow to the Patriot cause. It was the largest American surrender until September 15, 1862, when 12,419 Union troops surrendered to the Confederate army at Battle of Harpers Ferry during the Maryland campaign. The surrender at Charleston left no substantial American army in the South, and the region became vulnerable to British offensives. British forces consolidated their hold, and had driven the remaining Continental Army troops from South Carolina consequent to the May 29 Battle of Waxhaws.

During their surrender the American forces were denied honors of war, leading General George Washington to deny the same to Cornwallis' army during its surrender at the siege of Yorktown, stating that "The same Honors will be granted to the Surrendering Army as were granted to the Garrison of Charles Town." On June 5, Clinton sailed back to New York City, believing his presence necessary to defend against a potential Franco-American attack, leaving command of the southern theater to Cornwallis, with orders to reduce opposition in North Carolina. Though the effects of the surrender at Charleston were substantial, the British error in strategy soon became apparent. As no popular uprising of Loyalists took place, control of the countryside was difficult. Instead, resistance in South Carolina degenerated into a period of chaotic guerrilla warfare in the outlying areas.

== Order of battle ==
=== British forces ===
The joint British naval-army forces were led overall by Sir Henry Clinton, with his subordinate, Lord Cornwallis as his second-in-command. The British regular troops were led by Brigadier General Alexander Leslie.

The ground and naval forces were composed thus:

British order of battle
- 1st Battalion of Light Infantry, composed of the Light Companies of the 7th, 22nd, 33rd, 37th, 42nd, 54th, 63rd, 70th and the 74th Regiments of Foot (640).
- 2nd Battalion of Light Infantry, composed of the Light Companies of the 23rd, 38th, 43rd, 57th, 64th, 76th, 80th, and the 84th Regiments of Foot (637).
- 1st Battalion of Grenadiers, composed of the Grenadier Companies of the 7th, 17th, 23rd, 33rd, 37th, 38th, 42nd, and the 43rd Regiments of Foot (611).
- 2nd Battalion of Grenadiers, composed of the Grenadier Companies of the 22nd, 54th, 57th, 63rd, 64th, 70th, and the 74th Regiments of Foot (526).
- 7th Regiment of Foot (463).
- 23rd Regiment of Foot (400).
- 33rd Regiment of Foot (450).
- 63rd Regiment of Foot (400).
- 64th Regiment of Foot (350).
- 2nd Battalion of the 60th Regiment of Foot (45).
- A Brigade of four battalions of Hessian Grenadiers (1,525).
- King's American Regiment of Loyalists (167).
- A Corps of Hessian Jaegers (224).
- Royal Regiment of Artillery – No. 1 and 6 Companies of the 3rd Battalion, No 1, 2, 3, 4, 5 and 8 Companies of the 4th Battalion (200), and Hesse-Kassel artillery.
- A detachment of Royal Navy artillery with 47 guns.
- A detachment of Slaves employed in the Artillery batteries (154).
- A Corps of guides and Pioneers (72).
- A Brigade of Engineers and Black Pioneers
- A Brigade of British reinforcements from Georgia, composed of;
  - 1st and 2nd Battalions of the 71st Highlanders (869).
  - Light companies of the 16th and the 71st (243).
  - Light company of the 3rd Battalion, New Jersey Volunteers.
  - 17th Regiment of Light Dragoons (73).
  - A Brigade of Engineers and Black Pioneers (206).
  - The British Legion Cavalry (211).
  - The British Legion Infantry (287).
  - Patrick Ferguson's Battalion of American volunteers (335).
  - Two battalions of The South Carolina RoyalistsSouth Carolina Loyalist (372).
  - Royal North Carolina Regiment of Loyalists.
  - A company of Georgia loyalist militia (32).
  - A squadron of Georgia loyalist dragoons (40).
  - New York volunteers.
- A Brigade of British reinforcements from New York City, composed of;
  - Two Battalions of the 42nd Regiment of Foot.
  - A Hessian regiment of Fusiliers.
  - The Prince of Wales American Regiment (334).
  - Queen's Rangers Regiment of Loyalists (200).
  - The Volunteers of Ireland Regiment of Loyalists (~423).

The British naval forces that accompanied the invasion were commanded by Vice Admiral Mariot Arbuthnot, and were composed thus:

- 4,500 personnel
- Ships
  - HMS Europa (500 men, 65 guns)
  - HMS Raisonnable (500 men, 64 guns)
  - HMS Renown (350 men, 50 guns)
  - HMS Romulus (280 men, 44 guns)
  - HMS Rainbow (350 men, 44 guns)
  - HMS Roebuck (280 men, 44 guns – Flagship)
  - HMS Blonde (220 men, 32 guns)
  - HMS Perseus (20 guns)
  - HMS Camilla (160 men, 20 guns)
  - HMS Raleigh (220 men, 32 guns)
  - HMS Virginia (200 men, 28 guns)
  - HMS Richmond (220 men, 32 guns)
  - HMS Vigilant (160 men, 22 guns – later burnt as unfit)
  - HM armed ship Germaine (125 men, 20 guns)
  - Armed galleys
    - HM galley Comet (40 men, 7 guns)
    - HM galley Scourge
    - HM galley Vindictive
    - HM galley Viper
- 90 transport ships accompanied the fleet, including:
  - HMS Polly
  - Aeolus
  - Apollo
  - Diana
  - Russia Merchant
  - Silver Eel

=== Franco-American forces ===
The Franco-American garrison of Charleston was overall led by Benjamin Lincoln. The Continental Army troops were nominally led by Brigadier General William Moultrie.

The ground and naval forces were composed thus:

Franco-American order of battle
- A brigade of South Carolina Continentals:
  - 1st South Carolina Regiment (231).
  - 2nd South Carolina Regiment (266).
  - 3rd South Carolina Regiment (302).
  - Pulaski's Legion of Infantry.
- A brigade of North Carolina Continentals:
  - 1st North Carolina Regiment (260).
  - 2nd North Carolina Regiment (244).
  - 3rd North Carolina Regiment (~94).
  - A Corps of South Carolina light infantry (175).
- 2nd Virginia brigade: Brigadier General Charles Scott
  - 1st Virginia Detachment (258). Colonel Richard Parker (KIA), Lieutenant Colonel Samuel Hopkins
  - 2nd Virginia Detachment (323). Colonel William Heth
  - A squadron of the 1st and 3rd Continental Light Dragoons (31).
  - A squad of Armand's Legion (4).
  - A squadron of the Georgia Regiment of Horse Rangers (41).
  - A group of Georgia continental officers (6).
  - A battalion of North Carolina Light Infantry (202).
  - A detachment of North Carolina Light Dragoons
- A brigade of Continental Artillery consisting of 391 guns
- A brigade of Engineers (7 men, 600 slaves)
- 1st brigade of South Carolina militia:
  - Beaufort District Regiment of Militia
  - 1st Battalion of the Charles Town District Regiment of Militia (302).
  - 2nd Battalion of the Charles Town District Regiment of Militia (485).
  - Granville County Regiment of Militia
  - Colleton County Regiment of Militia
  - Berkeley County Regiment of Militia
- 2nd brigade of South Carolina militia:
  - Camden District Regiment of Militia
  - Fairfield Regiment of Militia
  - 1st Spartan Regiment of Militia
  - 2nd Spartan Regiment of Militia
  - New Acquisition District Regiment of Militia
- 3rd brigade of South Carolina militia:
  - Upper Ninety-Six District Regiment of Militia
  - Lower Ninety-Six District Regiment of Militia
  - Lower District Regiment of Militia
  - Little River District Regiment of Militia
  - Orangeburgh District Regiment of Militia
- 4th brigade of South Carolina militia:
  - Cheraws District Regiment of Militia
  - Georgetown District Regiment of Militia
  - Lower Craven County Regiment of Militia
  - Upper Craven County Regiment of Militia
  - Kingstree Regiment of Militia
- A brigade of North Carolina militia:
  - 1st North Carolina regiment of militia (9 known companies)
  - 2nd North Carolina regiment of militia (9 known companies)
  - 3rd North Carolina regiment of militia (18 known companies)
  - 4th North Carolina regiment of militia (7 known companies)
- A brigade of Virginia militia:
  - Amelia County Militia
  - A company of the Chasseurs-Volontaires de Saint-Domingue (43).
  - A Spanish company of militia (42).
- 1st Virginia Brigade of Continentals, arrived as reinforcements on April 8: Brigadier General William Woodford
  - 1st Virginia Regiment (336). Colonel William Russell
  - 2nd Virginia Regiment (306). Colonel John Neville
  - 3rd Virginia Regiment (252). Colonel Nathaniel Gist

The Franco-American naval forces that accompanied the defence of the city were commanded by Commodore Abraham Whipple, and were composed thus:

- Continental Navy ships:
  - USS Ranger (35 Marines, 18 guns)
  - USS Queen of France (50 marines, 28 guns)
  - USS Providence (16 marines, 32 guns)
  - USS Boston (50 marines, 30 guns)
- South Carolina State Navy ships:
  - Bricole (44 guns)
  - General Moultrie (20 guns)
  - Notre Dame (16 guns)
  - Marquis de Britigney (7 guns)
  - Lee (4 guns)
  - Revenge (7 guns)
- French Navy ships:
  - L'Aventure (26 guns)
  - Truite (26 guns)
  - Zephyr (18 guns)

== Preservation ==
The American Battlefield Trust and its partners have acquired and preserved 88 acres (0.36 km^{2}) of battlefield land in Charleston related to the siege as of mid-2023.

== See also ==
- List of American Revolutionary War battles
- American Revolutionary War § War in the South. Places ' Siege of Charleston ' in overall sequence and strategic context.
