= Red Hook Lane Arresick =

Red Hook Lane Arresick is a revolutionary war burial ground in Red Hook, Brooklyn. During the Battle of Brooklyn, General Stirling's retreating forces fought a rearguard action. Continental Army riflemen fleeing the destruction of Fort Defiance fired shots at British troops advancing on the Carnarsie Indian path through Gowanus, killing a Lt. Colonel and his aide. They and the Pennsylvanian rifleman who shot them are buried together nearby on the path later called Red Hook Lane.

== Fort Defiance ==
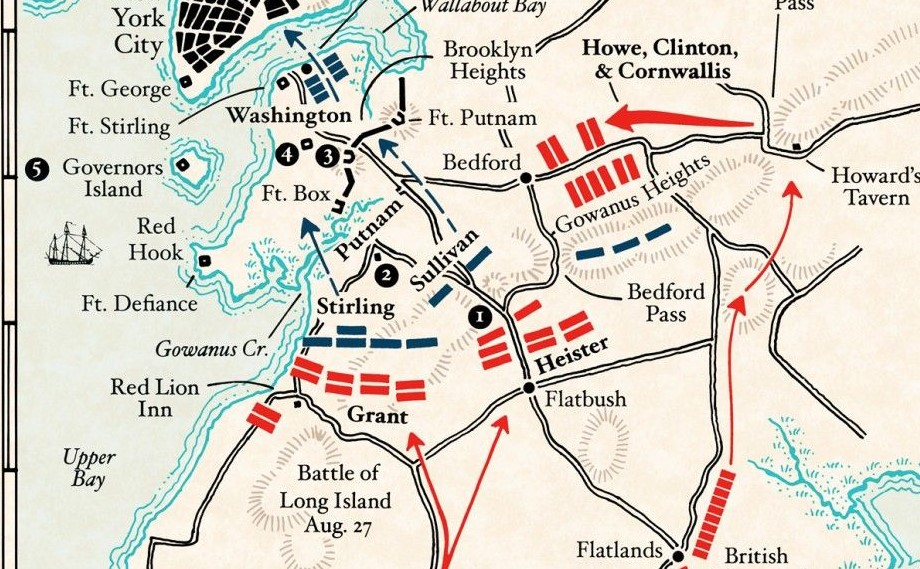
the Battle of Brooklyn

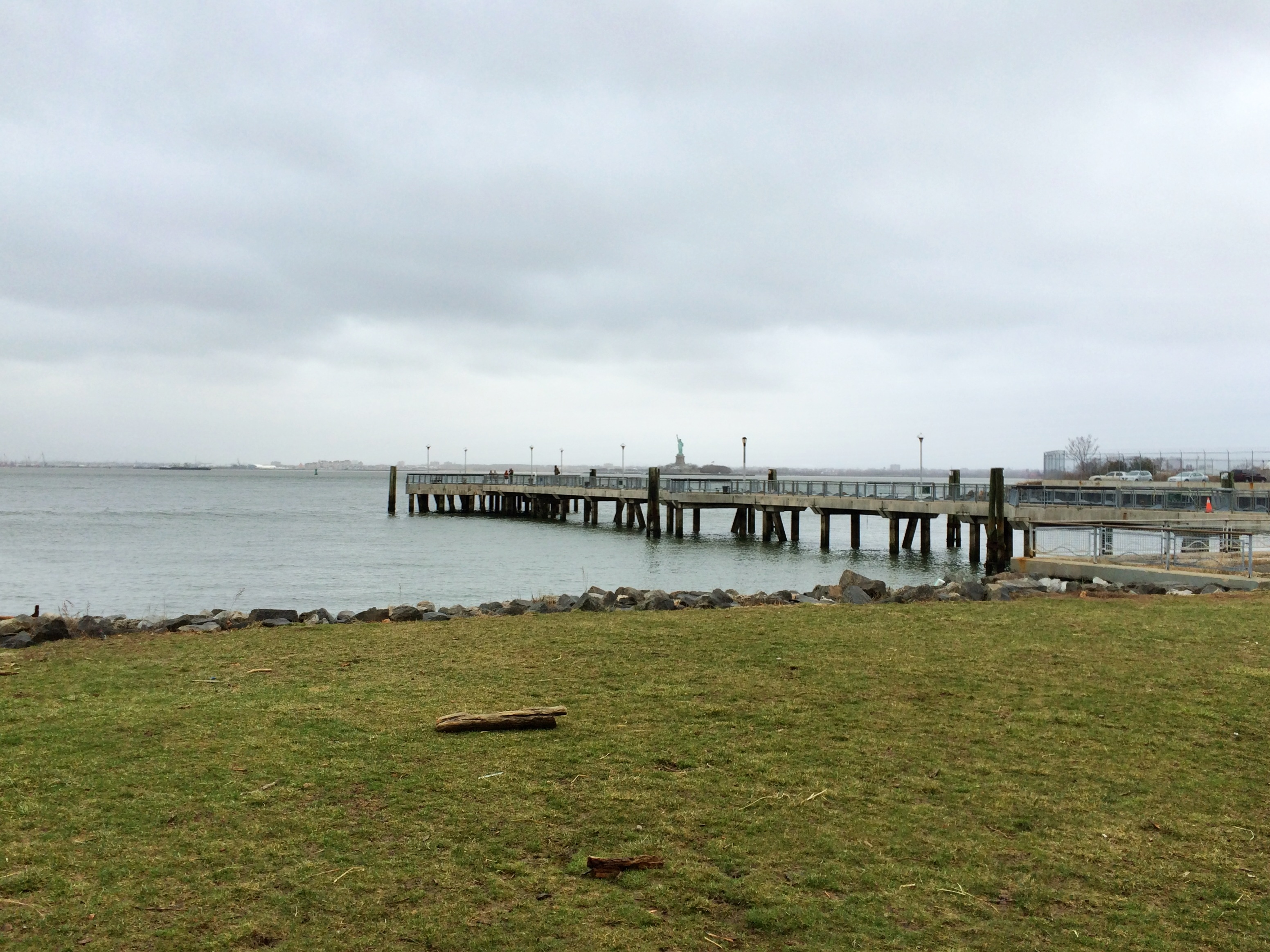
Red Hook, View of Buttermilk channel

Cypress Tree Island was a tidewater marsh which the arriving Dutch in 1630 called Roode Hoek, from the red clay nearby. Dutch expertise in filling swampy ground served the peninsula well, solid ground was needed for the heavy cannons and the 40–50 feet of elevation gave the colonials advantage. Fort Defiance is unmarked with the exception of a small historical sign at the end of the Coffey Street pier, about 2 blocks away from its true location at Van Dyke street and Conover street. The fort was destroyed by bombardment from the H.M.S. Roebuck during the battle. The only access was an Indian trail called Red Hook Lane which led to brooklyn heights, that road's last remnant was un-mapped in 2020.

On August 27, 1776, during the Battle of Long Island, five cannons, a series of earthworks and a defensive wall was manned by colonials on an island in New York Bay. It was the westernmost of forts along Brooklyn heights defending the Upper New York Bay from incursion by the British navy. Prior to the battle a thousand men worked under General Israel Putnam's direction to prepare for the invasion of New York, building the fort during one night in April. General George Washington inspected the fort in May, finding it 'exceedingly strong'. The complex consisted of three redoubts on the small island connected by trenches, with an earthwork on the island's south side to defend against a landing.

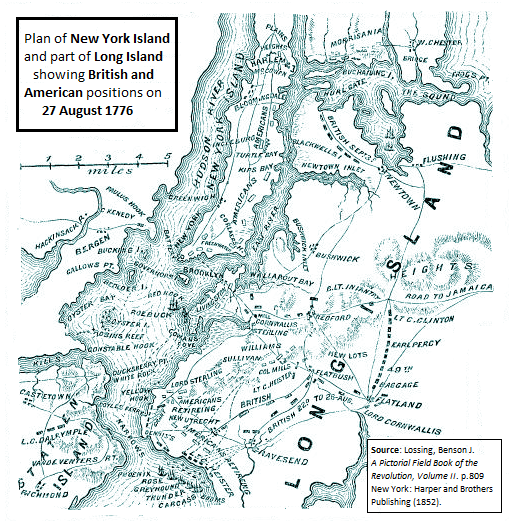
Map marking British and American positions at the Battle of Long Island. Roebuck is shown bombarding an American battery at Red Hook

== Death of Colonel James Grant ==
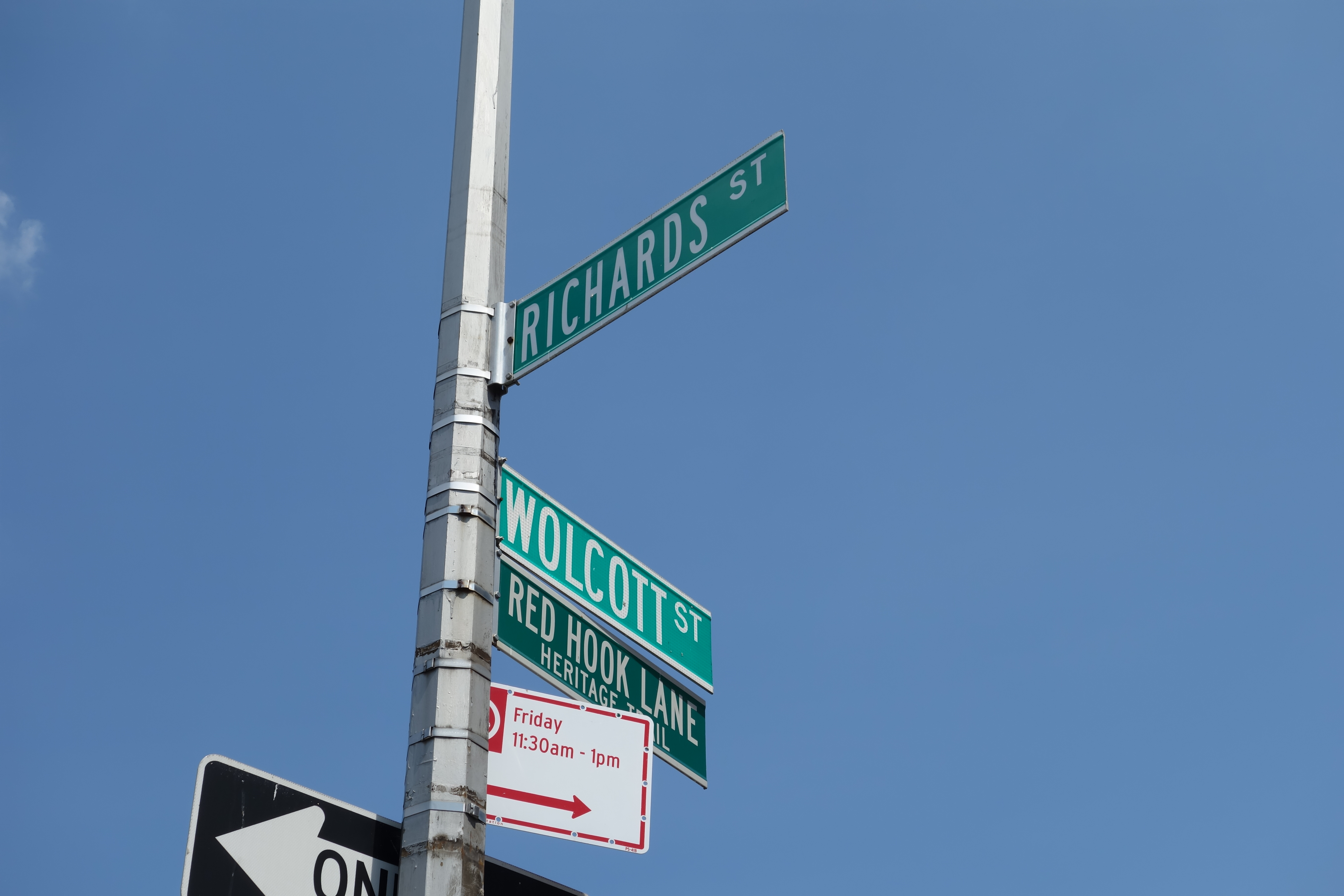
Richards St Wolcott St - Red Hook Lane Heritage Trail

A British officer, Lt. Colonel James Grant, was in the vanguard of troops attempting a flanking maneuver on the right side of the American line, following the retreat at Battle Hill. The colonel pursued through the marshland and over Gowanus Creek when a Pennsylvanian rifleman, perched in a tree, shot him and an aide. The return fire dropped the minuteman, and the army paused to bury the major and the trooper next to Red Hook lane. They continued the advance on General George Washington's position in Brooklyn Heights, leaving the American where he fell. Later, sympathizers buried the minuteman in the same place. The Americans were buoyed by the name, which was sewn in the headgear, mistakenly thinking that much reviled Major-General Grant, the leader of the left wing of the Gravesend assault had been killed. The rifleman was interred in a hollow tree trunk, taken from a tree struck by lightning.

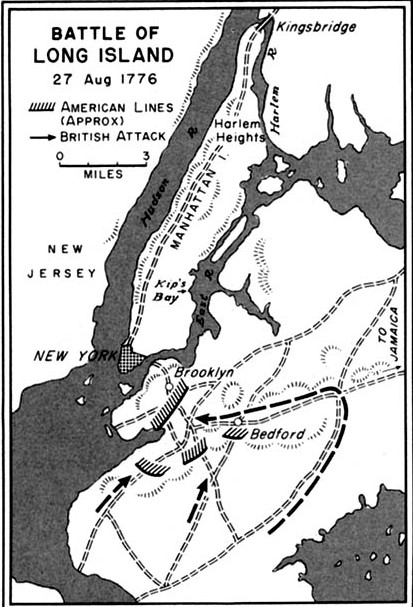
inset of map

Almost the entire New York metropolitan area was under British military occupation from the end of 1776 until November 23, 1783, when they evacuated the city.

John Burkard, a historian who grew up in Red Hook and spent most of his retirement researching the colonial history of Roode Hoek, found maps dating to 1766 showing an earlier fort on the island from the 1600s and was convinced that the oddly shaped building at Columbia and Nelson streets is the location of the burial ground. The building, built in 1932, had a corner cut off and left undeveloped, neighborhood folklore has that this was the revolutionary war arresick (Dutch.burial ground) of Lt. Colonel Grant and the two troopers. He advocated for a heritage trail through Red Hook from the Arresick to Fort Defiance. In 2007 street signs were added to Coffey street, Conover St, Walcott Street, Dwight St, and Columbia street marking the Red Hook Lane heritage trail, which begins opposite the burial ground and follows the path back to Fort Defiance.

== See also ==
- Revolutionary War Heritage Trail

== Etymology ==
Arresick, in the List of New Netherland placename etymologies

A tidal island. Spellings include Arresick, Arressechhonk, and Aresick, meaning "burial ground."
