= Old Stone House (Brooklyn) =

Historic house museum in Brooklyn, New York

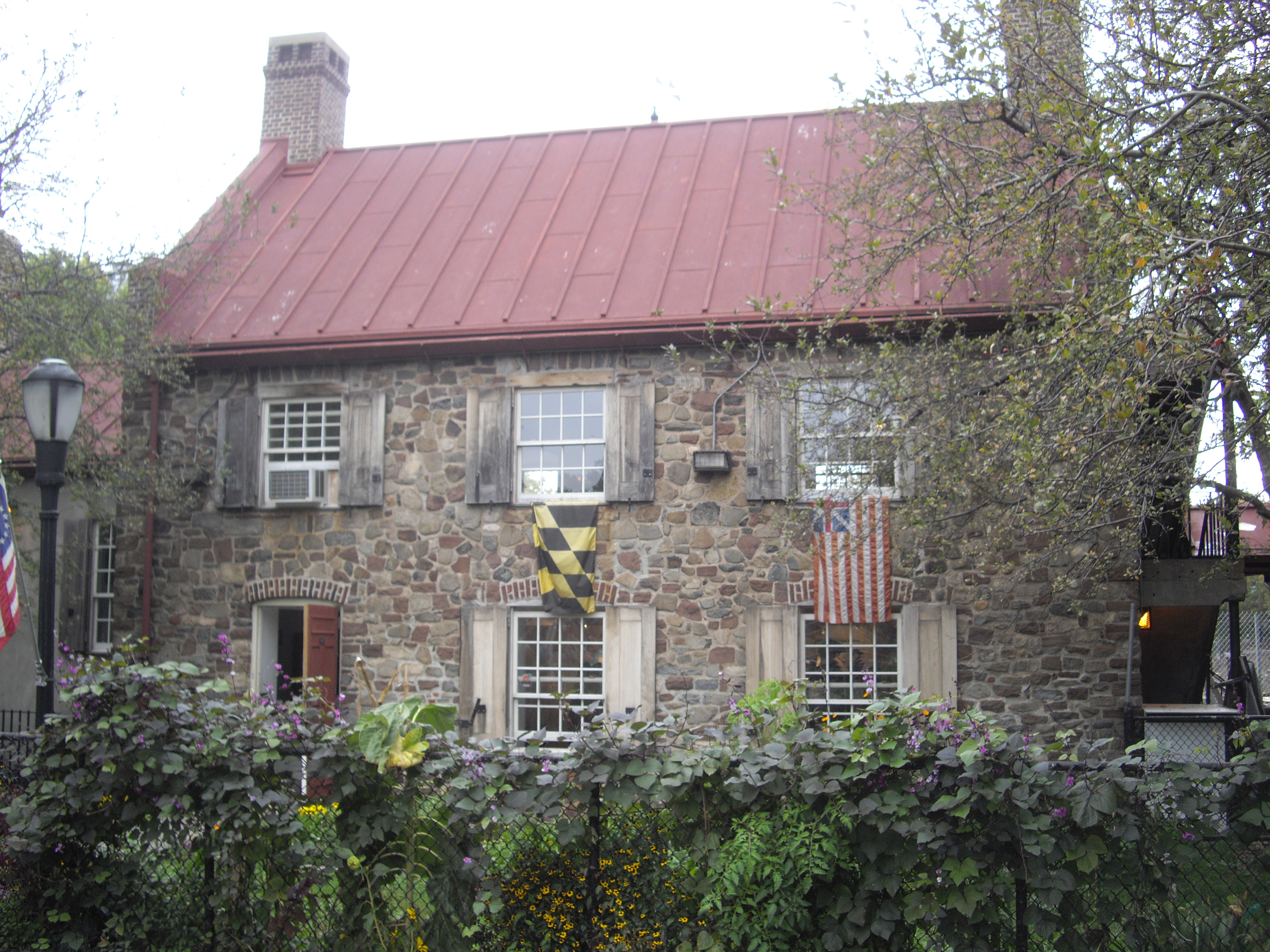
- Established: 1934
- Location: 336 3rd Street (between 4th and 5th Ave); Brooklyn, New York City
- Website: http://www.theoldstonehouse.org
- The Old Stone House of Brooklyn
- U.S. National Register of Historic Places
- New York State Register of Historic Places
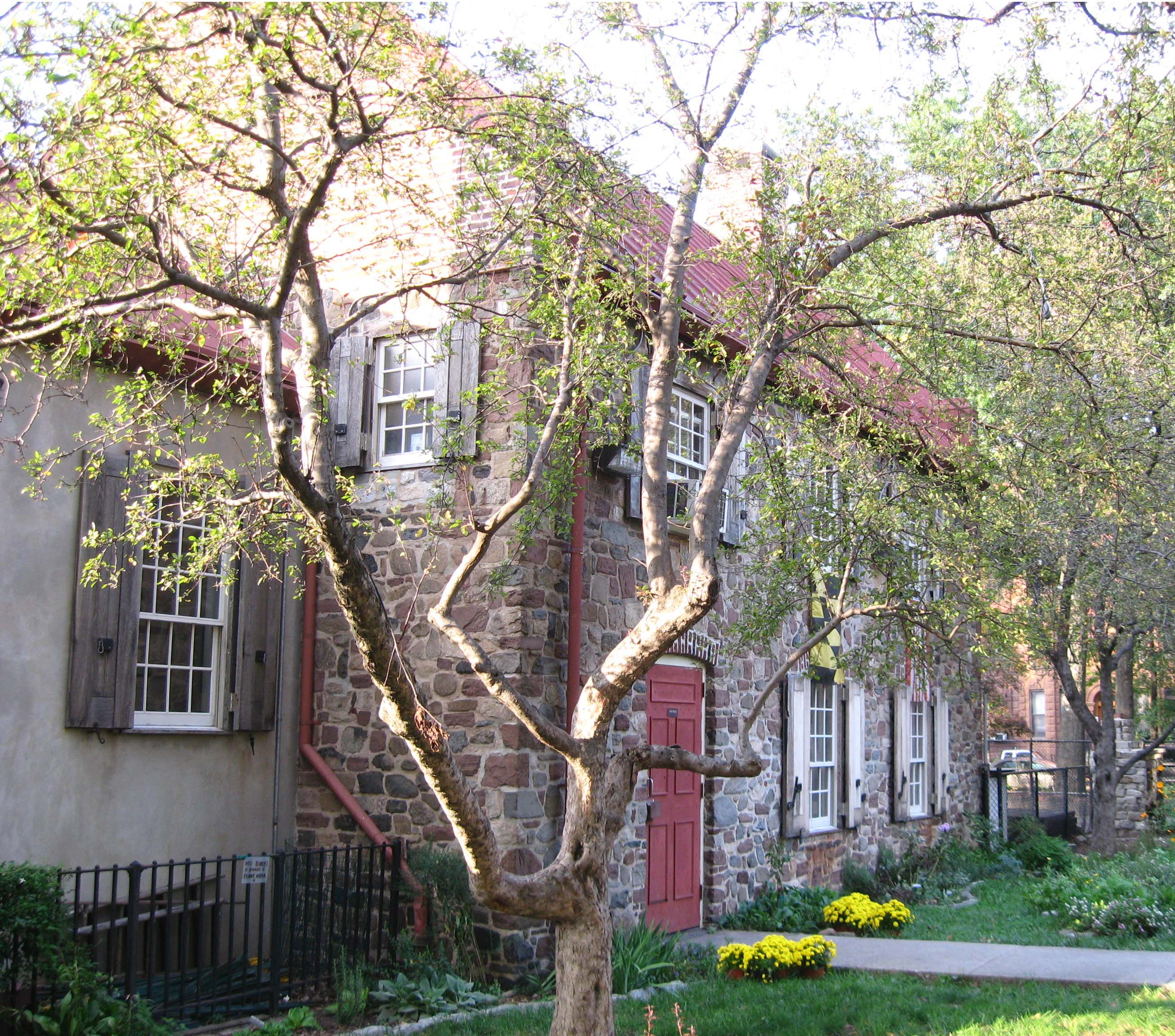

- Location within New York City Location within New York Location within the United States
- Coordinates: 40.672958°N 73.984625°W
- Built: 1935
- Architectural style: Colonial Revival
- NRHP reference No.: 12000797
- NYSRHP No.: 04701.000532

Significant dates
- Added to NRHP: September 19, 2012
- Designated NYSRHP: October 27, 2011

The Old Stone House is a house located in the Park Slope neighborhood of Brooklyn, New York City. It is situated within the J. J. Byrne Playground, at Washington Park, on Third Street between Fourth and Fifth Avenues. Gowanus Creek once ran nearby, but today the southeastern branch of the Gowanus Canal ends 1,300 feet (400 m) west of the house.

The current structure is a 1933 reconstruction, using some original materials, of the Vechte–Cortelyou House, which was destroyed in 1897. The original house was an important part of the 1776 Battle of Long Island during the American Revolutionary War.

At one time, the Old Stone House was the clubhouse of the Brooklyn Superbas, who later became the Brooklyn Dodgers. The house was listed on the National Register of Historic Places in 2012.

== First house ==
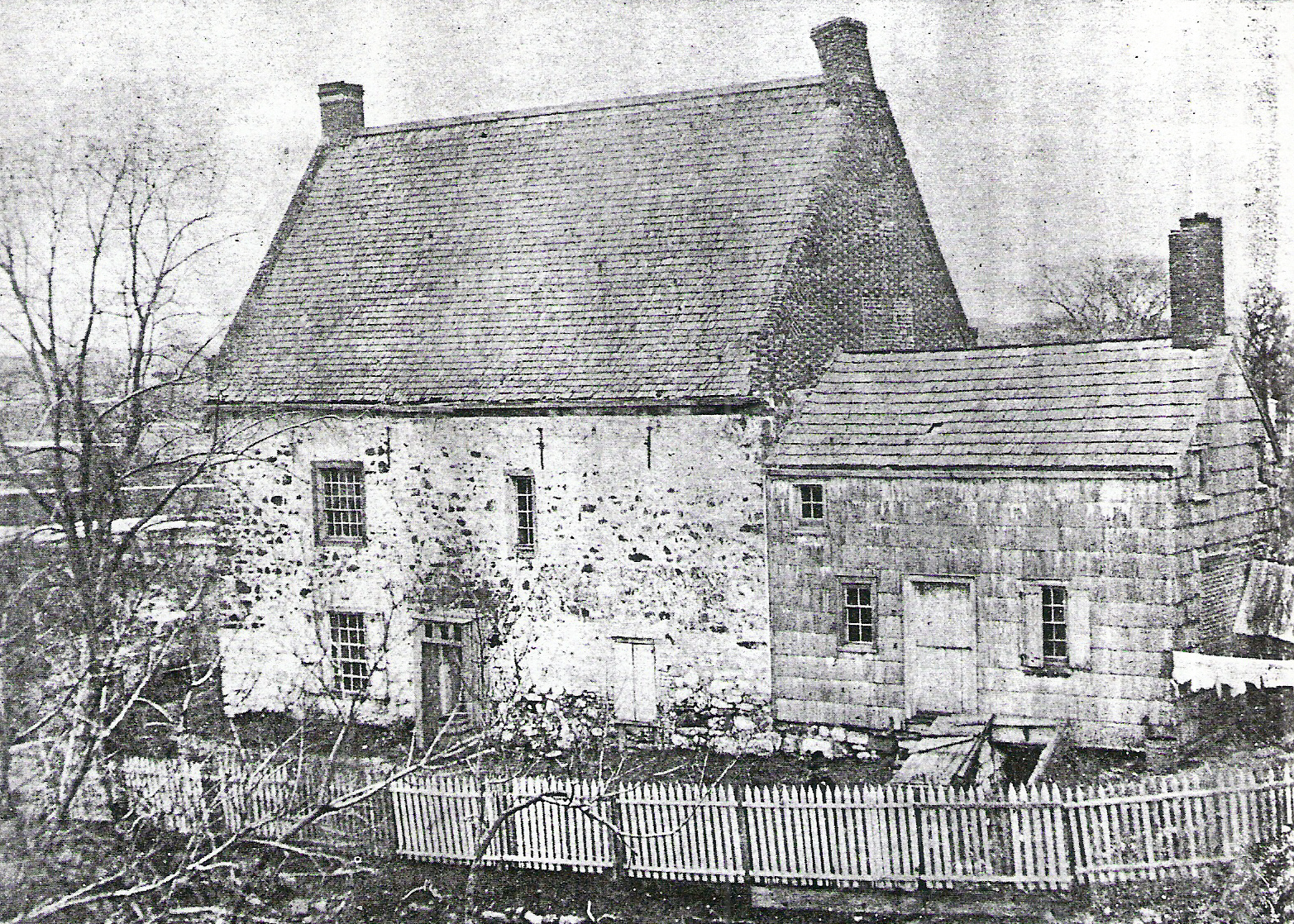
The front of the original Vechte–Cortelyou House (c. 1699); where the Maryland troops commanded by Lord Stirling and Mordecai Gist made two attacks against over two thousand British troops in a rear-guard action that allowed a majority of Stirling's 1,600-strong command to escape. The house was reconstructed in 1934 after a fire.

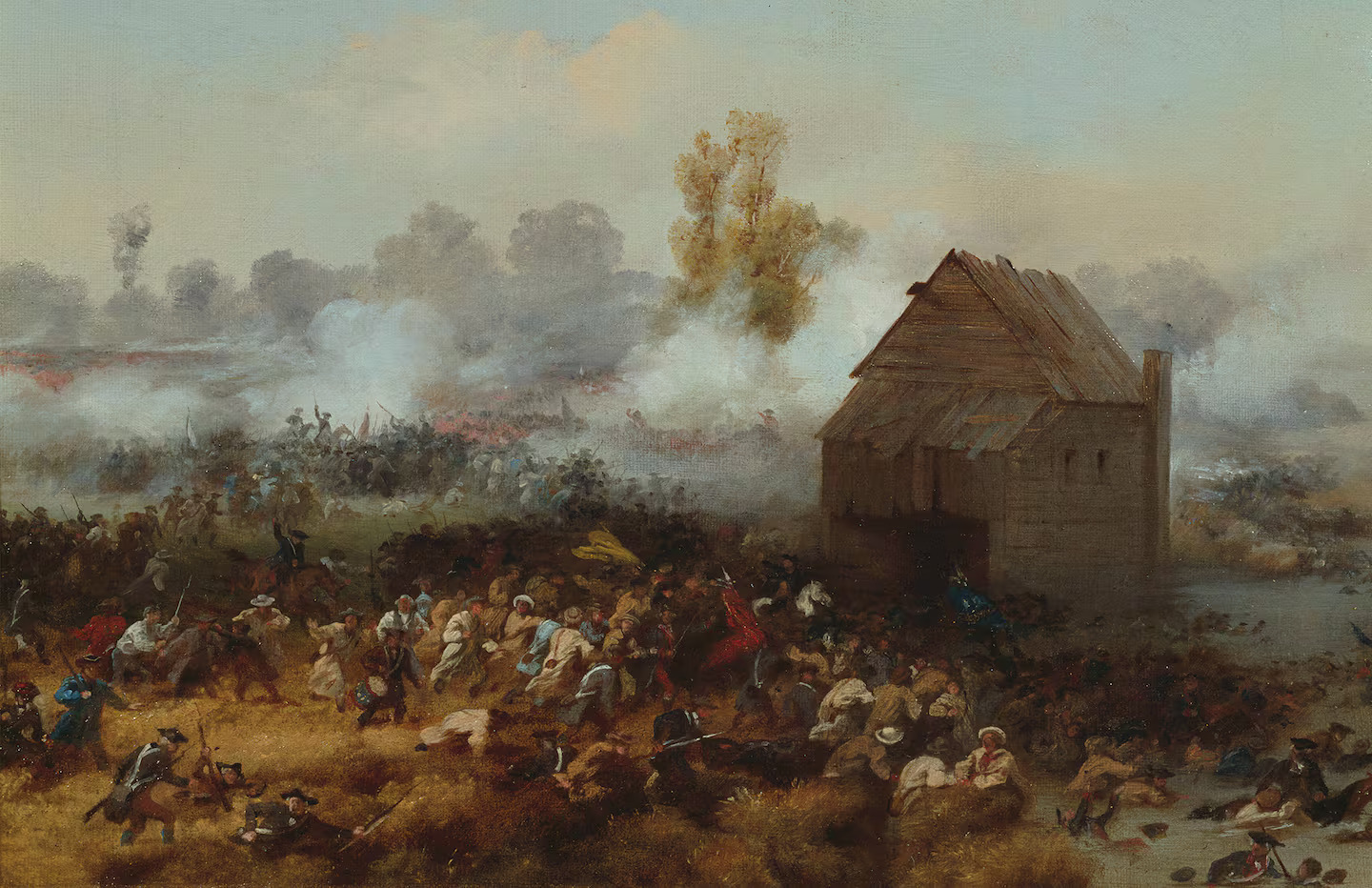
Gunpowder smoke from cannon and muskets marks where Stirling and the Maryland troops attack the British, while in the foreground the rest of the American troops escape across Brouwer's mill pond. Building pictured is the mill. (Battle of Long Island, 1858 Alonzo Chappel)

The current Old Stone House is a replica, using some unearthed original materials, of a Dutch stone farmhouse originally built adjacent to the current site by the Dutch immigrant Claes Arentson Vechte, or his son Hendrick, in 1699. It is also known as the Vechte–Cortelyou House. The Vechte family farmed the lands around the house, harvested oysters in Gowanus Creek and ferried their produce down the creek to Gowanus Bay and then to lower Manhattan. The house was rented in 1766 by Isaac Cortelyou, but later returned to Vechte. It was then inherited in 1779 by Nicholas Cowenhoven, who sold it in 1790 to Jacques Cortelyou. Cortelyou's son, Peter, later received it as a wedding gift from his father.

=== Battle of Long Island ===
On August 27, 1776, the house was an important location in the Battle of Long Island during the American Revolutionary War - the first major engagement of the Continental Army after the Declaration of Independence, and the largest battle of the entire war.

On that day, at 9:00 am, George Washington arrived from Manhattan, having been informed that the British were close to a breakthrough of American lines. Washington realized that he had been completely fooled by a feint by the British on Long Island, and he ordered more troops to Brooklyn from Manhattan. On the American right, to the west, Colonial General Stirling still held the line against Grant. Stirling held on for four hours, still unaware of the British flanking maneuver to his east, and some of his own troops thought they were winning the day because the British had been unable to take their position. This was intentional by the British. At 11:00 am, however, British General Grant, reinforced by 2,000 marines, hit Stirling's center and Stirling was attacked on his left by the Hessians. Stirling pulled back but British troops were, at this point, coming at him in his rear south down the Gowanus Road. The only escape route left was across Brouwer's Millpond on Gowanus Creek, which was 80 yards wide, on the other side of which was Brooklyn Heights.

==== Maryland 400 ====
Stirling ordered all of his troops, except a contingent of Maryland troops under the command of Major Mordecai Gist, to cross the creek. This group of Maryland troops became known to history as the Maryland 400, although they numbered about 260–270 men. Stirling and Gist led the troops in a rear-guard action against the overwhelming numbers of British troops which surpassed 2,000 troops supported by two cannon. Stirling and Gist led the Marylanders in two attacks against the British, who were in fixed positions in and in front of the Vechte–Cortelyou House (known today as Old Stone House). After the last assault the remaining troops retreated across the Gowanus Creek. Some of the men who tried to cross the marsh were bogged down in the mud under musket fire and others who could not swim were captured. Stirling was surrounded and, unwilling to surrender to the British, broke through the British lines to von Heister's Hessians and surrendered to them. 256 Maryland troops were killed in the assaults in front of the Old Stone House and fewer than a dozen made it back to the American lines. Washington, watching from a redoubt on nearby Cobble Hill, at the intersection of today's Court Street and Atlantic Avenue, was reported to have said, "Good God, what brave fellows I must this day lose!".

The 256 dead troops of the Maryland 400 were buried by the British in a mass grave on a hillock on farmer Adrian Van Brunt's land on the outskirts of the marsh. It was from this battle that Maryland gained its nickname "The Old Line State". This mass grave is believed to be around the southwest corner of what is today 3rd Ave. between 7th and 8th Streets. After its capture, the house was used as an artillery position by an estimated 2,000 British and Hessian soldiers who fired on the Americans, who had already suffered disastrous losses and were fleeing from the east to the American forts across the Gowanus Creek to the west. Some four hundred soldiers of the Maryland Brigade under Colonel William Smallwood regained the house twice that day, but were finally repulsed by the British, with very heavy casualties.

Nicholas Vechte, grandson of Claes, lived in the Old Stone House during the American Revolutionary War under the British occupation. Upon his death in 1779, the farm he willed to his grandson, Nicholas R. Cowenhoven. In 1797, Cowenhoven sold the house to Jacques Cortelyou, who purchased it for the use of his newly married son, Peter. Peter's son Jacques inherited the house in 1815. His family was the last to live in the Old Stone House.

After the death of his wife, Jacques Cortelyou sold the property to Edwin Litchfield, a railroad developer, in 1852. Litchfield lived in Litchfield Villa, now the Brooklyn headquarters of the New York City Department of Parks and Recreation. Litchfield was the major landowner of the farmland in the area at that time and sold much of his land to the city for the creation of Prospect Park.

=== Baseball clubhouse ===
After the Litchfield purchase The Old Stone House remained standing another forty years and was occupied by a caretaker during that period. It also served as a club house for a winter skating team, and then for the professional baseball team called the Brooklyn Superbas, which would later be known as the Brooklyn Dodgers before their move to Ebbets Field. The Old Stone House sits on the site of the original Washington Park, and across Fourth Avenue from the second Washington Park, two of the oldest professional baseball stadiums in New York. The left-center field wall from the second Washington Park is still visible on Third Avenue between First and Third Streets.

== Current house and museum ==
The land that the house was on was purchased by the New York City Department of Parks and Recreation in 1923 and the house, which had been razed and burned in 1897, was excavated in 1933. Half of the house was below street level when the level of Fourth Avenue had been graded up at the end of the nineteenth century. The house was reconstructed in 1934 for use as a rest room, using many of the original stones, though it was moved slightly from its original location. It underwent additional restoration in the 1970s and 1990s and was established as a memorial to the Battle of Long Island due to the efforts of members of the First Battle Revival Alliance. To honor the memory of the Maryland Continentals, the flag of Maryland flies from the house.

Today, the Old Stone House Historic Interpretive Center is operated by the Old Stone House of Brooklyn (OSH), a not-for-profit corporation, under license from the Parks Department. In addition to an exhibit on the battle, OSH offers a full program of school visits on subjects related to the history of the house and the battle and an extensive schedules of concerts, readings, lectures and other events. It is also used for a variety of events including a summer camp, Piper Theatre, and one-off events such as a sing-a-long to the musical Hamilton.

== See also ==
- Battle Hill
- Battle Pass
- Revolutionary War Heritage Trail
