= Washington Park (Brooklyn) =

Public park in Brooklyn, New York

Coordinates: 40.673°N 73.985°W

Washington Park is a city owned and operated park located in Park Slope, Brooklyn. Washington Park is both a historic site and a center for recreation, featuring the Old Stone House, a skatepark, basketball courts, a dog run, a multi-use synthetic turf field, and the J. J. Byrne Playground, a child's playground. Washington Park also features a curated garden adjacent to the Old Stone House.

== History ==
J.J. Byrne Park was acquired by Parks in 1926 and named for borough president James J. Byrne by the Board of Aldermen in 1933. The Old Stone House of Gowanus is the reconstruction of the Vechte-Cortelyou house, originally built by Claes Arents Vechte in 1699. The original building was demolished around 1897; however, its foundations were rediscovered in 1930, at which time Byrne ordered its reconstruction using the original materials. The reconstruction was completed in 1934 and the building used as a park office and comfort station.

The City of New York acquired the land for Terrapin Playground in 1948 by private purchase and condemnation. The playground opened in 1951 as J.H.S. 51 Playground because of the adjacent school which is now called William Alexander M.S. 51. When the playground opened in 1951, Byrne Park was joined with it.

=== Renaming to Washington Park ===
In 1997, the park was renamed from J.H.S 51 Playground to Washington Park by Commissioner Henry Stern to honor one of the area’s most well known inhabitants.

== Terrapin Playground ==
Terrapin Playground is the part of the park adjacent to M.S. 51. Revamped in 2008, Terrapin playground consists of handball courts, basketball courts, a skate area, and a dog run area.

=== Washington Park Skatepark ===
Also known as 51, the Washington Park Skatepark was completed in 2008.

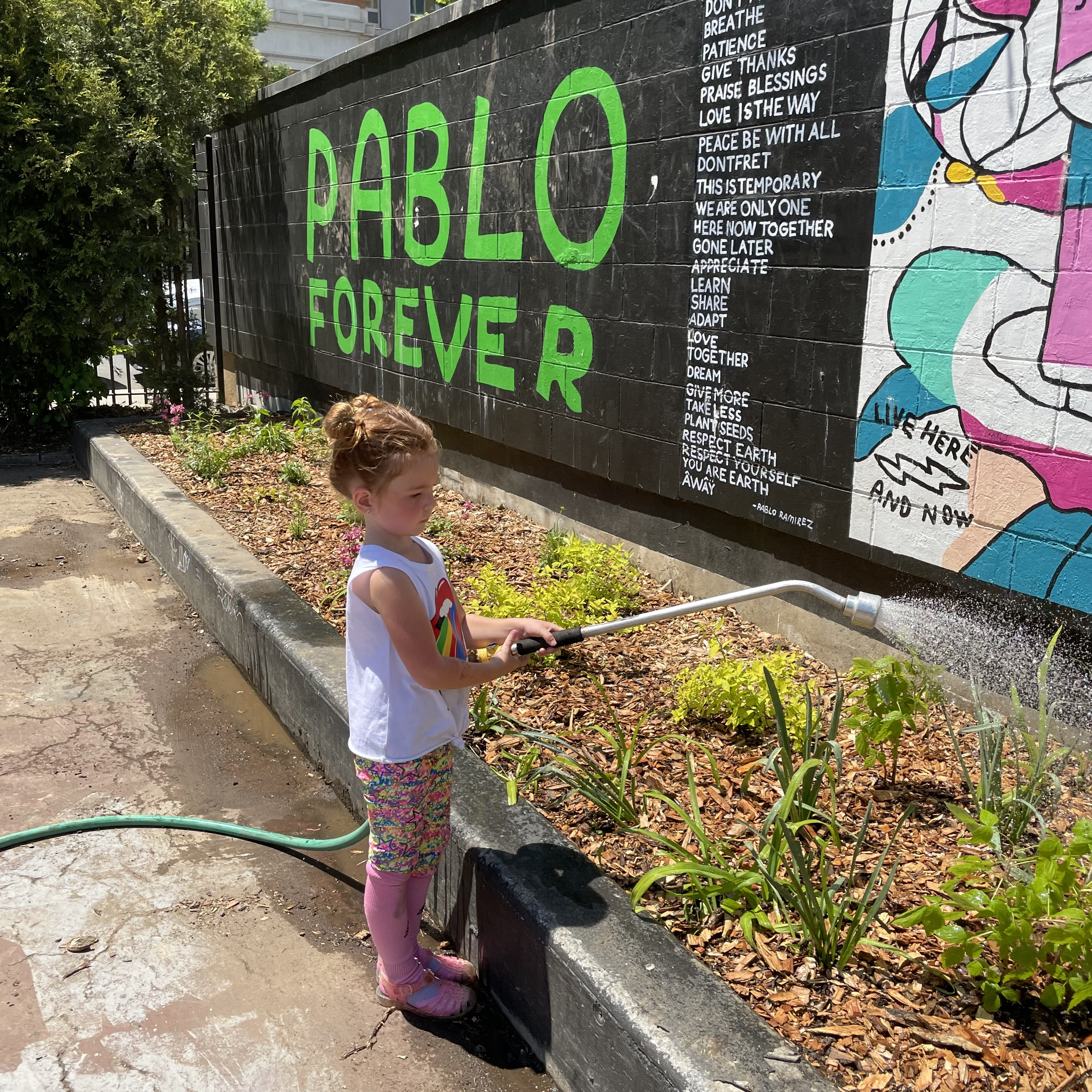
Young gardener waters at the Pablo Forever mural and garden planting at Washington Park Skatepark.

== Old Stone House gardens ==
The Gardens at Washington Park adjacent to the Old Stone House were developed starting in 2004, under the direction of environmental educator Claudia Joseph. The gardens are co-designed with the local community. The current Director of Gardens at the OSH is Sam Lewis.
