= Battle of Long Island order of battle =

Units and commanders present at the Battle of Long Island

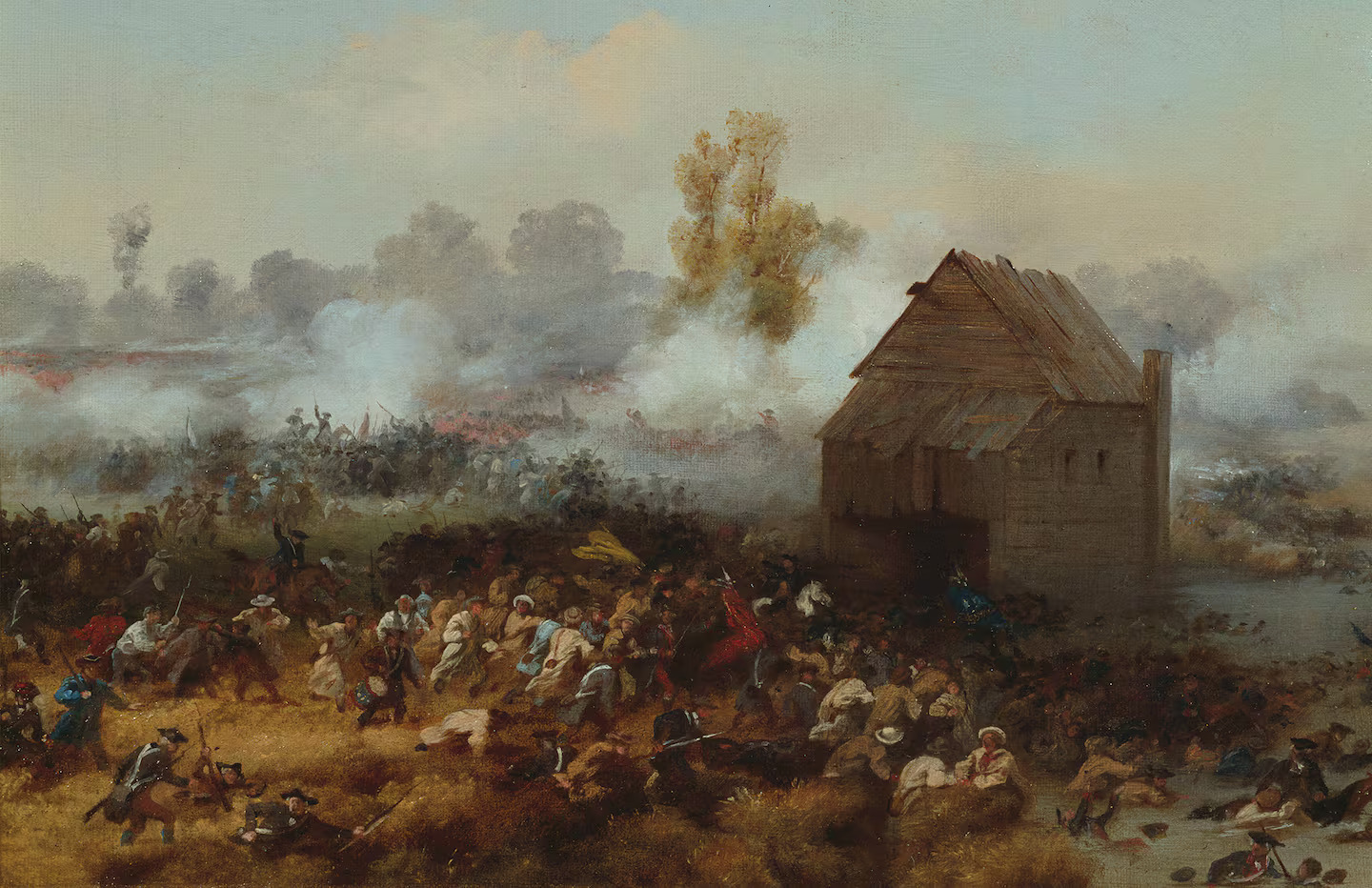
Lord Stirling leading an attack against the British in order to enable the retreat of other troops at the Battle of Long Island, 1776. Painting by Alonzo Chappel, 1858.

The Battle of Long Island, August 27, 1776, was a significant British victory in the early stages of the American Revolutionary War over American forces under the command of General George Washington, and the opening battle in a successful British campaign to gain control of New York City in 1776. The Americans had lined New York's harbor with various levels of entrenchment and fortification, which were defended by an array of Continental Army forces and militia companies from New York and nearby states. After the British made an unopposed landing on Long Island in mid-August, Washington reinforced forward positions in the hills of central Brooklyn.

The British forces were led by Lieutenant General William Howe, and included veterans of the Siege of Boston, new regiments from Ireland, and hired German troops from Hesse-Kassel. On August 27, 1776, Howe made a successful flanking maneuver around the American left while occupying the American right with diversionary battle. As a result, a significant portion of the American army became entrapped and surrendered after its retreat to the entrenched position was cut off. With a siege of the position looming, General Washington successfully withdrew his remaining army to Manhattan in the early hours of August 29.

== Key ==
- Unit: this column identifies the unit being described or summarized. Divisions, the largest unit of aggregation (called "Lines" in the British order of battle) are identified by bold text centered in a darker background spanning the table. Brigades, the intermediate unit size, are identified only by bold text. The brigades are composed of smaller units, usually regiments or battalions, but sometimes including formations as small as companies. Unless otherwise noted, a smaller unit falls within the command hierarchy of a preceding larger unit.
- Commander: the field commander of the unit on the day of the battle.
- Unit size: the reported size of the unit. This number does not normally include the officers of the unit.
- Casualties: a listing of the casualties the unit incurred, to the level documented. In the Other column, number of captured are followed by the letter C, and number of missing by the letter M.
- Notes: other notes about the unit, possibly including further details about its place of origin and its movements in the battle theater.

== British and Hessian forces ==
The British Army at the start of the campaign was drawn from three sources. The first was troops that had been in the Siege of Boston, which ended when the British evacuated their troops from the city to Halifax, Nova Scotia in March 1776. The second was new levies raised in the British Isles, including a significant number of Irish troops. The third was troops provided by several small German principalities of the Holy Roman Empire. After the war broke out in 1775, the British government realized that it would need more troops than it could raise on its own to fight the war, so it sought to hire troops from willing third parties in Europe. Only a few German rulers were willing to provide troops. The single largest contingent, with more than 12,000 arriving in North America in 1776, came from the Landgraviate of Hessen-Kassel. All of the German troops with the British at the start of the New York campaign were from Hesse-Kassel, and were under the command of Lt. Gen. Leopold Philip von Heister. A regiment from Waldeck that was also destined for the New York theater did not arrive until after Manhattan was occupied.

Some of the troops sent from Europe had first been directed at operations in the southern colonies, under the direction of Lt. Gen. Henry Clinton. The expedition attempted to occupy Charleston, South Carolina, but was repulsed in the June Battle of Sullivan's Island; it then sailed for New York to join the army as it gathered on Staten Island in July and August. Clinton served as General Howe's second in command.

It was common practice at this time for regiments of the British Army to include companies of light infantry and grenadiers, composed of troops with specialized abilities and training. When an army was assembled, these companies were often separated from their regiments and formed into separate light infantry and grenadier battalions.

The Royal Navy, despite dominating the harbor, played only a limited role in the battle. HMS Roebuck penetrated as far as Red Hook on August 26, but her guns never came within range of American positions. The navy did provide some logistical support for the battle. It resupplied General James Grant's troops with gunpowder and ammunition late in the battle, and also landed 2,000 Royal Marines to share in the victory.

The primary source for this data is a return of troops prepared by General Howe on August 22, 1776, five days before the battle, and presented by historian David Hackett Fischer. Howe's report did not include a breakdown of individual unit sizes. Although a more detailed return for August 27 appears to have once existed, none of the listed sources reproduces it. According to a summary of that return, the strength of the British land forces under Howe's command was 24,464 fit for duty. This number does not include a brigade of Loyalists raised by Oliver De Lancey, Sr., or the marines, who were not under Howe's command. Howe's headcount, including officers and those unfit for duty, came to 31,625. The casualty figures for British units are from a casualty-only return prepared by General Howe, reprinted by Field. It includes a detailed breakdown by unit of British casualties, and a summary of Hessian casualties.

=== British units ===
Unit	Commander	Casualties				Notes
Unit	Commander	Killed	Wounded	Other	Total	Notes
Light Infantry Brigade	Brigadier General Alexander Leslie	11	61	1M	73	This brigade led Clinton's column that flanked the American left. These troops were the first to occupy the unguarded Jamaica Pass.
1st Battalion Light Infantry	Major Thomas Musgrave	4	24	1M	29	This brigade led Clinton's column that flanked the American left. These troops were the first to occupy the unguarded Jamaica Pass.
2nd Battalion Light Infantry	Major John Maitland	4	31	0	35	This brigade led Clinton's column that flanked the American left. These troops were the first to occupy the unguarded Jamaica Pass.
3rd Battalion Light Infantry	Major Henry Johnson	3	6	0	9	This brigade led Clinton's column that flanked the American left. These troops were the first to occupy the unguarded Jamaica Pass.
Royal Artillery	Brigadier General Samuel Cleaveland	2	5	0	7	
Dragoons	—	0	0	0	0	The dragoons were at the head of Clinton's column in the attack.
16th Light Dragoons (The Queen's)	Lieutenant Colonel William Harcourt	0	0	0	0	The dragoons were at the head of Clinton's column in the attack.
17th Light Dragoons	Lieutenant Colonel Samuel Birch	0	0	0	0	The dragoons were at the head of Clinton's column in the attack.
First Line
Commander	Lieutenant General Henry Clinton	18	49	0	67	
1st Brigade	Major General James Robertson	0	2	0	2	This brigade was the first formation of regular infantry in Clinton's flanking column after Cornwallis's reserve force.
4th Regiment of Foot (The King's Own)	Major James Ogilvie	0	0	0	0	This brigade was the first formation of regular infantry in Clinton's flanking column after Cornwallis's reserve force.
15th Regiment of Foot	Lieutenant Colonel John Bird	0	2	0	2	This brigade was the first formation of regular infantry in Clinton's flanking column after Cornwallis's reserve force.
27th Regiment of Foot	Lieutenant Colonel John Maxwell	0	0	0	0	This brigade was the first formation of regular infantry in Clinton's flanking column after Cornwallis's reserve force.
45th Regiment of Foot	Major John Saxton	0	0	0	0	This brigade was the first formation of regular infantry in Clinton's flanking column after Cornwallis's reserve force.
2nd Brigade	Major General Robert Pigot	0	0	0	0	
5th Regiment of Foot	Lieutenant Colonel William Walcott	0	0	0	0	
28th Regiment of Foot	Lieutenant Colonel Robert Prescott	0	0	0	0	
35th Regiment of Foot	Lieutenant Colonel Robert Carr	0	0	0	0	
49th Regiment of Foot	Lieutenant Colonel Sir Henry Calder	0	0	0	0	
5th Brigade	Brigadier General Francis Smith	0	0	0	0	
54th Regiment of Foot	Lieutenant Colonel Alured Clarke	0	0	0	0	This regiment remained on Staten Island, and was not in the battle.
22nd Regiment of Foot	Lieutenant Colonel John Campbell	0	0	0	0	
43rd Regiment of Foot	Lieutenant Colonel George Clerke	0	0	0	0	
63rd Regiment of Foot	Major Francis Sill	0	0	0	0	
6th Brigade	Brigadier General James Agnew	18	47	0	65	This brigade was placed on the British left, near The Narrows. Agnew's brigade served under Major General Grant in the battle.
23rd Regiment of Foot	Lieutenant Colonel Benjamin Bernard	7	28	0	35	This brigade was placed on the British left, near The Narrows. Agnew's brigade served under Major General Grant in the battle.
44th Regiment of Foot	Major Henry Hope	10	19	0	29	This brigade was placed on the British left, near The Narrows. Agnew's brigade served under Major General Grant in the battle.
57th Regiment of Foot	Lieutenant Colonel John Campbell	1	0	0	1	This brigade was placed on the British left, near The Narrows. Agnew's brigade served under Major General Grant in the battle.
64th Regiment of Foot	Captain Robert McLeroth	0	0	0	0	This brigade was placed on the British left, near The Narrows. Agnew's brigade served under Major General Grant in the battle.
Second Line
Commander	Lieutenant General Hugh, Earl Percy	7	44	1M	52	
3rd Brigade	Major General Valentine Jones	1	11	1M	13	
10th Regiment of Foot	Major John Vatass	0	0	0	0	
37th Regiment of Foot	Lieutenant Colonel Robert Abercromby	0	1	0	1	
38th Regiment of Foot	Lieutenant Colonel William Butler	0	3	0	3	
52nd Regiment of Foot	Lieutenant Colonel Mungo Campbell	1	7	1M	9	
4th Brigade	Major General James Grant	6	33	0	39	This brigade was placed on the British left, near The Narrows. In the battle, Grant commanded a division that also included Agnew's 6th Brigade. They made an attack on the American right as a distraction from the British move around their left flank.
17th Regiment of Foot	Lieutenant Colonel Charles Mawhood	3	21	0	24	
40th Regiment of Foot	Lieutenant Colonel James Grant	2	5	0	7	Grant was killed in the early diversionary attack.
46th Regiment of Foot	Lieutenant Colonel Enoch Markham	0	4	0	4	
55th Regiment of Foot	Major Cornelius Cuyler	1	3	0	4	
7th Brigade	Brigadier General William Erskine	0	0	0	0	This brigade marched behind Pigot's in Clinton's column. It was among those surrounding Stirling's force from behind.
1st Battalion; 71st Regiment of Foot	Major John Macdonnell of Lochgary	0	0	0	0	This brigade marched behind Pigot's in Clinton's column. It was among those surrounding Stirling's force from behind.
2nd Battalion; 71st Regiment of Foot	Major Norman Lamont of Lamont	0	0	0	0	This brigade marched behind Pigot's in Clinton's column. It was among those surrounding Stirling's force from behind.
Reserve corps
Commander	Lieutenant General Charles, Earl Cornwallis	14	69	23M	106	This division followed the light infantry in Clinton's column. After flanking the American left, these troops drove the retreating Americans before them, toward Brooklyn Heights or the Hessian brigades arriving from the American right.
Grenadier Brigade	Brigadier General John Vaughan	14	55	23M	92	
1st Battalion Grenadiers	Lieutenant Colonel William Medows	1	4	0	5	
2nd Battalion Grenadiers	Lieutenant Colonel Henry Monckton	12	38	22M	72	This unit was among those surrounding Stirling's forces from behind.
3rd Battalion Grenadiers	Major James Marsh	0	1	0	1	
4th Battalion Grenadiers	Major Charles Stuart	1	12	1M	14	
33rd Regiment of Foot	Lieutenant Colonel James Webster	0	4	0	4	
42nd (Royal Highland) Regiment of Foot	Lieutenant Colonel Thomas Stirling	0	10	0	10	
Royal Marines
Royal Marines	Commander not identified in sources	1	0	12C	13	These marines, numbering 2,000, were landed between 10:00 and 11:00 am to support General James Grant. One company of marines mistook an American unit for Hessians and was captured; one of these was killed by gunfire en route to the American lines.
British casualties		53	228	37	318	
Unless otherwise cited, the information in this table is provided by Fischer, pp. 388–390, or Field, pp. 416–419.

=== Hessian units ===
Unit	Commander	Notes
Mirbach's Brigade	Major General Werner von Mirbach	This brigade participated in the frontal attack through the Flatbush Pass timed to coincide with the attack by the British flanking force of Clinton and Howe.
Knyphausen Regiment	Colonel H. C. von Borck	This brigade participated in the frontal attack through the Flatbush Pass timed to coincide with the attack by the British flanking force of Clinton and Howe.
Rall Regiment	Colonel Johann Rall	This brigade participated in the frontal attack through the Flatbush Pass timed to coincide with the attack by the British flanking force of Clinton and Howe.
Lossberg Regiment	Colonel H. A. von Heringen	This brigade participated in the frontal attack through the Flatbush Pass timed to coincide with the attack by the British flanking force of Clinton and Howe.
Stirn's Brigade	Major General J. D. von Stirn	This brigade participated in the frontal attack through the Flatbush Pass timed to coincide with the attack by the British flanking force of Clinton and Howe.
Donop Regiment	Colonel D. E. von Gosen	This brigade participated in the frontal attack through the Flatbush Pass timed to coincide with the attack by the British flanking force of Clinton and Howe.
Mirbach Regiment	Colonel Johann von Loos	This brigade participated in the frontal attack through the Flatbush Pass timed to coincide with the attack by the British flanking force of Clinton and Howe.
Hereditary Prince (Erbprinz) Regiment	Colonel C. W. von Hachenberg	This brigade participated in the frontal attack through the Flatbush Pass timed to coincide with the attack by the British flanking force of Clinton and Howe.
Donop's Brigade	Colonel Carl von Donop	This brigade participated in the frontal attack through the Flatbush Pass timed to coincide with the attack by the British flanking force of Clinton and Howe. These men, including the jäger corps, were in the lead of the Hessian column. Many Americans surrendered to these units, driven by the British.
Bloch Grenadier Battalion	Lieutenant Colonel Justus von Bloch	This brigade participated in the frontal attack through the Flatbush Pass timed to coincide with the attack by the British flanking force of Clinton and Howe. These men, including the jäger corps, were in the lead of the Hessian column. Many Americans surrendered to these units, driven by the British.
Minnigerode Grenadier Battalion	Lieutenant Colonel Friedrich von Minnigerode	This brigade participated in the frontal attack through the Flatbush Pass timed to coincide with the attack by the British flanking force of Clinton and Howe. These men, including the jäger corps, were in the lead of the Hessian column. Many Americans surrendered to these units, driven by the British.
Linsing Grenadier Battalion	Lieutenant Colonel Otto von Linsingen	This brigade participated in the frontal attack through the Flatbush Pass timed to coincide with the attack by the British flanking force of Clinton and Howe. These men, including the jäger corps, were in the lead of the Hessian column. Many Americans surrendered to these units, driven by the British.
Feldjäger Corps	Colonel Carl von Donop	This unit was under Donop, but not organized within his brigade.
Lossberg's Brigade	Colonel A. H. von Lossberg	This brigade remained on Staten Island to guard the British and German camps there, and had no part in the action.
Ditfurth Regiment	Colonel Carl von Bose	This brigade remained on Staten Island to guard the British and German camps there, and had no part in the action.
Trumbach Regiment	Colonel C. E. von Bischauen	This brigade remained on Staten Island to guard the British and German camps there, and had no part in the action.
Hessian casualties: 2 killed, 26 wounded (all participating units)
Unless otherwise cited, the information in this table is provided by Fischer, pp. 388–390, or Field, pp. 416–419.

=== Royal Navy ===
Although the Royal Navy squadron in New York were not directly involved in the battle, the ships in the area were:

- Royal Navy Squadron in New York
  - HMS Asia (64 guns)
  - HMS Renown (50 guns)
  - HMS Preston (50 guns)
  - HMS Phoenix (44 guns)
  - HMS Roebuck (44 guns)
  - HMS Repulse (32 guns)
  - HMS Orpheus (32 guns)
  - HMS Carysfort (28 guns)
  - HMS Rose (20 guns)

== American forces ==
The troops arrayed to oppose the British were primarily from regiments of the Continental Army, although there were a large number of militia units from New York, Connecticut, New Jersey, and Pennsylvania in the field as well. A significant number of the Continentals had participated in the Siege of Boston, after which they had moved to join troops already in New York preparing its defenses. Some troops had participated in the expeditions against Quebec begun in fall 1775. That attempt ended in June 1776 after a disastrous retreat to Fort Ticonderoga prompted by the arrival of a large British force at Quebec City, and some of those troops were then rushed south to assist in New York. The American defense of Long Island became complicated when Major General Nathanael Greene fell ill on August 15. He had directed the defense work on Long Island, and was thus the general most familiar with the terrain. Washington replaced him on August 20 with Major General John Sullivan, lately returned from Ticonderoga. After sending reinforcements onto Long Island on August 25, Washington replaced Sullivan with the ranking major general, Israel Putnam. David Hackett Fischer observes that the American command situation was "[s]o tangled [...] that units were uncertain about their commanders and not sure of the positions they were to defend."

The basis for this order of battle is a return prepared by General Washington on August 3. It encompasses all of the units stationed in the New York area, not only those involved in the battle. The total provided is a listing of all troops, not just those listed as ready for duty. A substantial number of troops were sick during July and August. For example, General William Heath, writing in his memoirs, recorded that about 10,000 men were sick on August 8, and Washington reported on September 2 having fewer than 20,000 men present and fit for duty. Later returns were apparently impossible: Washington wrote to Congress on August 26 that "[t]he shifting and changing which the regiments have undergone of late has prevented their making proper returns, and of course puts it out of my power to transmit a general one of the army."

The notes for each unit give some indication of where it was stationed, and what sort of movements it made, especially between August 22 and 29, a time period in which there were several significant movements and reassignments of troops. A number of units were moved from Manhattan to Long Island after the British landing on Long Island, and more were sent over during and after the fighting to bolster the defenses before they were finally abandoned on August 29.

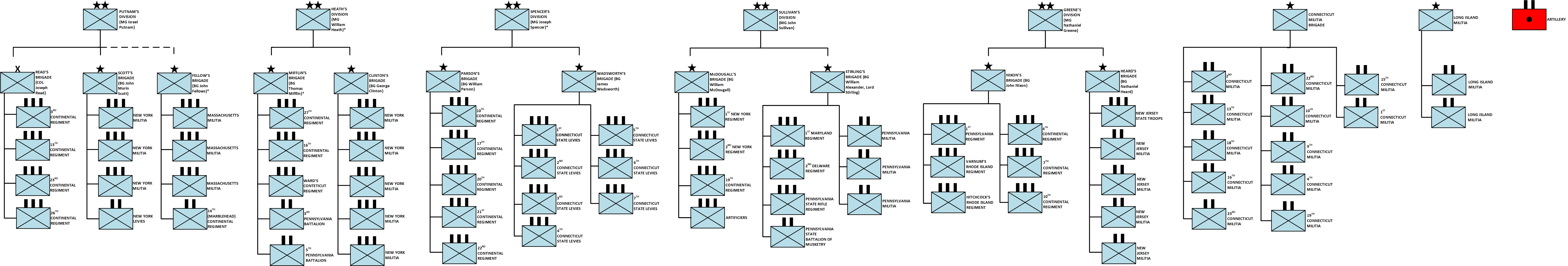
Organization of the American Continental Army

Detailed American casualties are not available because many of the relevant records were destroyed by fire in 1800. British and Hessian estimates placed the total American losses at around 3,000, and a return prepared by General Howe listed 1,097 prisoners, including Generals John Sullivan, Lord Stirling, and Nathaniel Woodhull. Casualty numbers for specific units are rare; historian John Gallagher has compiled a partial listing confirming 1,120 killed or missing, noting that returns for 52 of 70 units under Washington's command are missing. The Maryland Regiment of William Smallwood was virtually wiped out, suffering 256 killed and more than 100 captured out of a unit numbering nearly 400. Casualty figures are listed as notes if they are available for a given unit.

Unit	Commander	Unit size	Notes
Putnam's Division
Commander	Major General Israel Putnam	5,615	This division was stationed on Manhattan during the battle.
Read's Brigade	Colonel Joseph Read	1,997	This brigade was actually assigned to Brig. Gen. James Clinton. Read commanded it in the general's absence.
3rd Continental Regiment	Colonel Ebenezer Learned	521	This brigade was actually assigned to Brig. Gen. James Clinton. Read commanded it in the general's absence.
13th Continental Regiment	Colonel Joseph Read	505	This brigade was actually assigned to Brig. Gen. James Clinton. Read commanded it in the general's absence.
23rd Continental Regiment	Colonel John Bailey	503	This brigade was actually assigned to Brig. Gen. James Clinton. Read commanded it in the general's absence.
26th Continental Regiment	Colonel Loammi Baldwin	468	This brigade was actually assigned to Brig. Gen. James Clinton. Read commanded it in the general's absence.
Scott's Brigade	Brigadier General John Morin Scott	1,527	This unit was originally stationed in lower Manhattan. It was sent to Long Island before the battle.
New York militia	Colonel John Lasher	510	This unit was originally stationed in lower Manhattan. It was sent to Long Island before the battle.
New York levies	Colonel William Malcolm	297	This unit was originally stationed in lower Manhattan. It was sent to Long Island before the battle.
New York militia	Colonel Samuel Drake	459	This unit was originally stationed in lower Manhattan. It was sent to Long Island before the battle.
New York militia	Colonel Cornelius Humphrey	261	This unit was originally stationed in lower Manhattan. It was sent to Long Island before the battle.
Fellows' Brigade	Brigadier General John Fellows	2,091	This brigade was stationed on Manhattan, and did not participate in the battle.
Massachusetts militia	Colonel Jonathan Holman	606	This unit was from Worcester County.
Massachusetts militia	Colonel Simeon Cary	569	This unit had men from Bristol and Plymouth Counties.
Massachusetts militia	Colonel Jonathan Smith	551	This unit was from Berkshire County.
14th (Marblehead) Continental Regiment	Colonel John Glover	365	Glover's regiment, stationed on Manhattan during the battle, was sent over to Brooklyn on August 28, and was instrumental in evacuating the army on the night of August 29–30.
Heath's Division
Commander	Major General William Heath	4,265	Heath, based at King's Bridge, was responsible for the northernmost defenses, on the Hudson just above Manhattan. Most of his units were not involved in the battle.
Mifflin's Brigade	Brigadier General Thomas Mifflin	2,453	This brigade was stationed at Harlem Heights, and did not participate in the battle. Mifflin went to Brooklyn with some of his troops, and commanded the rear of the retreat to Manhattan.
5th Pennsylvania Battalion	Colonel Robert Magaw	480	These units was sent to Brooklyn on the morning of August 28.
3rd Pennsylvania Battalion	Colonel John Shee	496	These units was sent to Brooklyn on the morning of August 28.
27th Continental Regiment	Colonel Israel Hutchinson	513	This unit (along with John Glover's) manned the boats during the retreat.
16th Continental Regiment	Colonel Paul Dudley Sargent	527	
Ward's Connecticut Regiment	Colonel Andrew Ward	437	
Clinton's Brigade	Brigadier General George Clinton	1,812	This unit was stationed in upper Manhattan before the battle.
New York militia	Colonel Isaac Nichol	289	This unit was from Orange County.
New York militia	Colonel Thomas Thomas	354	This unit was from Westchester County.
New York militia	Colonel James Swartwout	364	This unit was from Dutchess County.
New York militia	Colonel Levi Paulding	368	This unit was from Ulster County.
New York militia	Colonel Morris Graham	437	This unit was from Dutchess County.
Spencer's Division
Commander	Major General Joseph Spencer	5,889	Initially stationed in lower Manhattan, some of these units were sent over to Long Island before the battle.
Parson's Brigade	Brigadier General Samuel Holden Parsons	2,469	This brigade was sent to Long Island on August 25, when it was clear that was the British target. Parsons had overall command of the Gowanus Heights defenses.
10th Continental Regiment	Colonel John Tyler	569	
17th Continental Regiment	Colonel Jedediah Huntington	348	This unit suffered heavy casualties: 199 killed or missing.
20th Continental Regiment	Colonel John Durkee	520	
21st Continental Regiment	Colonel Jonathan Ward	502	
22nd Continental Regiment	Colonel Samuel Wyllys	530	This regiment was assigned to guard the Bedford Pass the night before the battle.
Wadsworth's Brigade	Brigadier General James Wadsworth	3,420	
Silliman's Battalion	Colonel Gold Selleck Silliman	415	This unit was initially stationed on Manhattan, but was transferred to Long Island before the battle.
Gay's Battalion	Colonel Fisher Gay	449	
Sage's Battalion	Colonel Comfort Sage	482	This unit was initially stationed on Manhattan, but was transferred to Long Island before the battle.
Selden's Battalion	Colonel Samuel Selden		Selden was captured during the chaotic retreat following the Battle of Kip's Bay. Lieut. Colonel Jonathan Latimer assumed command following the battle.
Douglas' Battalion	Colonel William Douglas	506	
Chester's Battalion	Colonel John Chester	535	This unit was initially stationed on Manhattan, but was transferred to Long Island before the battle. It was assigned to guard the Bedford Pass the night before the battle.
Bradley's Battalion	Colonel Phillip Burr Bradley	569	This unit was originally raised for defense of the state of Connecticut. But in June it was added to Wadsworth's Brigade and sent to New York. It was stationed at Bergen Heights and Paulus Hook in New Jersey during the summer. In October, it was moved to Fort Lee. In November, Bradley was on sick leave and Lieut. Colonel Thomas Hobby assumed command when a large part of the unit was sent across the Hudson River to reinforce Fort Washington, where it surrendered with the garrison.
Sullivan's Division
Commander	Major General John Sullivan	5,688	Sullivan took command of this division on August 20, when Maj. Gen. Nathanael Greene fell ill. The division was on the far left of the American line, and suffered the most from the British onslaught. Sullivan was the most senior Continental officer taken prisoner in the battle.
Stirling's Brigade	Brigadier General William Alexander (Lord Stirling)	3,700	This brigade was sent to Long Island on August 25, when it was clear that was the British target. Stirling was stationed on the right side of the American line on the Gowanus Heights. His command was almost wiped out after becoming surrounded, and he was taken prisoner.
1st Maryland Regiment	Colonel William Smallwood	400	This unit anchored the right against British General Grant's diversionary attack. Some of its men, the Maryland 400, fought a vicious rearguard action that secured the escape of much of Stirling's command. More than 100 men were captured and 256 killed, practically wiping the regiment out.
1st Delaware Regiment	Colonel John Haslet	750	This unit fought in the center against British General Grant's diversionary attack.
Pennsylvania State Rifle Regiment	Colonel Samuel Miles	650	This unit was responsible for guarding the hills at the far left of the American line. It suffered heavy casualties: 209 killed or missing.
Pennsylvania State Battalion of Musketry	Colonel Samuel John Atlee	650	This unit fought against British General Grant's diversionary attack, and suffered 89 casualties.
Pennsylvania militia	Lieutenant Colonel Nicholas Lutz	200	This militia unit was a part of the Pennsylvania "Flying Camp" and was attached to Lord Stirling's force. It suffered heavy losses.
Pennsylvania militia	Lieutenant Colonel Peter Kachlein	200	This militia unit was a part of the Pennsylvania "Flying Camp" and was attached to "Lord Stirling's" force. It suffered heavy losses.
Pennsylvania militia	Major William Hay	200	1st Reg. Flying Camp of Lancaster Co. (Pa.)
McDougall's Brigade	Brigadier General Alexander McDougall	1,988	Originally stationed in lower Manhattan, some of these troops were sent to Long Island before the battle.
1st New York Regiment	Colonel Goose Van Schaick	428	This was McDougall's regiment prior to his promotion.
2nd New York Regiment	Colonel Rudolphus Ritzema	434	
19th Continental Regiment	Colonel Charles Webb	542	This unit was sent to Long Island before the battle.
Artificers	Colonel Jonathan Brewer	584	
Greene's Division
Commander	Major General Nathanael Greene	3,912	Greene was taken ill on August 15; his division was commanded by John Sullivan. It was the principal force defending Long Island.
Nixon's Brigade	Brigadier General John Nixon	2,318	This brigade was sent to Long Island on August 25, when it was clear that was the British target.
1st Pennsylvania Regiment	Colonel Edward Hand	288	This brigade was sent to Long Island on August 25, when it was clear that was the British target.
9th Continental Regiment (a.k.a.Varnum's Rhode Island Regiment)	Colonel James Mitchell Varnum	391	This brigade was sent to Long Island on August 25, when it was clear that was the British target.
11th Continental Regiment (a.k.a. Hitchcock's Rhode Island Regiment)	Colonel Daniel Hitchcock	368	This brigade was sent to Long Island on August 25, when it was clear that was the British target.
4th Continental Regiment	Colonel Thomas Nixon	419	This brigade was sent to Long Island on August 25, when it was clear that was the British target.
7th Continental Regiment	Colonel William Prescott	399	This brigade was sent to Long Island on August 25, when it was clear that was the British target.
12th Continental Regiment	Colonel Moses Little	453	This brigade was sent to Long Island on August 25, when it was clear that was the British target.
Heard's Brigade	Brigadier General Nathaniel Heard	1,594	This brigade was sent to Long Island on August 25, when it was clear that was the British target.
New Jersey State Troops	Colonel David Forman	372	
New Jersey militia	Colonel Philip Johnston	235	Johnston's unit was on guard duty on the Flatbush Road the night before the attack. Johnston was mortally wounded in the battle.
New Jersey militia	Colonel Ephraim Martin	382	
New Jersey militia	Colonel Silas Newcomb	336	
New Jersey militia	Colonel Phillip Van Cortlandt	269	
Other units
Connecticut militia brigade	Brigadier General Oliver Wolcott	4,200	This brigade was stationed on Manhattan, and did not participate in the battle. The unit strengths are described in surviving documents as an average.
2nd Regiment of Connecticut Militia	Lt. Colonel Jabez Thompson	350	This brigade was stationed on Manhattan, and did not participate in the battle. The unit strengths are described in surviving documents as an average.
13th Regiment of Connecticut Militia	Colonel Benjamin Hinman	350	This brigade was stationed on Manhattan, and did not participate in the battle. The unit strengths are described in surviving documents as an average.
18th Regiment of Connecticut Militia	Colonel Jonathan Pettibone	350	This brigade was stationed on Manhattan, and did not participate in the battle. The unit strengths are described in surviving documents as an average.
16th Regiment of Connecticut Militia	Colonel Joseph Platt Cooke	350	This brigade was stationed on Manhattan, and did not participate in the battle. The unit strengths are described in surviving documents as an average.
23rd Regiment of Connecticut Militia	Colonel Matthew Talcott	350	This brigade was stationed on Manhattan, and did not participate in the battle. The unit strengths are described in surviving documents as an average.
22nd Regiment of Connecticut Militia	Colonel Samuel Chapman	350	This brigade was stationed on Manhattan, and did not participate in the battle. The unit strengths are described in surviving documents as an average.
10th Regiment of Connecticut Militia	Lt. Colonel Jonathan Baldwin	350	This brigade was stationed on Manhattan, and did not participate in the battle. The unit strengths are described in surviving documents as an average.
9th Regiment of Connecticut Militia	Lt. Colonel John Mead	350	This brigade was stationed on Manhattan, and did not participate in the battle. The unit strengths are described in surviving documents as an average.
4th Regiment of Connecticut Militia	Lt. Colonel Ichabod Lewis	350	This brigade was stationed on Manhattan, and did not participate in the battle. The unit strengths are described in surviving documents as an average.
19th Regiment of Connecticut Militia	Lt. Colonel George Pitkin	350	This brigade was stationed on Manhattan, and did not participate in the battle. The unit strengths are described in surviving documents as an average.
15th Regiment of Connecticut Militia	Lt. Colonel Selah Heart (taken prisoner 9/15/1776) Major Simeon Strong	350	This brigade was stationed on Manhattan, and did not participate in the battle. The unit strengths are described in surviving documents as an average.
1st Regiment of Connecticut Militia	Major Roger Newberry	350	This brigade was stationed on Manhattan, and did not participate in the battle. The unit strengths are described in surviving documents as an average.
Long Island militia	Brigadier General Nathaniel Woodhull	450	These units performed "fatigue" work, principally driving cattle. Stationed on the American left, it included small cavalry units familiar with the area, but these were not used for guard duty.
Long Island militia	Colonel Josiah Smith	250	This unit was from Suffolk County.
Long Island militia	Colonel Jeronimus Remsen	200	This unit was mainly from Queens County, and included men from Kings County.
Artillery	Colonel Henry Knox	403	
Total size		30,434	
Unless otherwise cited, the information in this table is provided by Fischer, pp. 385–388.
