= Fort Defiance (Brooklyn) =

US fort during the Revolutionary War

Fort Defiance (Brooklyn) was one of the forts constructed by General Nathanael Greene in 1776 to provide for the defense of New York. It was located at what is now Conover and Van Dyke Streets in Red Hook, Brooklyn.

== Construction ==
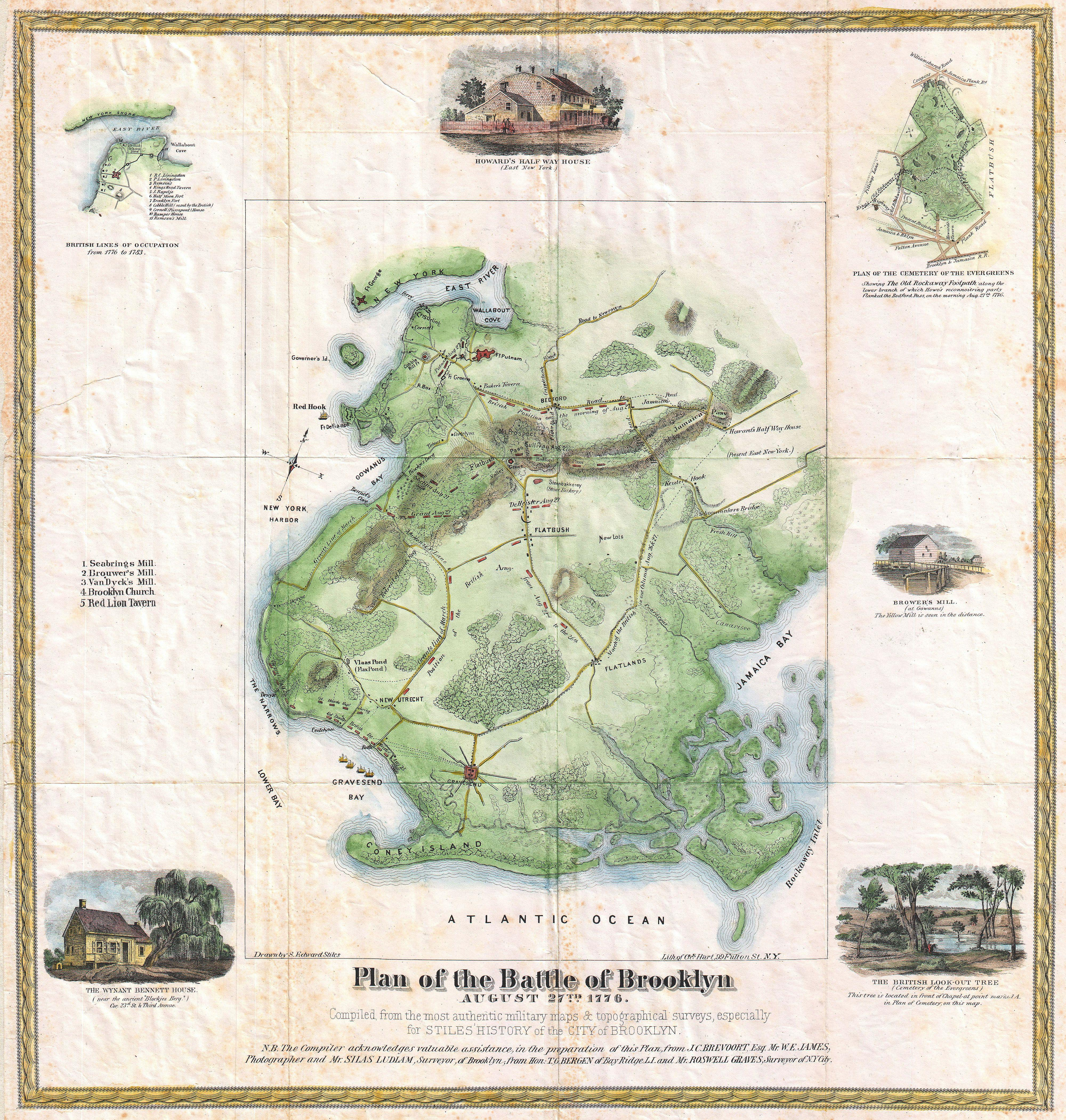
1867 Stiles Map of Brooklyn, New York City, New York - Geographicus - BrooklynBattle-stiles-1867

On August 27, 1776, during the Battle of Long Island, five cannons, a series of earthworks and a defensive wall were manned by colonials on an island in New York Bay. It was the westernmost of forts along Brooklyn Heights, defending the Upper New York Bay from incursion by the British navy. Prior to the battle a thousand men worked under General Israel Putnam's direction to prepare for the invasion of New York, building the fort during one night in April. General George Washington inspected the fort in May, finding it 'exceedingly strong'. The complex consisted of three redoubts on the small island, connected by trenches, with an earthwork on the island's south side to defend against a landing. On 12 July 1776 the first test of the redoubts came when Admiral Howe sent two ships, Phoenix and HMS Rose, to run the American gauntlet by heading up to New York City. The cannons at Fort Defiance fired, as did the cannons at Governor's Island and at Fort George. The ships survived, bombarded the city and went on to blockade the crossings at Tarrytown, N.Y.

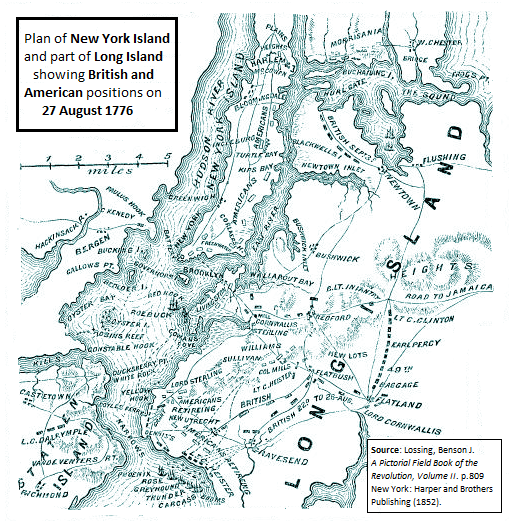
Map marking British and American positions at the Battle of Long Island. Roebuck is shown bombarding an American battery at Red Hook

== H.M.S. Roebuck ==
Early on the morning of the battle the British fleet, anchored off Staten Island, proceeded up the harbor and encountered stiff north-easterly winds. All were forced to turn back, except for H.M.S. Roebuck. Stalled at Buttermilk Channel, it came under fire from Fort Defiance, and returned same. By midmorning the Carronade from Roebuck had silenced the redoubts, but she had been damaged and retired to anchorage.

== Aftermath ==
The fort was abandoned after the war, the embankments leveled, the dredges filled in the ponds and the Atlantic Basin was hollowed out to be made into a protected wharf. The Indian path to the fort was named the Red Hook Road from the fort to Fulton St. By the 1850s, it was becoming the largest port in NYC. Valentino Park has a plaque commemorating Fort Defiance (a stop on the Revolutionary War Heritage Trail) about 2 blocks from its actual location at Conover and Van Dyke Streets. In 1952, a local Brooklyn historian re-located the site of the fort to Dwight and Beard streets, then home of Erie Basin dry dock owned by Todd Shipyards Corporation. In a public ceremony officials from the company installed a bronze plaque on their wall. This location was later proven to be inaccurate - it was likely under water at the time - and it was believed the historian chose the bogus location in order to secure funding for the plaque from the company. The plaque is now lost.
