= Philip Johnston (New Jersey soldier) =

Philip Johnston of the New Jersey militia died in battle at the head of his regiment at the Battle of Long Island on 27 August 1776. He was a graduate of Princeton University. He was the subject of a debate in the United States Senate on 26 December 1836 concerning compensating his surviving heirs and children: Maria Scudder, Martha A. Lloyd, and Elizabeth Johnston.

== Military career ==
He was appointed to the rank lieutenant colonel in the New Jersey militia on 14 June 1776 by an ordinance of the Provincial Congress of New Jersey. On 1 August he was promoted to colonel and was placed in command of a regiment in Brigadier General Nathaniel Heard's brigade of New Jersey troops at New York. The regiment, totaled about 235 men and consisted of three companies from Somerset County and five from Hunterdon County. According to the 1836 memorial of Senator Garret D. Wall of New Jersey, he died "near the side, and under the eye of his immediate commander General Sullivan." Heard's brigade was initially under the command of Nathanael Greene at Long Island, however when Greene fell ill just prior to the battle the command devolved upon Gen John Sullivan and later to Gen Israel Putnam. Johnston and his unit formed part of the guard at the Flatbush Road during the night prior to the battle. After the battle commenced Sullivan commanded an element of about 800 soldiers that moved toward the center of the American advanced position to support units at the passes, including Johnston's. They were overwhelmed and dispersed in the ensuing fight and General Sullivan and the mortally wounded Colonel Johnston were captured. Senator Wall likely inferred that Sullivan was his commander based upon a newspaper account of the time preserved by the family as a keepsake that read:

We hear that, in the late action on Long Island, Colonel Philip Johnston of New Jersey behaved with remarkable intrepidity and fortitude. By the well-directed fire from his battalion, the enemy was several times repulsed, and lanes were made through them, until he received a ball in his breast, which put an end to the life of as brave an officer as ever commanded a battalion. General Sullivan, who was close to him when he fell, says that no man could behave with more firmness during the whole action. As he sacrificed his life in defence of the invaded rights of his country, his memory must be dear to every American who is not insensible to the sufferings of his injured country, and as long as the same uncorrupted spirit of liberty which led him to the field shall continue to actuate the sons of freemen in America.

The day of the battle, August 27 was his thirty-fifth birthday.

== Children ==
At the time of the 1836 memorial to Congress, three of Colonel Johnston's daughters remained alive. One of them, Maria Scudder, had married Joseph Scudder, the son of Colonel Nathaniel Scudder, the only member of the Continental Congress to die in battle during the American Revolutionary War. Philip Johnston was the first colonel of the New Jersey militia to die in battle in the Revolutionary War and Nathaniel Scudder was the last colonel of the New Jersey militia to die in battle in the Revolutionary War.
