= Maryland 400 =

Members of the 1st Maryland Regiment in the Revolutionary War

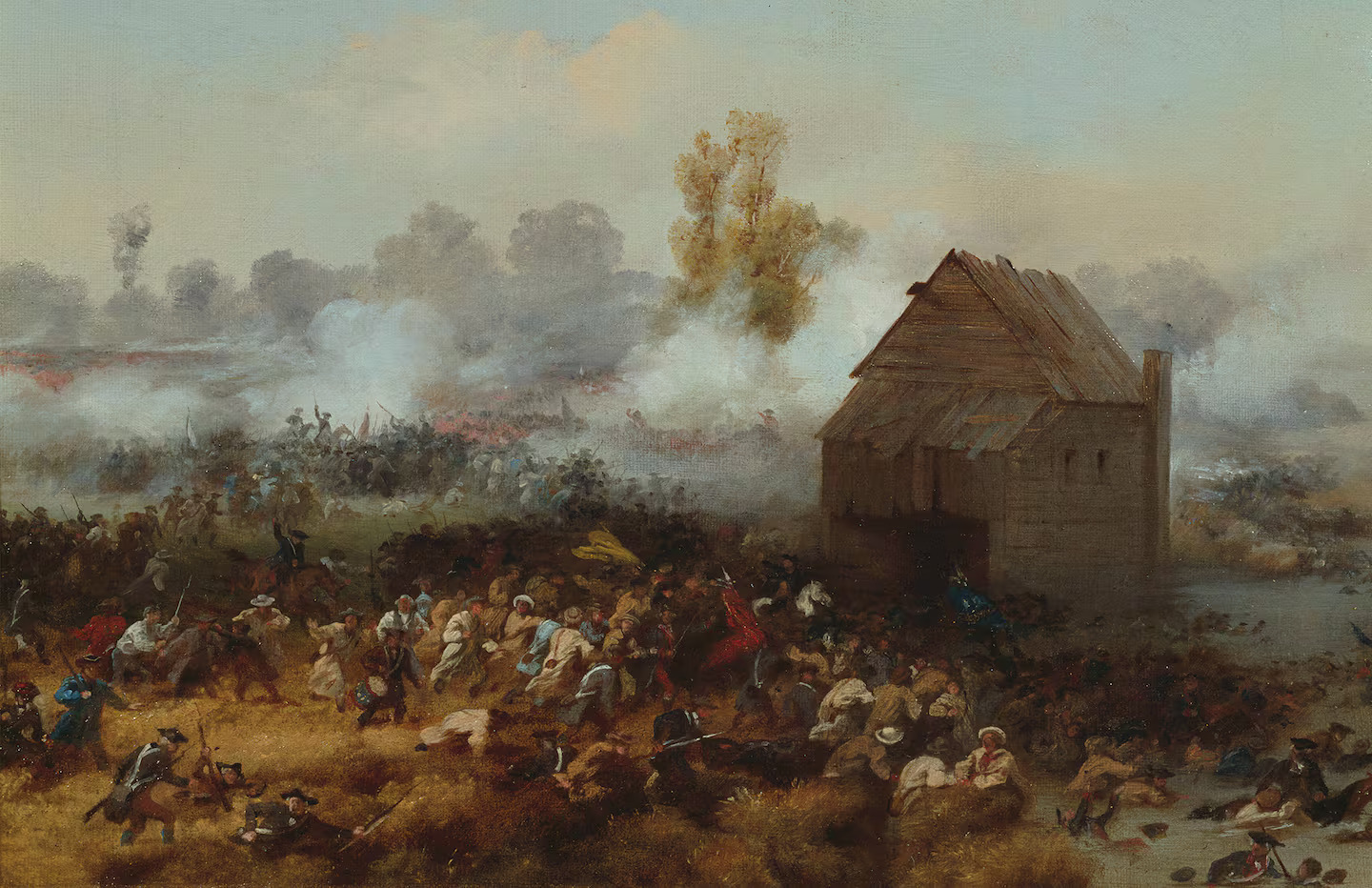
Lord Stirling leading an attack against the British in order to enable the retreat of other troops at the Battle of Long Island in 1776 as depicted in an 1858 painting by Alonzo Chappel

The Maryland 400 were members of the 1st Maryland Regiment who repeatedly charged a numerically superior British force during the Battle of Long Island during the Revolutionary War, sustaining heavy casualties, but allowing General Washington to successfully evacuate the bulk of his troops to Manhattan. This action is commemorated in Maryland's nickname, the "Old Line State." A monument in Brooklyn and multiple plaques were put up in the memory of this regiment and the fallen soldiers.

== Mustering and engagement ==
On 14 June 1775, also the birthdate of the United States Army, militia units formed to protect the frontier of western Maryland. The first two companies to leave Maryland were rifle companies, assembled in Frederick, Maryland in the summer of 1775 under the command of Captains Michael Cresap and Thomas Price; they were organized in response to the Continental Congress' call to active duty. They left Frederick in August and marched 551 miles (887 km) in 21 days to report to General Washington in September to support Washington's efforts to drive the British out of Boston. Later, Maryland militia companies, armed with older, surplus British muskets and bayonets, were formed and sent north to support Washington in New York City.

At the Battle of Long Island, the 1st Maryland Regiment was under the command of Colonel William Smallwood. This unit anchored the right against British General Grant's diversionary attack.

Lord Stirling ordered all of his troops, except a contingent of Maryland troops under the command of Major Mordecai Gist, to cross Gowanus Creek (salt marsh). This group of Maryland troops became known to history as the Maryland 400, although they numbered about 260 to 270 men. Stirling and Gist led the troops in a rear-guard action against the overwhelming numbers of British troops which surpassed 2,000 troops supported by two cannon. Stirling and Gist led the Marylanders in two attacks against the British who were in fixed positions in and in front of the Vechte-Cortelyou House. After the last assault the remaining troops retreated across the creek. Some of the men who tried to cross the marsh were bogged down in the mud under musket fire and others who could not swim were captured. Stirling was surrounded and, unwilling to surrender to the British, broke through the British lines to von Heister's Hessians and surrendered to them. More than 100 men were captured and 256 killed, practically wiping the regiment out in the assaults in front of the Old Stone House. Fewer than a dozen made it back to the American lines. Washington, watching from a redoubt on nearby Cobble Hill (intersection of today's Court Street and Atlantic Avenue), was to have said, "Good God, what brave fellows I must this day lose!".

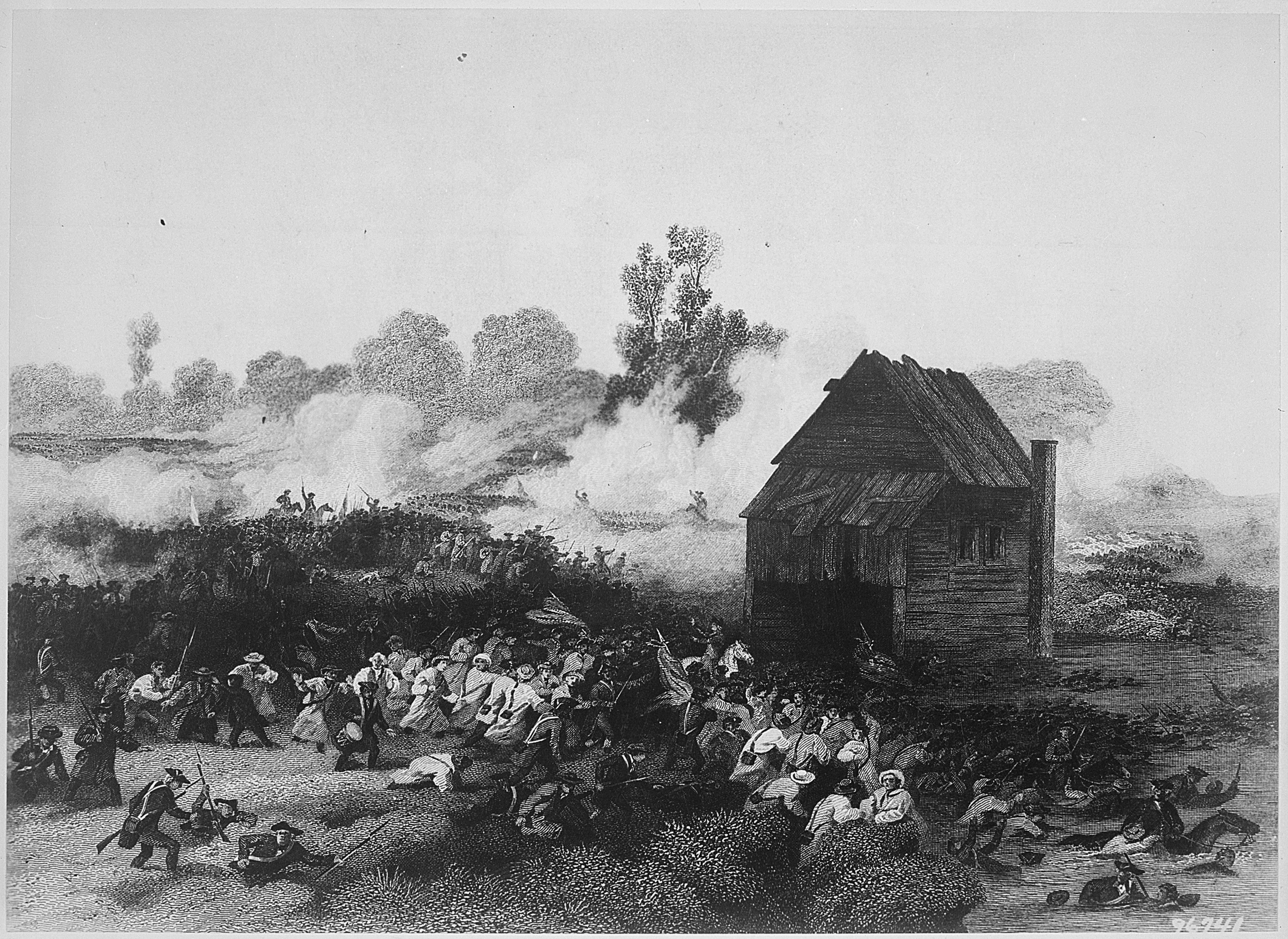
Battle Hill retreat

Many of the officers of the Maryland 400 were admitted as original members of The Society of the Cincinnati or became eligible for representation by a living descendant after the "Rule of 1854" was adopted by the Society as a way to revive the membership.

== Interment ==
=== British interment ===
The 256 dead troops of the Maryland 400 were buried by the British in a mass grave on a hillock on farmer Adrian Van Brunt's land on the outskirts of the marsh. This mass grave is believed to be around the southwest corner of what is today 3rd Ave. between 7th and 9th Streets. In six trenches, the military burial ditches had a north–south orientation so that the bodies would be "facing east".

=== Location ===
In the 1890s, the entire site was covered by 12 feet of fill. Construction was done over the site and it became a coal yard and after that a paint factory. In 1956 Dr. Nicholas Ryan, a Brooklyn Heights physician, is quoted stating that in the 1890s his father, a building contractor, had found "the bones of some thirty bodies in regular, or military order," in the course of digging cellars for apartment buildings on the site at the northeast corner of Seventh Street and Third Avenue.

However, in 1957, the U.S. National Park Service did a historical site survey and a report to Congress identified a "plaque commemorating what was thought to be a mass grave on Third Avenue between Seventh and Eighth Streets." A limited archeological dig by Columbia University archaeology graduate students turned up no remains. A determination was made at the time to not preserve the site.

In 1998, the Archaeological Research Center at Brooklyn College was called in by the New York City Landmarks Preservation Commission to examine whether the Marylanders might be buried beneath the southwest corner of Seventh Street and Third Avenue. Nothing was found. Again in 2008, Third Avenue between Seventh and Eighth Street was visited by archaeologist Dr. Joan E. Geismar in conjunction with the NYC Landmarks Preservation Commission, and no remains were found.

The current location is now believed to be underneath an auto repair shop parking lot in Park Slope, Brooklyn. A group of historians are currently seeking to purchase the property to again mount a search of the site for the graves.

The Maryland Society of the Sons of the Revolution posted an update, Sept 6, 2019 by James Schmitt, where they note that there was no mass burial site. "Rather than being buried, the fallen soldiers remained on the field in the immediate aftermath of the battle. An American soldier noted that “our people who have come in say [Brooklyn’s] fields and woods are covered with dead bodies” a few days following the battle."

== Regiment history ==
175th Infantry Regiment Coat of Arms

The Maryland 400 represented the cream of the Maryland Line, which had a reputation of being among the best of the Continental Army. Because of the long service of the high quality regiments, George Washington, according to tradition, referred to the Maryland units as his "Old Line," giving Maryland one of its nicknames as "The Old Line State."

The 175th Infantry Regiment is a Maryland Army National Guard regiment that traces its roots back to the American Revolutionary War, as the Baltimore Independent Cadets, which later formed part of the 1st Maryland Regiment at Long Island. The regiment's lineage continued to exist through various forms including the 5th Regiment, Maryland Militia, the 53rd Regiment of Volunteer Infantry, 5th Regiment of Volunteer Infantry, the 1st Regiment Maryland Infantry, Confederate States Army, and the 5th Infantry Regiment, Maryland National Guard. In 1917, the regiment was combined with the 1st and 4th Infantry Regiments, Maryland National Guard, to form the 115th Infantry Regiment for service in World War I. After World War I ended, the 115th Infantry was split into the 115th and 175th Infantry Regiments, with the 175th Infantry carrying on the lineage due to the National Guard's lineage being based on geographic location. In 2006, the 175th was consolidated (merged) with the 115th Infantry Regiment and exists in the Maryland National Guard to this day as part of the 28th Infantry Division.

The bayonet on the coat of arms of the 175th Infantry Regiment is representative of its introduction to American arms at the Battle of Long Island by the Maryland Line in 1776, the use of which became famed throughout the War. It is also symbolic of the Maryland 400.

== Memorials ==
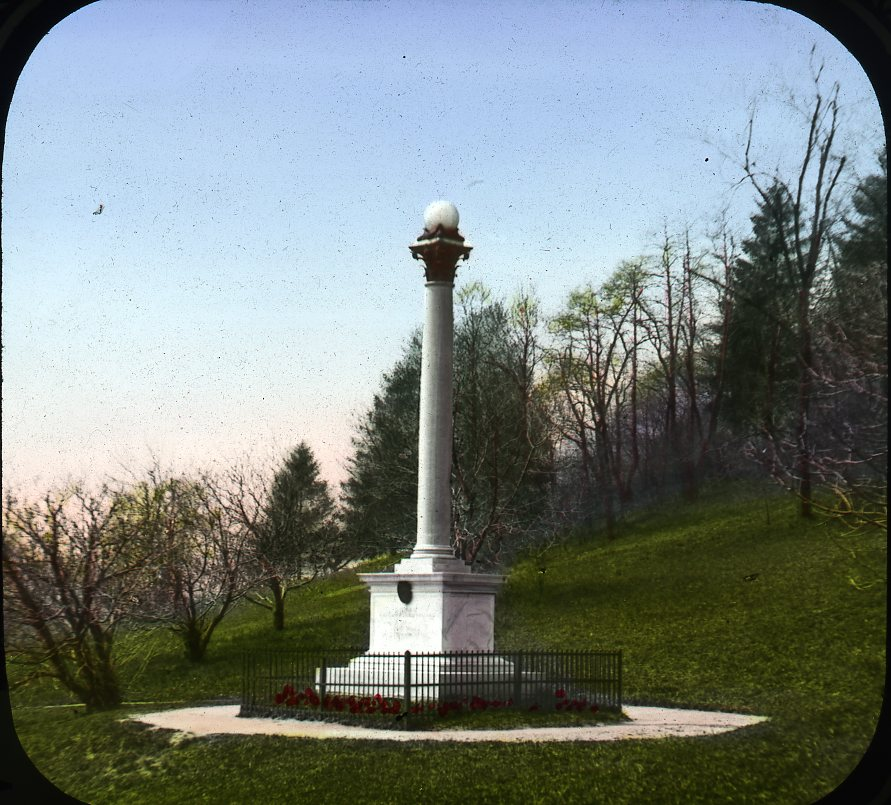
Monument in Prospect Park

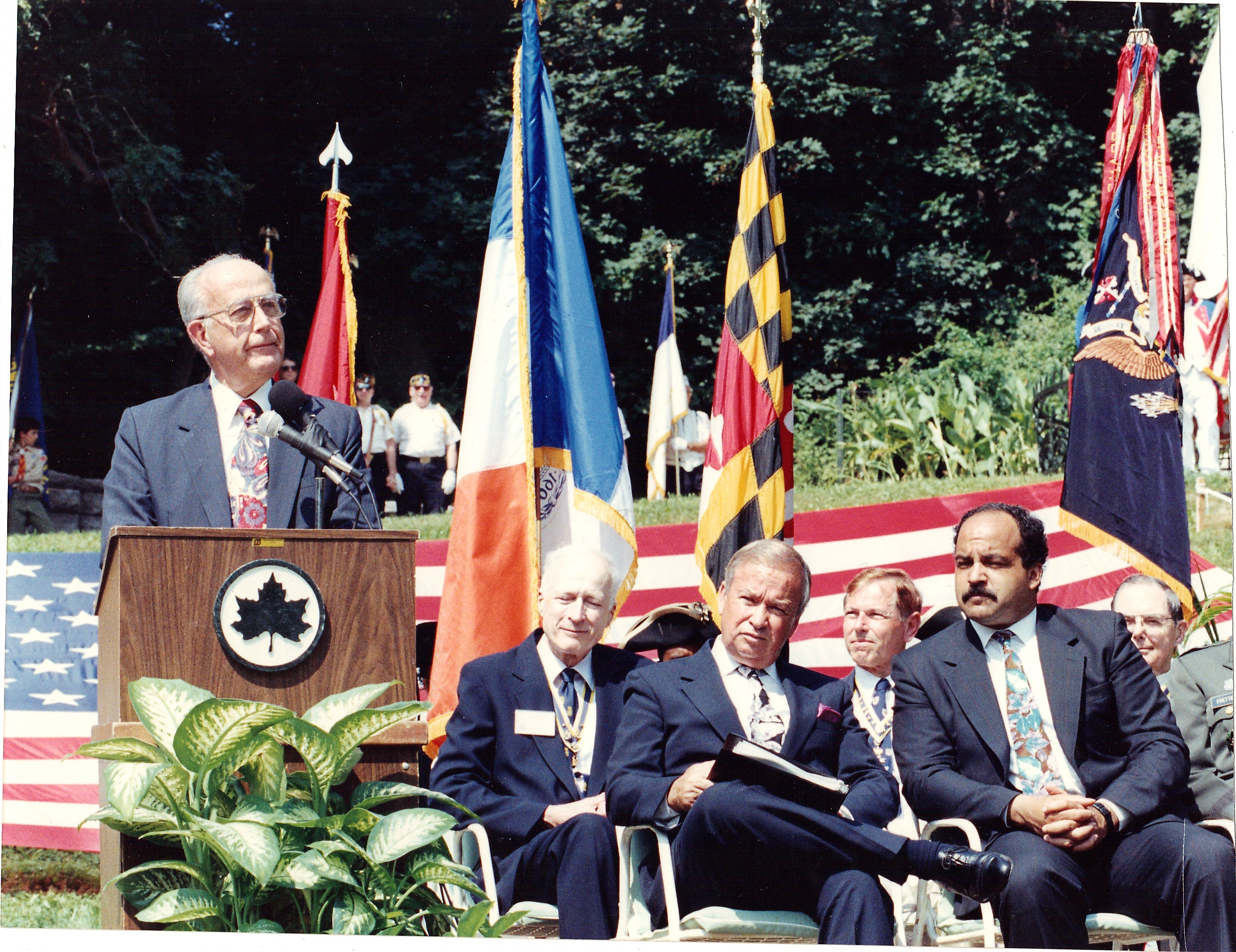
Maryland Governor Schaefer at the rededication, August 27, 1991

=== Maryland 400 Monument ===
The Maryland Monument is located in Prospect Park, in Brooklyn, New York City, on the slopes of Lookout Hill. Originally envisioned by Stanford White, the same creator of the Prospect Park Panthers (1898) as well as the Horse Tamers (1899). The New York Times described the monument as a "monolith of Maryland granite with bronze tablets on the four sides". The monument was built for $3,000, all of which donated by an organization by the name of "the Maryland Society of the Sons of the American Revolution." The monument is 27 feet tall, faces southwest, and is enclosed by a wrought-iron fence. It contains a 12-foot polished granite Corinthian pillar with a marble orb on top and backed by a semicircular stone wall. There is a marble pedestal which was donated by the Brooklyn Parks Department.

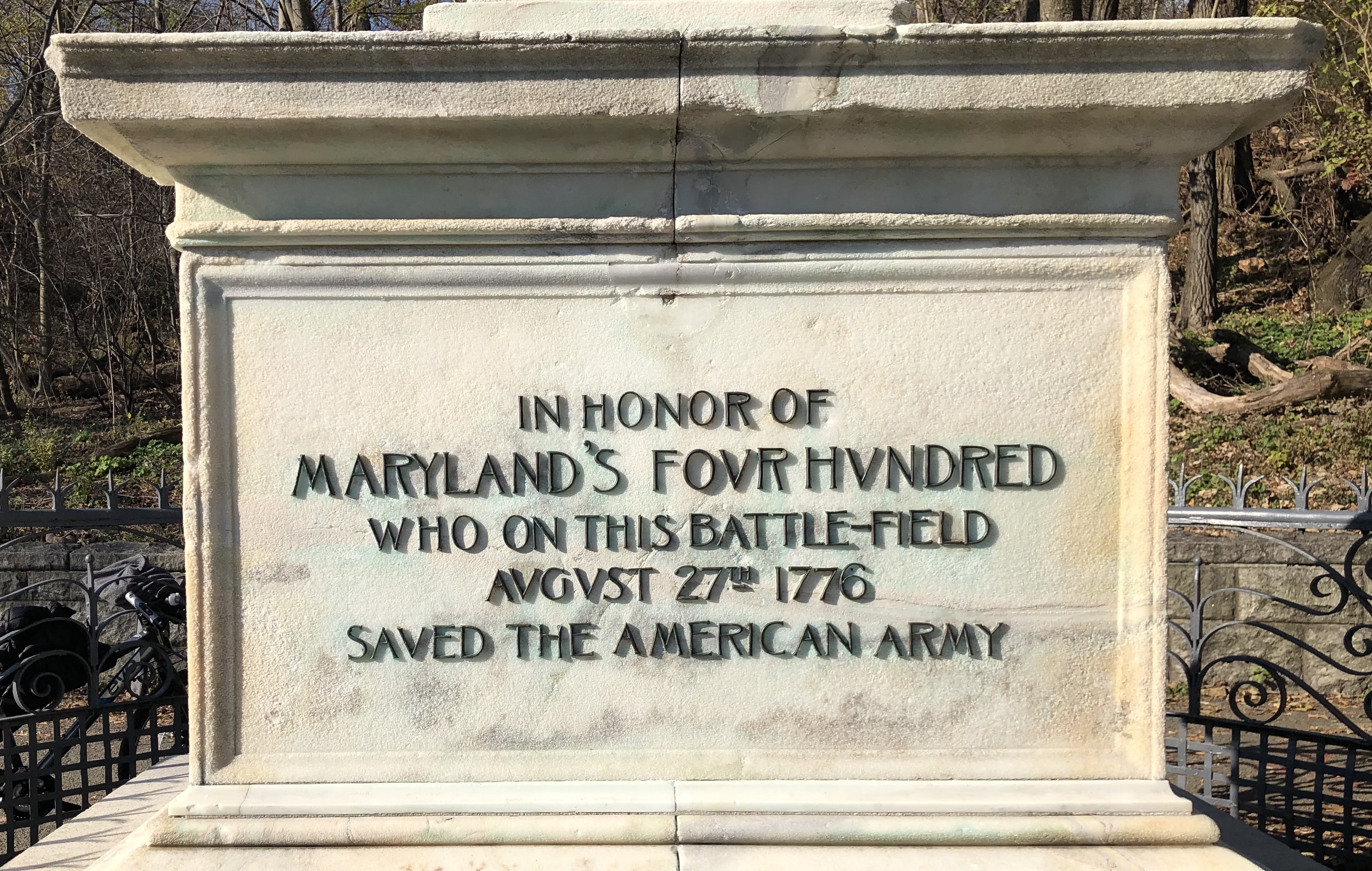
Front inscription

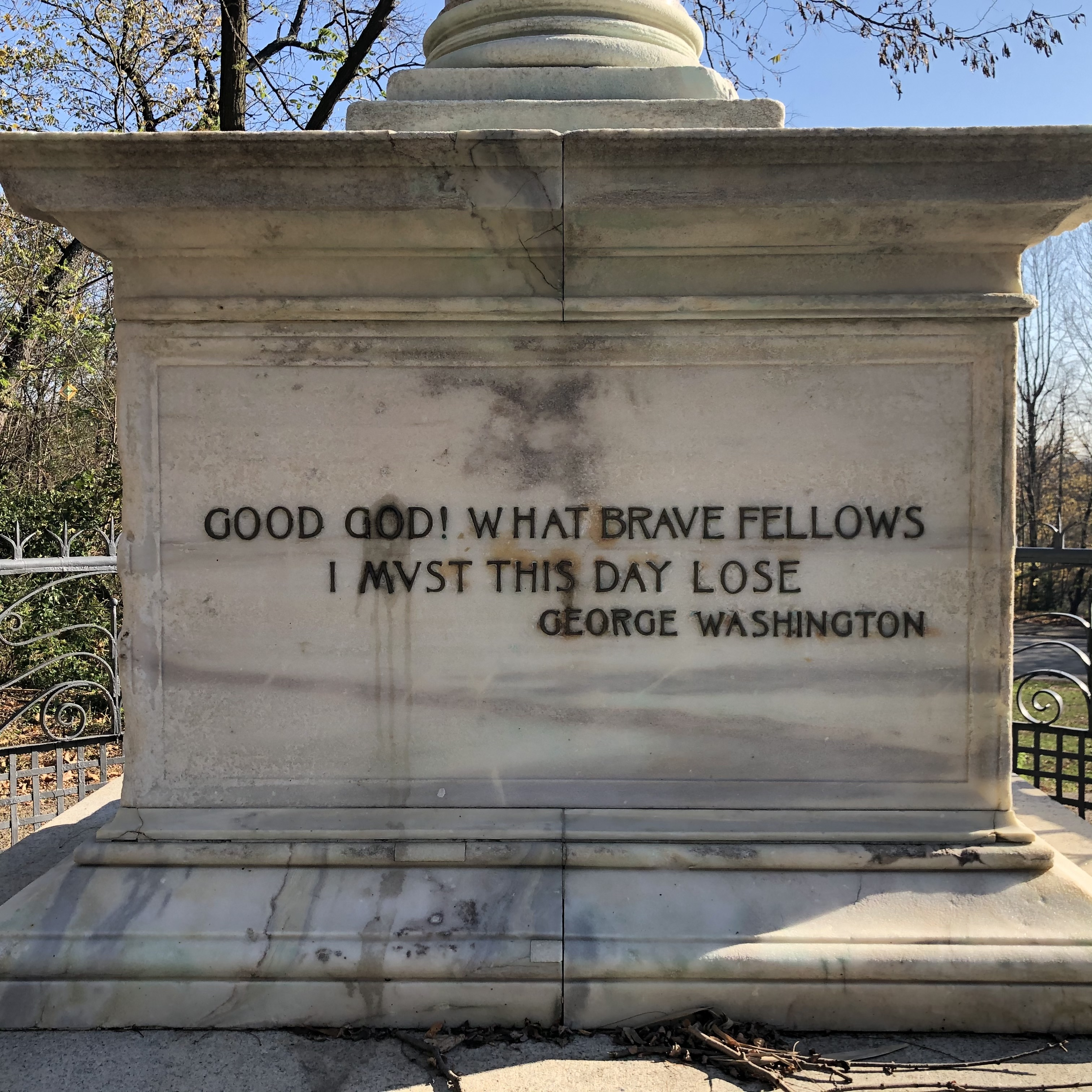
Rear inscription

On the east face of the monument's square base is an inscription honoring the participating Maryland 400 soldiers. The inscription reads: "In honor of Maryland's four hundred who on this battlefield August 27, 1776 saved the American army." The west face of the marble pedestal has another inscription, which is a comment attributed to Washington as he watched the Marylanders hurl themselves at the enemy. It reads: "Good God! What brave fellows I must this day lose."

On August 27, 1895 (the 119th anniversary), the Monument was dedicated. U.S. troops, patriotic societies, the 14th Regiment of the New York State National Guard, and members of the Grand Army of the Republic participated in the unveiling ceremony.

The distinctive wrought-iron basket weave fencing surrounding the monument was added at a later date to protect the monument.

The monument has gone through a number of cycles of being vandalized, ignored and restored. It was first restored in 1935–36 under the auspices of the Works Progress Administration. Additional work occurred in 1969. Due to decay and neglect, raising $35,000 in state and private money, the monument was repaired by the Monuments Commission and rededicated on August 27, 1991. Restoring it involved cleaning and fixing broken, stained and defaced pieces of marble and granite, replacing missing brass letters and refurbishing rusted parts of the iron fence. In 2008, the Citywide Monuments Conservation Program again restored the Maryland Monument, recreating missing bronze letters. Then again in August 2009 work was done. The restoration project included replication of all missing inscription lettering in bronze or synthetic replacements, cleaning and consolidation of the stonework, refinishing of the bronze capital, resetting of the granite paving stones, and repairs and repainting of the ornamental fence.

=== Additional plaques ===
In 1993 a bronze marker was placed outside the door of American Legion Post 1636, at 193 9th Street in Gowanus, Brooklyn, close to the place where the men fell. It states: "In Honored Memory of Maryland's 400. Forever Remembered."

Unknown as to year, a tablet to commemorate the Maryland 400 was placed by the Sons of the Revolution in the sidewalk of 5th Avenue. The bronze tablet is four and one-half by five feet. It has since been incorporated in the north gable of the reconstructed house. It reads: "Here on the 27th of August, 1776, Two hundred and fifty out of four hundred brave Maryland soldiers, under the command of Lord STIRLING, were killed in combat with British troops under CORNWALLIS."

There is a 1947 New York State Historical sign above the front door of the American Legion Post 1636 in Brooklyn: "Maryland Heroes, Here lie buried 256 Maryland Soldiers who fell in the Battle of Brooklyn, Aug. 27, 1776."

In 1897 a plaque was placed close to the actual location of the graves, directly in front of the Wildhack Coal Yard. The plaque was covered over around 1915 when Third Avenue was widened. It was not, however, removed until 2008 when the former Red Devil Paint Factory was torn down and the sidewalk in front of it torn up. It read: "Burial place of ye – Maryland Soldiers who – Fell in ye – Combat at ye – Cortelyou House in ye– Battle of Long Island on ye – 27th day of August, 1776."

== See also ==
- Order of battle of the Battle of Long Island
