= Dutch Colonial architecture (New Netherland) =

Architecture in homes

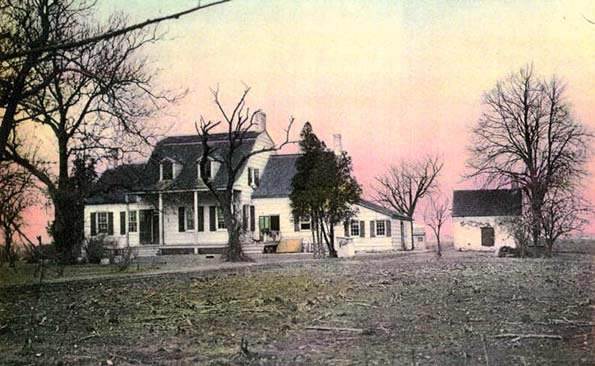
Various stages of Dutch colonial architecture are evident at the Hendrick I. Lott House

Dutch colonial architecture is the type of architecture prevalent in the construction of homes, commercial buildings, and outbuildings in areas settled by the Dutch from the early 17th to early 19th century in the area encompassing the former Dutch colony of New Netherland in what is now the United States.

In the early 17th century, the original portion of most dwellings started out, as a matter of immediate need, as simple one-story dwellings constructed primarily of local available material. When available the house would be constructed of fieldstone such as the Abraham Manee House on Staten Island. The wood for the joists and rafters were trimmed with an adze from trees felled on or near the property.

The ceiling and interior walls when constructed after the initial construction were usually framed then plastered with clay from local deposits, mixed with horse hair for strength, over rough trimmed wood laths.

Common characteristics of Dutch colonial architecture are they typically, but not always, had Gambrel roofs with flared eaves, Dutch doors and brick chimneys built at the gable ends.

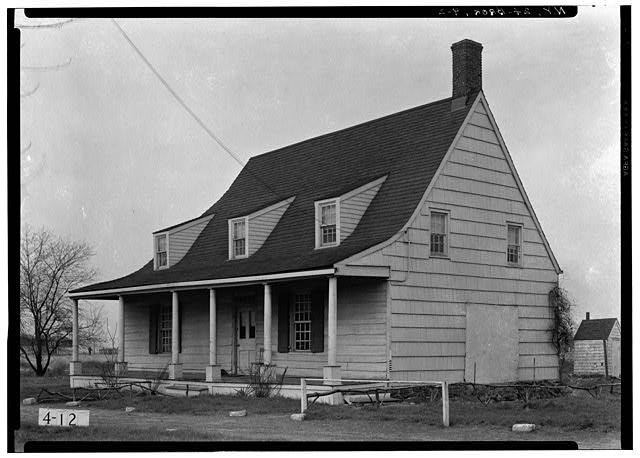
Jans Martense Schenck house

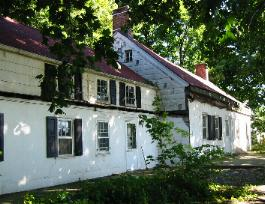
Abraham Manee House

Van Pelt Manor house

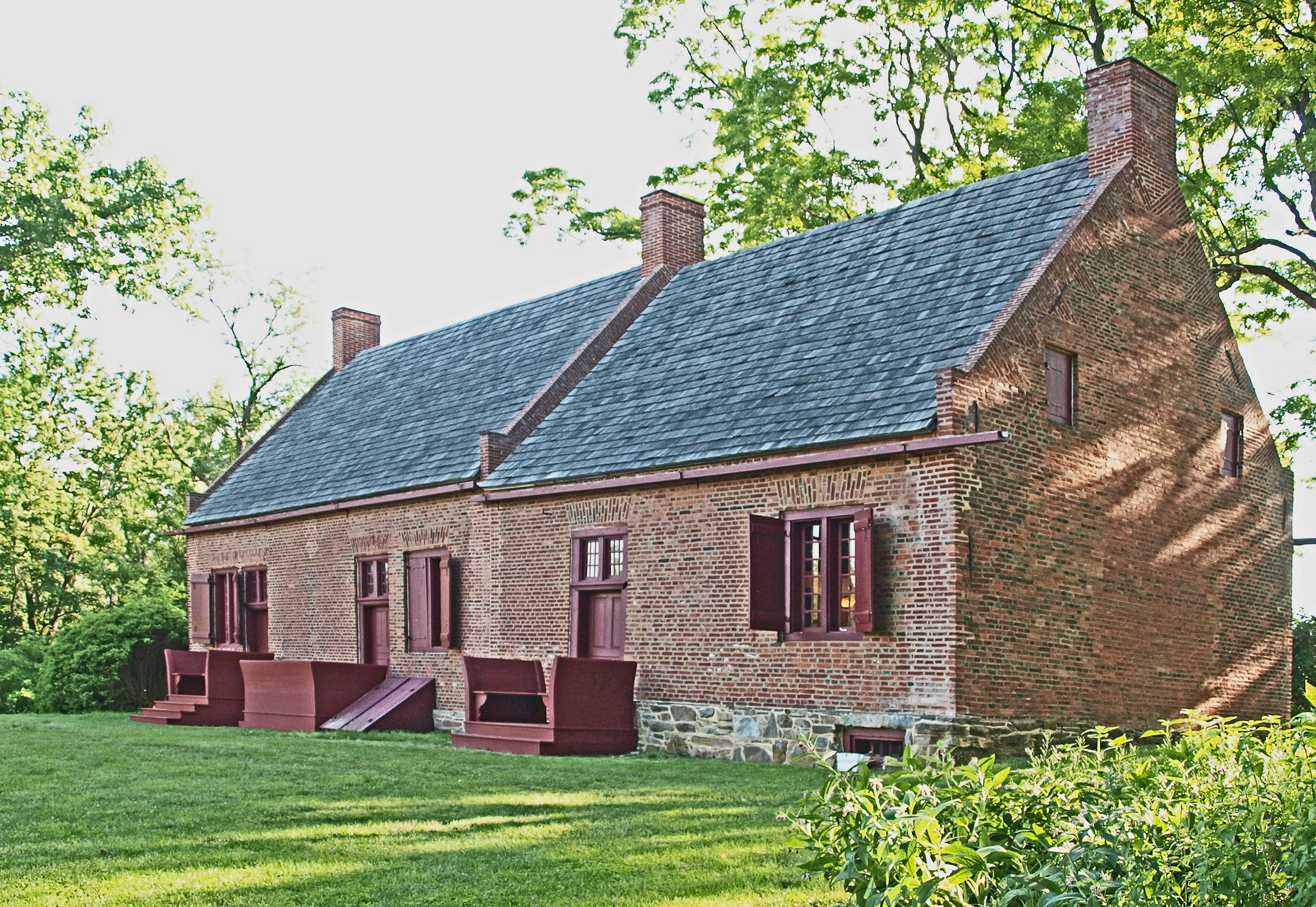
c.1737 Luykas Van Alen House, Kinderhook.

Hubbard House, Brooklyn c. 1830 photograph 1915

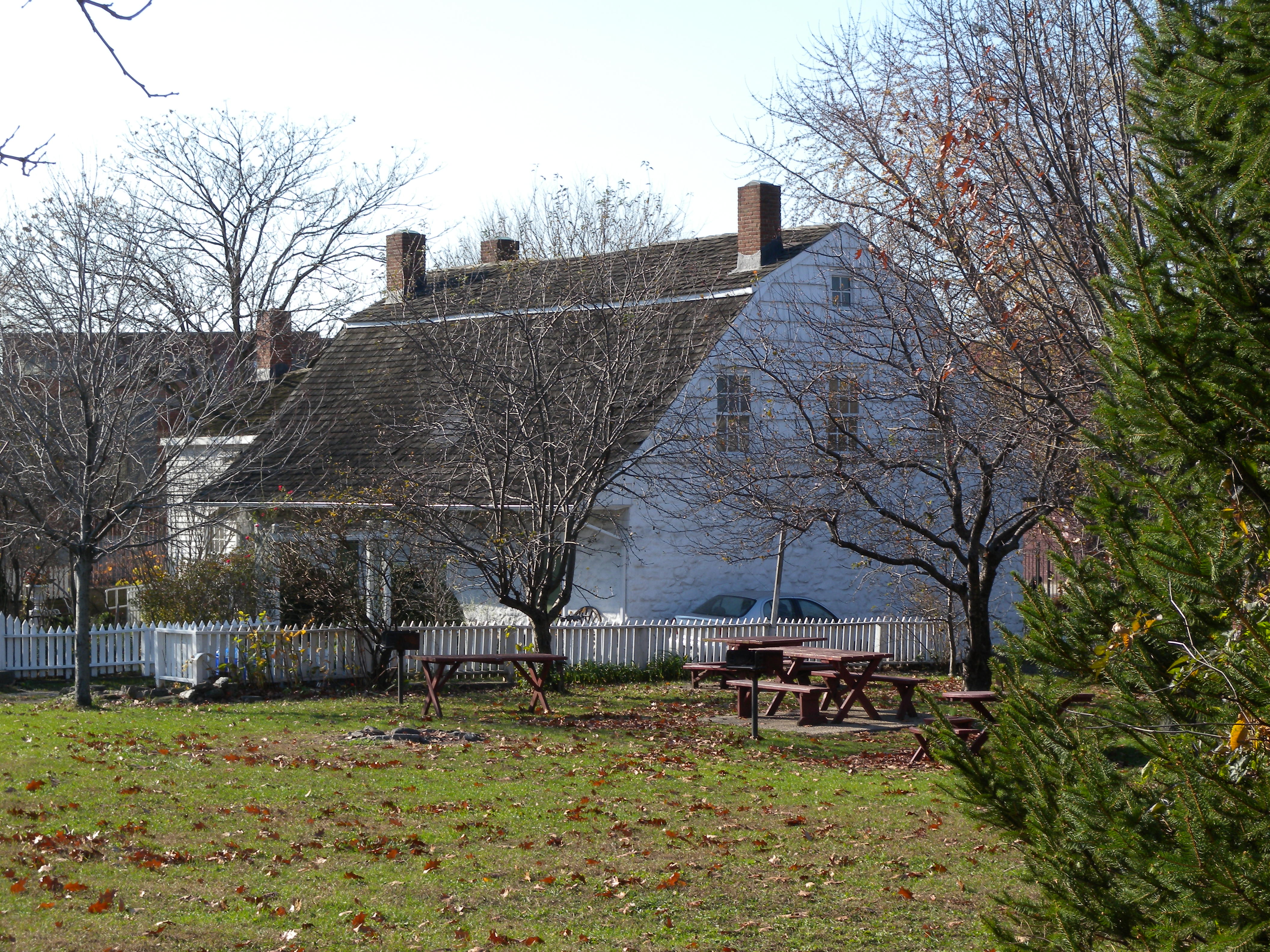
Vander Ende-Onderdonk House

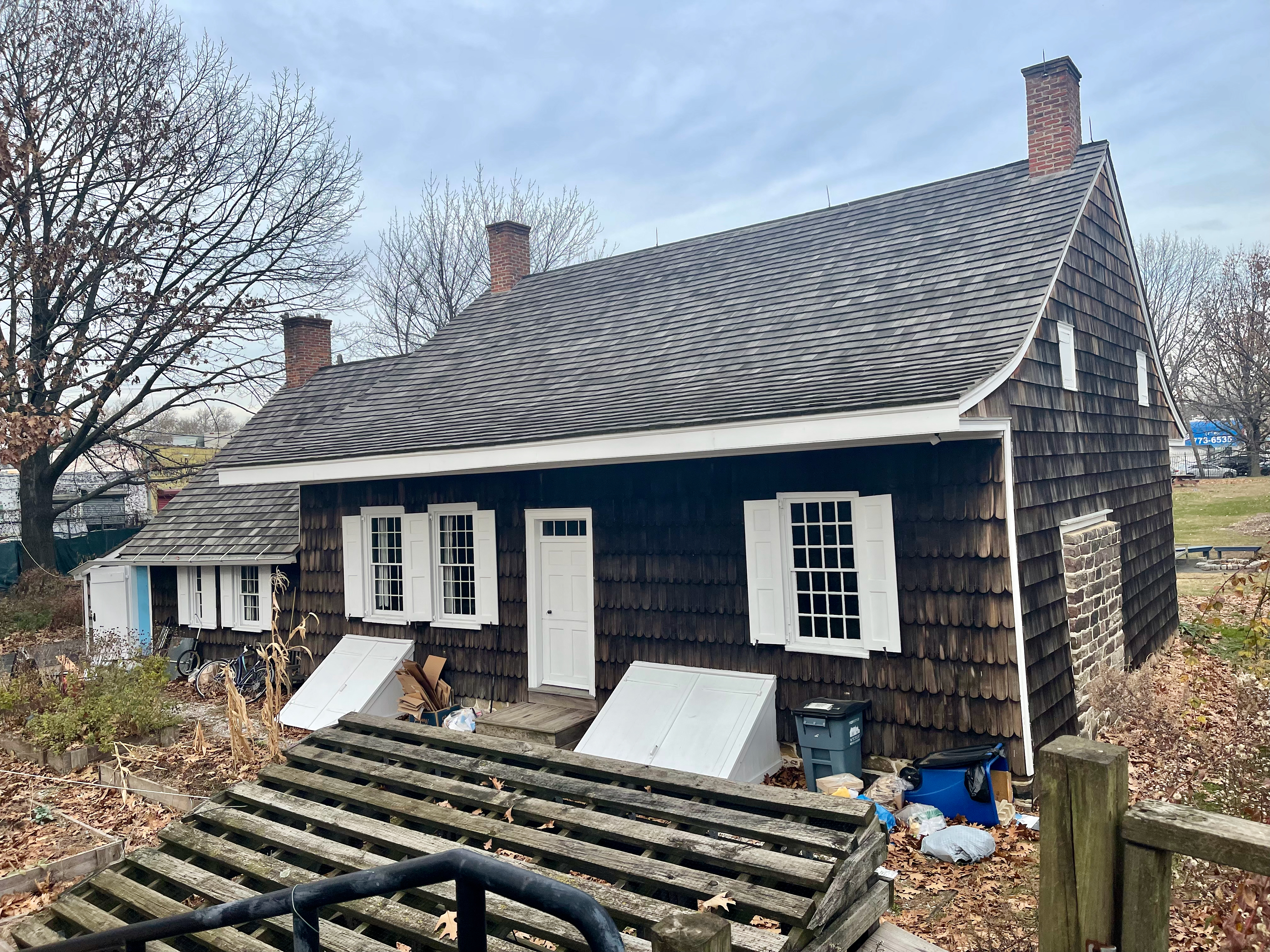
Pieter Claesen Wyckoff House (c. 1652)
