= Samuel Cleaveland =

Lieutenant-General Samuel Cleaveland
- Born: c. 1727
- Died: 1794 (aged ~67)
- Military career
- Allegiance: Great Britain
- Service: British Army; Royal Artillery
- Rank: Lieutenant-General
- Conflicts: War of the Austrian Succession; American Revolutionary War

Lieutenant-General Samuel Cleaveland (c. 1727–1794) was an artillery officer in the British Army.

== Military career ==
Samuel Cleaveland took command of the first Royal Artillery company in India in 1748, the previous commander having died of wounds. He led the company till 1762, and was made major after the British took Havana from the Spanish. Also in 1762, he was moved to the 4th Battalion of Royal Artillery, and served on and off in North America till 1777, when he sailed for England.

In 1781, Cleaveland was put in command of the 3rd Artillery Battalion in England. He ultimately received the rank of lieutenant-general.

== Personal life ==
Cleaveland and his wife Mary had one known son, who fought with his father in North America during the Revolutionary War and was a prisoner of war at Philadelphia in 1776.

The Samuel and Mary Cleaveland letters (1772–1776) are housed in the Manuscripts Division, William L. Clements Library, University of Michigan.

== Sources ==
- Zabecki, David T. (1993). "Cleaveland, Samuel (c. 1727–1794)". In Blanco, Richard L. (ed.). The American Revolution, 1775–1783: An Encyclopedia. Vol. 1. New York & London: Garland Publishing, Inc. pp. 325–326.
- "Samuel and Mary Cleaveland letters (1772–1776)". UM Clements Library. University of Michigan.
