= Battle Hill (Brooklyn) =

Highest natural point in Brooklyn, New York

- Gowan's Heights
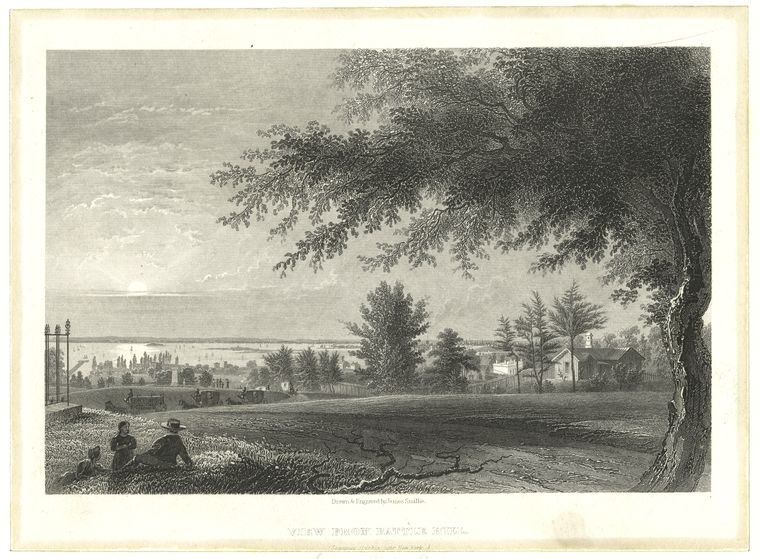
- View from Battle Hill by James Smillie (engraver)

Highest point
- Elevation: 216 ft (66 m)
- Coordinates: 40°39′28.15″N 73°59′16.74″W

Naming
- Etymology: Battle of Long Island

Geography
- Location within New York Location within the United States
- Country: United States
- State: New York
- Region: Long Island
- City: New York City
- Borough: Brooklyn
- Location: Green-Wood Cemetery
- Parent range: Heights of Guan; Harbor Hill Moraine

Battle Hill is the highest natural point in Brooklyn, New York, United States. It was the scene of heavy fighting during the Battle of Long Island in the American Revolutionary War. Its location is now part of Green-Wood Cemetery.

== History ==
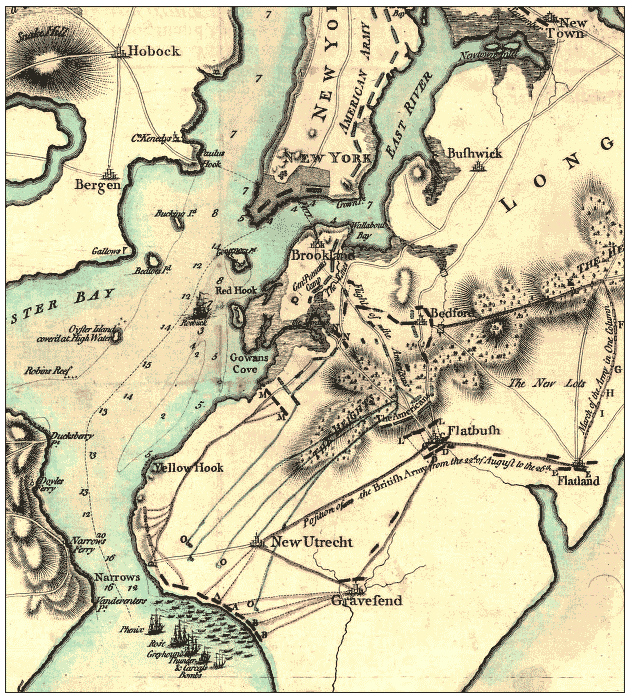
Battle Hill is depicted in the center of this capture of Howes Map (1776), labeled as "The Heights".

Battle Hill received its name from the battle which occurred on its slopes between American troops under the immediate command of General Samuel Holden Parsons and British troops under the command of General James Grant.

The fighting occurred on August 27, 1776 during the Battle of Long Island, the largest battle of the American Revolutionary War. The British attack consisted of three columns: The rightmost, which sought to outflank the Americans positioned on the Heights of Guan; the middle column, consisting entirely of Hessians; and the left column, a second British contingent which marched along the shore. Although the latter was the smaller of the British columns, it still greatly outnumbered the American forces, which engaged with them on the southern slopes of Battle Hill. It was there that the defenders inflicted the largest number of casualties against the British troops. Among the many casualties in the fight was British Colonel James Grant of the 40th Regiment of Foot: When the Americans viewed his name, which was sewn into his headgear, they erroneously believed they had killed General Grant.

== Description ==
Battle Hill is located in what is today Green-Wood Cemetery in Brooklyn, New York, United States. At 216 feet (66 m) above sea level, it is the highest natural point in Brooklyn. Battle Hill, also known as Gowan's Heights, was historically part of the Heights of Guan. The hill is part of the Harbor Hill Moraine, a terminal moraine formed during the last glacial period.

Among the other graves in the vicinity of Battle Hill are thought to be the unmarked remains of British and American war dead from the Battle of Long Island, who were generally buried where they fell in battle. Several monuments are sited on the hill, including one dedicated to Union army soldiers of the American Civil War. Probably the most prominent among them is the bronze statue Altar to Liberty: Minerva by sculptor Frederick Ruckstull, sponsored by local businessman Charles M. Higgins in 1920. The statue, dedicated to the Battle of Long Island dead, faces the Statue of Liberty across the harbor. There has been a community effort to make this a protected view, a distinction so far only held in New York City by the Brooklyn Heights Promenade.

== See also ==
- Battle Pass (Brooklyn)
- Old Stone House
