= Red Lion Inn (Brooklyn) =

Colonial New York tavern

Coordinates: 40.6547°N 74.0037°W

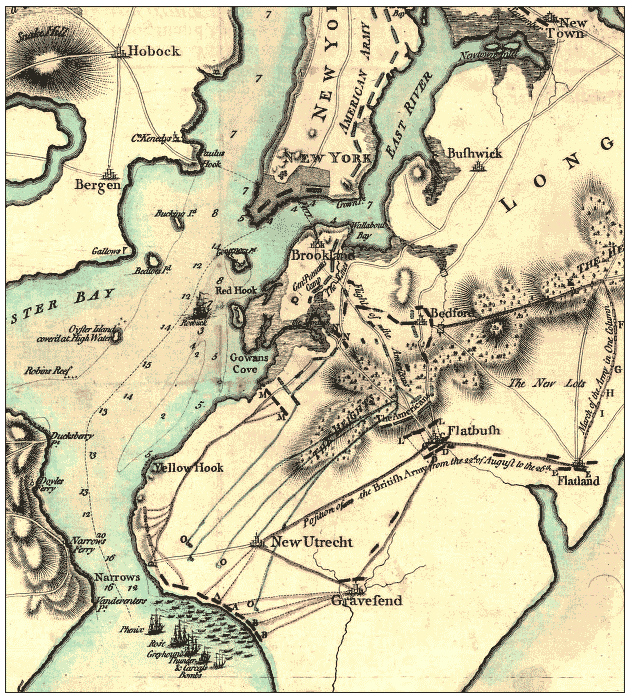
British map (1776), M denotes skirmish line formed by Parsons and Atlee after American retreat from the Red Lion Inn.

The Red Lion Inn was a tavern in Colonial New York located on Long Island in what is today the New York City borough of Brooklyn.

== History ==
The inn, named in honor of Henry V of England for the tavern he rested in after the Battle of Agincourt, was at the junction of three country roads: the Narrows Road which led north from Denyse's Ferry; Martense Lane which passed through the Heights of Guan to Flatbush, and the Gowanus Road which led to Brooklyn Heights: this colonial era juncture is the modern day location of Fourth Avenue and 35th Street.

In the early morning hours of August 27, 1776, the first shots of the Battle of Brooklyn were fired here when British troops under Major General James Grant encountered American pickets stationed at the Red Lion. According to some accounts the British troops were foraging in a watermelon patch. After an initial exchange of musket fire, the Americans retreated in a panic up the Gowanus Road toward the Vechte house. Major Edward Burd who had been in command was captured along with a lieutenant and 15 privates.

Samuel Holden Parsons a lawyer from Connecticut who had secured a commission in the Continental Army and was recently promoted to Brigadier General was Field Officer of the Day. He and Colonel Samuel John Atlee of Pennsylvania, a veteran of the French and Indian War were stationed further north on the Gowanus Road. The two colonels roused from their sleep by the sound of musket fire managed to intercept some of the troops fleeing from the British at the Red Lion and form them into a skirmish line. They also sent word to Major General Israel Putnam at Brooklyn that the enemy was advancing. At three o'clock General Putnam informed Brigadier General (William Alexander) Lord Stirling and directed him to meet the enemy. Stirling set out with the available companies of the Maryland and Delaware regiments. Stirling's force, totaling about 1,500 men, encountered the British within a half mile of the Red Lion and formed for battle. At daybreak Stirling and Parsons would be reinforced with 400 troops sent by General John Sullivan from those near the Flatbush Pass. The reinforcements brought the total American strength up to 2,100 troops under Lord Stirling's command. The British troops under General Grant, also being reinforced, would reach over 7,000 troops. Stirling's force stood firm under British cannon and musket fire for about four hours. At that point Grant advanced his forces and Stirling gradually fell back along the Gowanus Road toward Brooklyn. Other British forces under General Charles Earl Cornwallis and Hessians under General Leopold Philip de Heister were already in Stirling's rear and his force began to come apart as they encountered other American units fleeing west over the fields and along the Port Road to cross the Gowanus marshes to the safety of the main American defensive line at Brooklyn.

In the fighting near the Old Stone House and Brouwer's Mills, one battalion of 400 troops from Colonel William Smallwood's 1st Maryland Regiment led by Major Mordecai Gist and still under Lord Stirling's command, would engage these 2,000 British and Hessian troops to cover the thousands of Americans retreating across the marshes and Gowanus creek. During other nearby fighting, Colonel Atlee was captured by the British and General Parsons was eventually able to escape to the American lines.
