= Wyckoff-Bennett Homestead =

Historic house in Brooklyn, New York

- U.S. National Register of Historic Places
- U.S. National Historic Landmark
- New York State Register of Historic Places
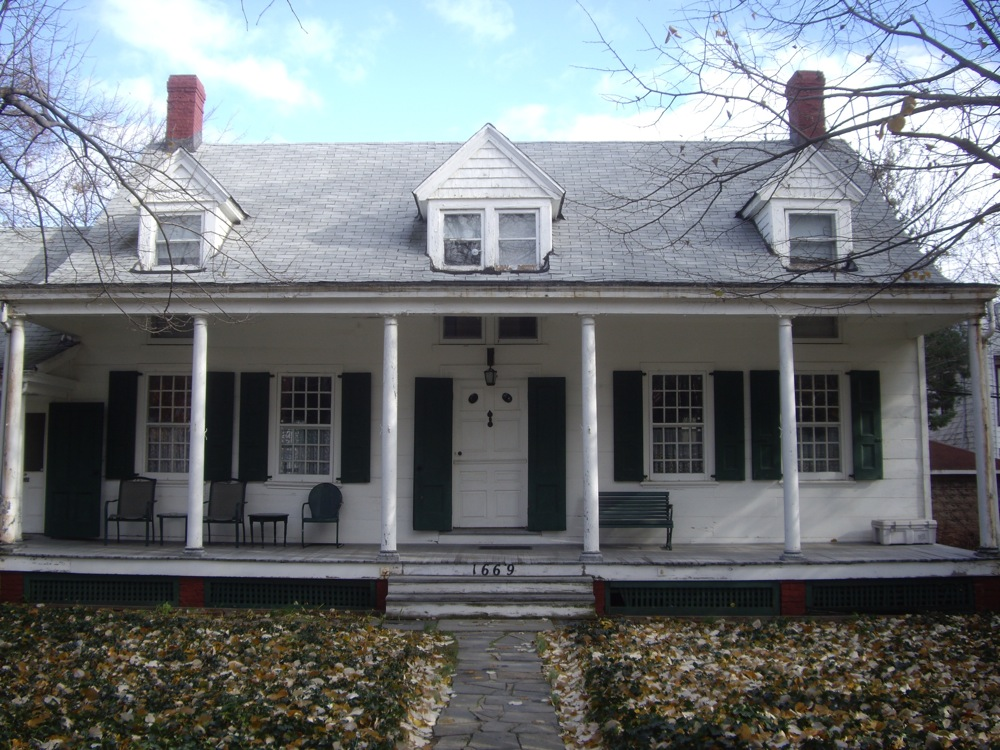

- Location within New York City Location within New York Location within the United States
- Location: 1669 East 22nd Street, Brooklyn, New York
- Coordinates: 40°36.65′0″N 73°57.08′0″W
- Built: c.1766
- Architectural style: Dutch Colonial
- NRHP reference No.: 74001253
- NYSRHP No.: 04701.000006

Significant dates
- Added to NRHP: December 24, 1974
- Designated NHL: December 8, 1976
- Designated NYSRHP: June 23, 1980

The Wyckoff-Bennett Homestead in Flatlands, Brooklyn, New York City, is a National Historic Landmark. It is believed to have been built before 1766. During the American Revolution it housed Hessian soldiers, two of whom, Captain Toepfer of the Ditfourth regiment and Lieut. M. Bach of the Hessen-Hanau Artillerie, scratched their names and units into windowpanes. It was declared a National Historic Landmark in 1976. It is part of the New York State Revolutionary War Heritage Trail.

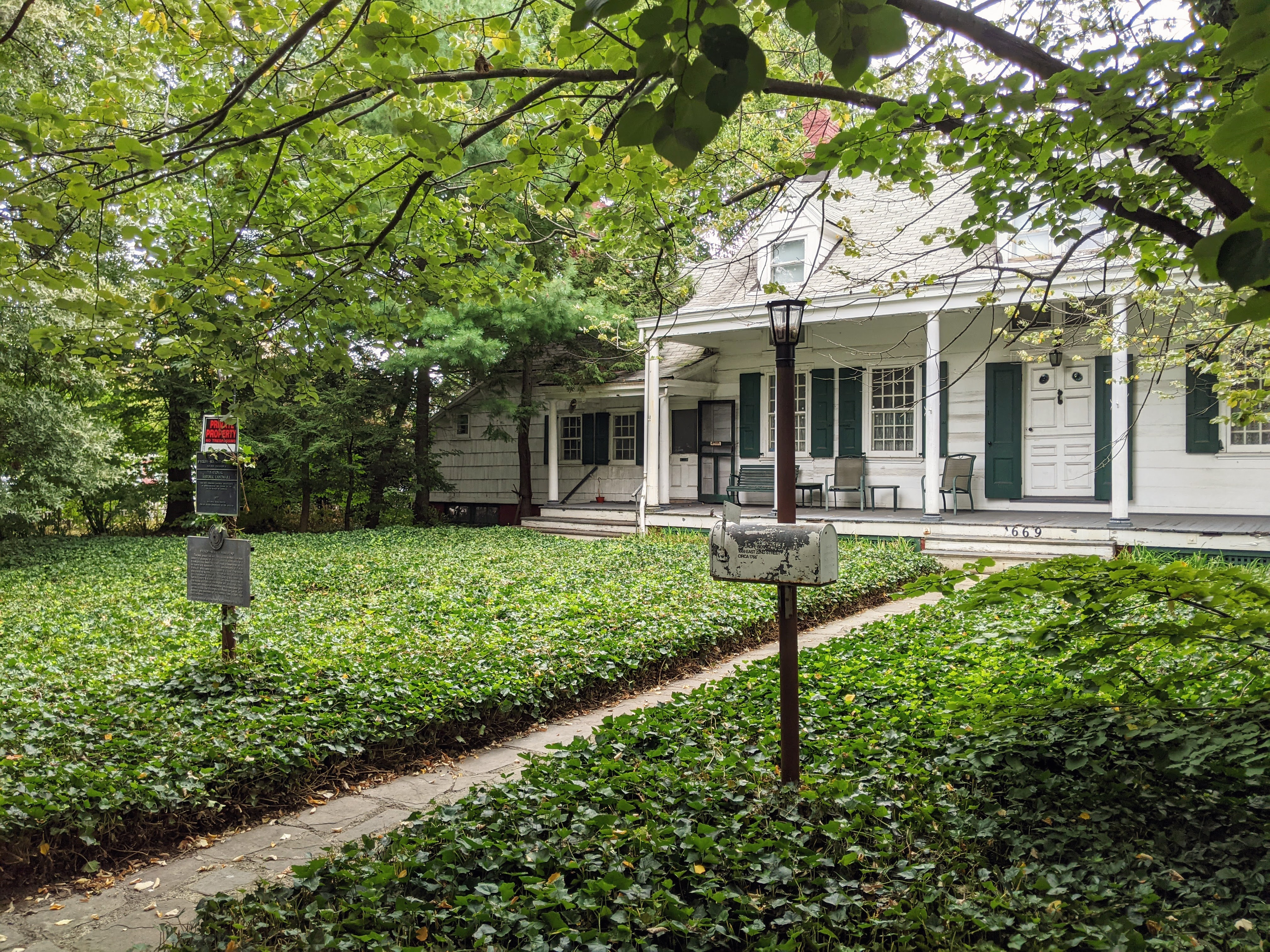
Wyckoff-Bennett Homestead August 21, 2021

It was owned and occupied by the Wyckoff Family from when it was built, by Hendrick H. Wyckoff, in approximately 1766, until 1835 when Cornelius W. Bennett purchased it and the approximately 100 acre farm. Four generations of the Bennett family lived in the home until the death of Gertrude Ryder Bennett Williams in 1982, after which her widower, Rev. Frank Curtis Williams, sold the home to Annette and Stuart Mont.

The property is one of the last privately owned Dutch Colonial farmhouses in New York City. In 1975 Gertrude Ryder Bennett Williams had sought to deed the property to the National Trust for Historic Preservation, but the government failed to complete the acquisition. The Monts also sought to have the house preserved and had reached a deal with the city in 1999 for $2 million, which included the Monts remaining on the property as caretakers, rent-free, and gave the city the right of first refusal for sale of any of the contents. However, after years of proceedings, including public meetings, the re-mapping of the property as parkland (it was to be a Parks Department acquisition), approval by the local Community Board (which lowered the value of the deal by requiring the $2 million purchase price to include the contents of the house), and inclusion of the earmarked funds in the 2003-2004 city budget, the deal never came to fruition. When the Department of Citywide Administrative Services (DCAS) had the paperwork drawn up the price was reconfigured at $1.3 million, with city deducting $600,000 for rent at $40 thousand a year for an estimated 15 years of remaining lifespan for the Monts. The Monts declined to accept the new terms. Following their deaths, their heirs put the home up for sale in 2020, initially seeking $3.25 million. In 2022 they ultimately accepted an offer of $2.4 million from "22nd Street Investors LLC", which shares an address with Avraham Dishi.

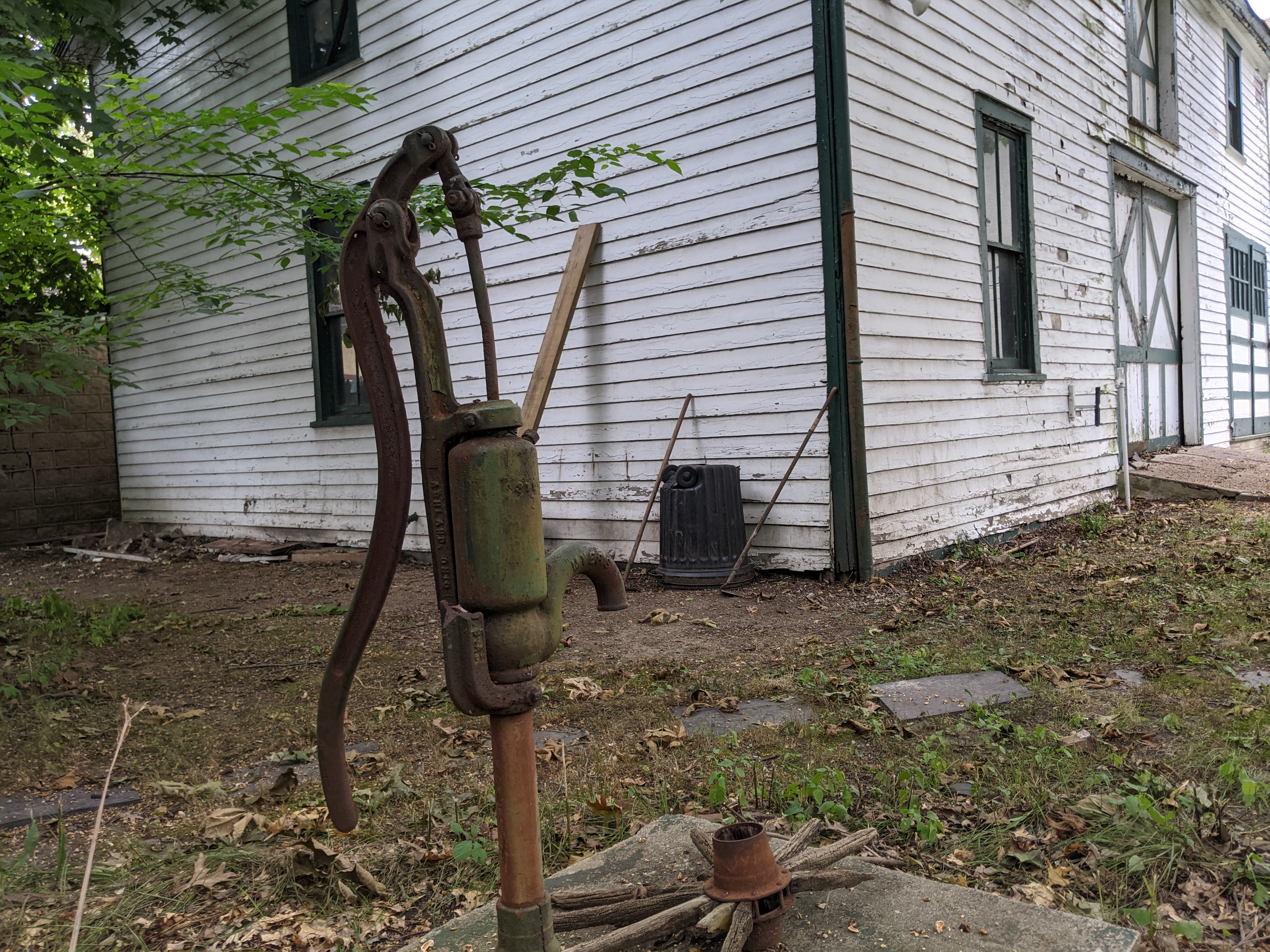
Wyckoff-Bennett Homestead Waterpump & Barn

A plaque outside the homestead says:

This Dutch-American farmhouse is a quiet reminder that the Battle of Brooklyn, one of the biggest conflicts of the Revolutionary War, took place when Kings County was still mostly farm country. The county boasted fewer than 4,000 inhabitants, one third of whom were slaves working on land owned by families descended from 17th-century Dutch immigrants. Hendrick Wyckoff built the house in 1766. The site he chose lay along Kings Highway, then the county's main east-west artery. After the British invasion in 1776, Hessian soldiers were quartered here. Several of them left their mark by etching their names and rank on window panes among them Toepfer Captain Regt. De Ditrurth and "M. Bach Lieutenant V. Hessen Hanau Artillerie's". When the Battle of Brooklyn began on August 27, 1776, these men may well have taken part in the attack that drove American defenders from the Battle Pass, in what is now Prospect Park, and nearly destroyed the army under command of George Washington.

On October 14, 2021, the entire property was sold for $2.4 million dollars to "22nd Street Investors" according to City records.

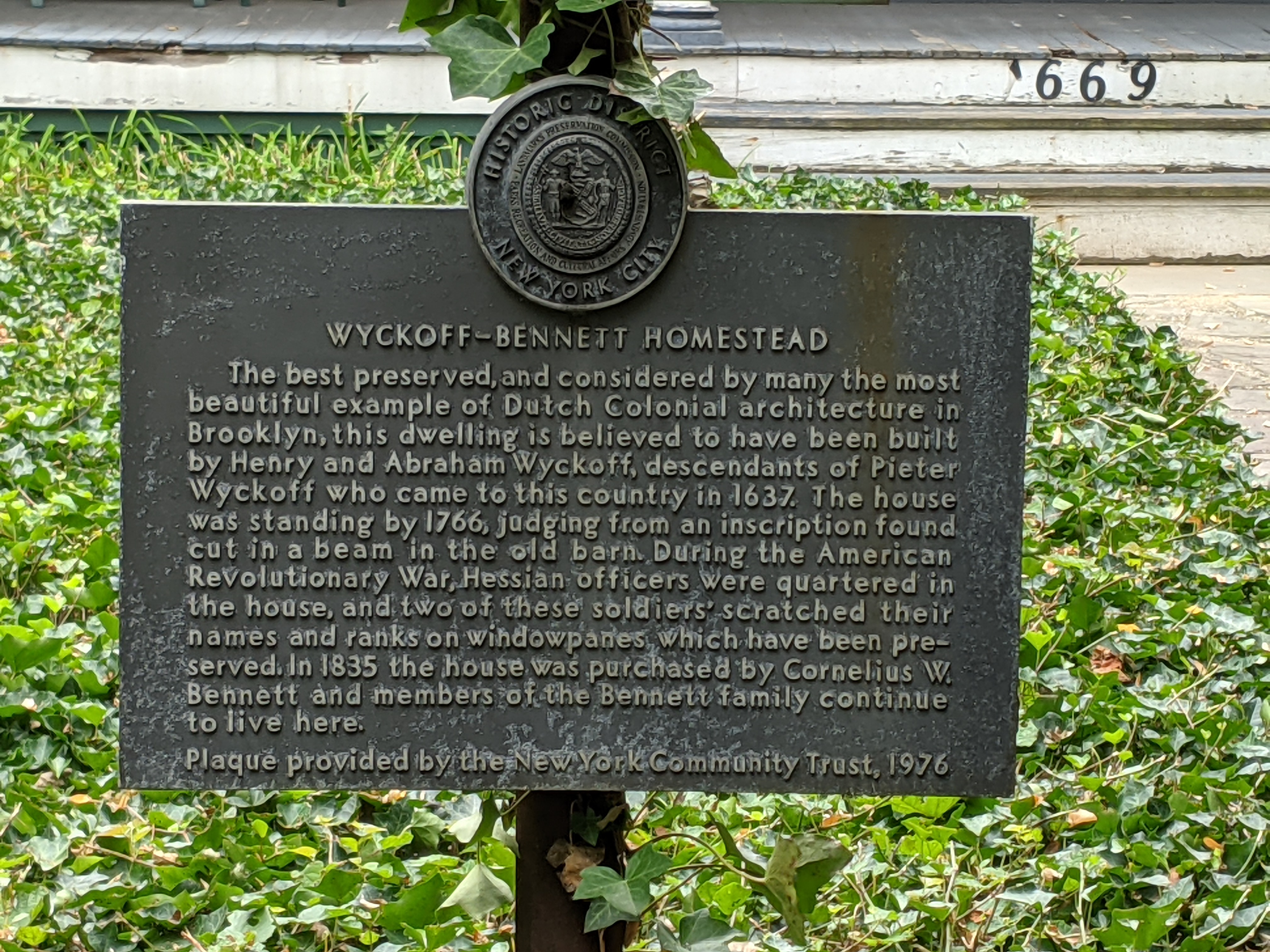
Historic District marker

In December of 2024, the property was sold to Congregation Chabad Lubavitch of Flatbush.

== See also ==
- Wyckoff House, another historic house in Brooklyn
- Oldest buildings in America
- List of National Historic Landmarks in New York City
- National Register of Historic Places listings in Brooklyn
