= Battle Pass (Brooklyn) =

Historic pass in Brooklyn, New York

Coordinates: 40.6661°N 73.9665°W

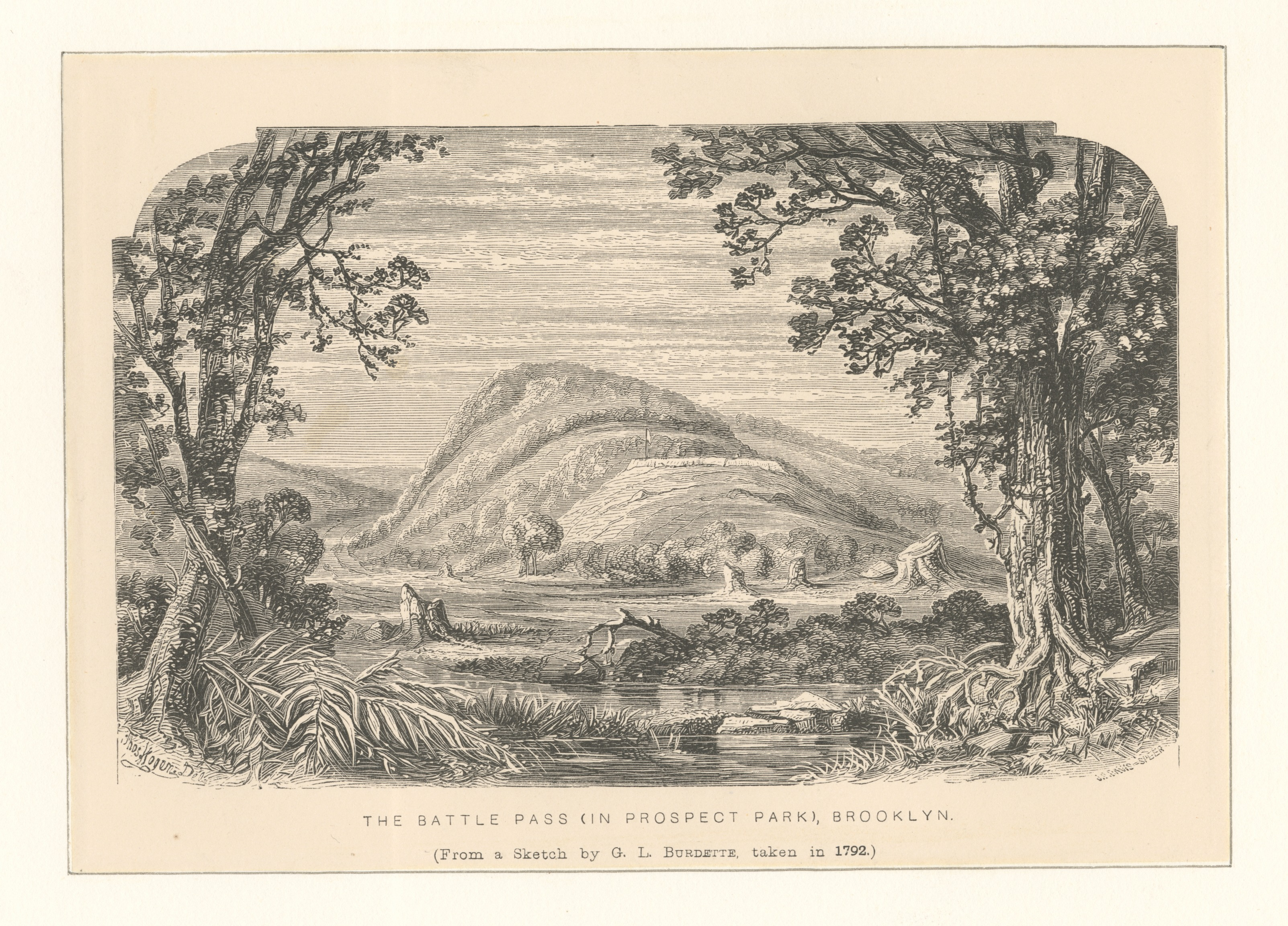
Battle Pass in 1792, with tree stumps still visible

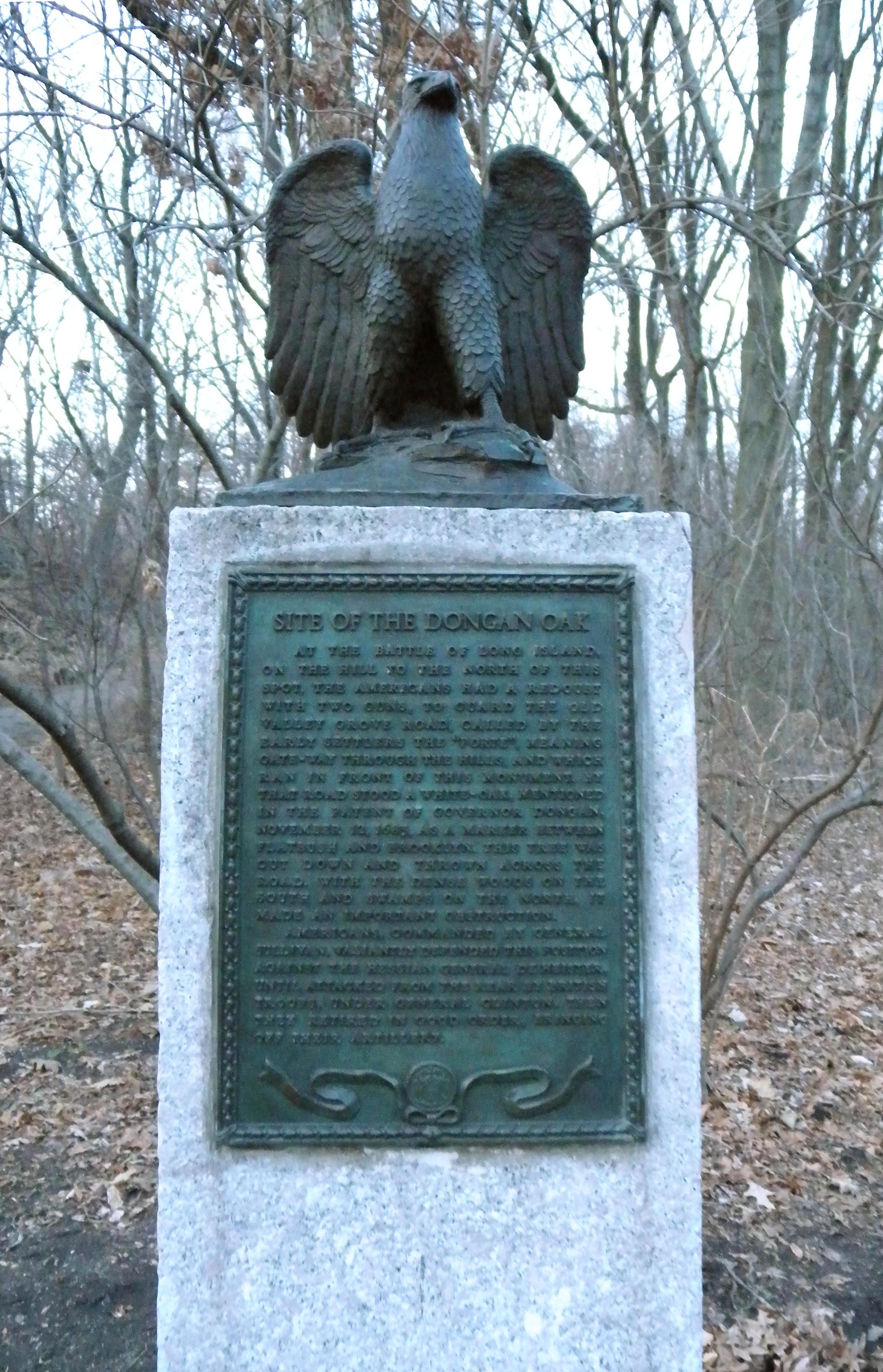
Dongan Oak Monument at Battle Pass in 2009

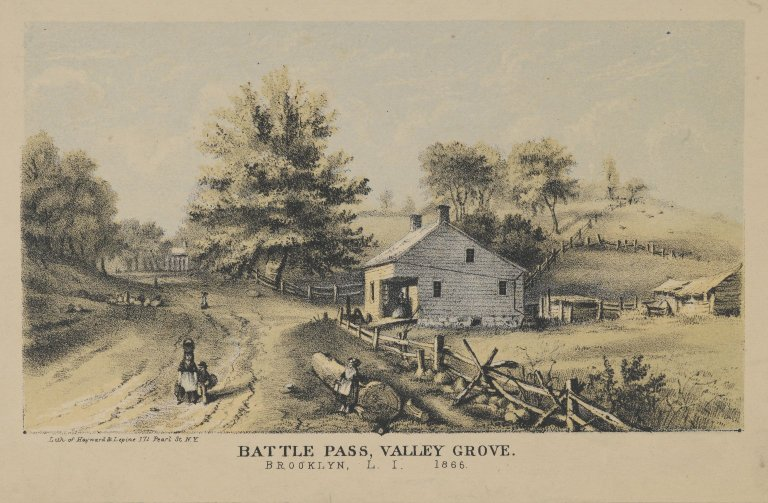
Battle Pass in 1866, shortly before the creation of Prospect Park

Battle Pass, formerly known as Flatbush Pass or Valley Grove or The Porte, is a historic hill pass that played a significant part in the 1776 Battle of Long Island, and that is currently part of Prospect Park in Brooklyn.

Flatbush Pass went through Heights of Guan along the Native American trail Mechawanienck that preceded Kings Highway (later this section became Flatbush Road), and was at the border between the Towns of Brooklyn and Flatbush in Kings County under the Dongan Charter of November 12, 1685. Earlier, Governor Lovelace mentioned the pass in documents from 1670.

== Battle of Long Island ==
Battle Pass was the site of a skirmish between Americans under John Sullivan and Hessians under Leopold Philip de Heister during the Battle of Long Island on August 27, 1776. The Hessians had 5,000 troops and the Americans had 1,300, and had two cannon on the eastern Redoubt Hill. One account says that the Dongan Oak was felled by local farmer Simon Voorhis. The skirmish was over by late morning, and Sullivan was captured. The Hessian killed a number of Americans in a devastating bayonet charge. Many of the American dead were buried at the Flatbush Reformed Dutch Church Complex, although occasionally remains were discovered in the area for years afterward. Some of the Hessians who participated in the battle appear to have etched their names at the Wyckoff-Bennett Homestead.

== Prospect Park ==
Map of notable buildings and structures at Prospect Park (note: not all entrances shown). Click on points for more details.
'"`UNIQ--templatestyles-00000017-QINU`"''"`UNIQ--templatestyles-00000018-QINU`"'

Preservation of the battlefield was one of the reasons given for the creation of Prospect Park, with the pass currently running for about 150 feet (45 m) along the car-free East Drive inside the park. It is marked by the small Dongan Oak Monument, which commemorates the boundary tree felled and used as a barricade by the American defenders against the northward invasion. The stump of the Donegan Oak was still recorded in the 1840s, and it may have actually been destroyed in the landscaping that created Prospect Park, when parts of the hills were also leveled.

Battle Pass was the site of a vineyard planted with Isabella grapes in the early 19th century.

An emphasis on naturalistic landscape architecture in the park's original design discouraged a large memorial, and the site is little-noticed today.

The United States Centennial of 1876 saw the Line of Defense monument sponsored by the Sons of the Revolution and the planting of a Centennial Oak. A symbolic new Dongan Oak was planted by John W. Hunter on Arbor Day 1890 with descendants of the Dongan family in attendance.

Raymond Ingersoll put up some temporary markers in the 1910s for Battle Pass and other Revolutionary sites in the park that have since been lost, several written by Charles M. Higgins, who also proposed a more elaborate series of Battle of Long Island monuments, including the placing of Revolutionary era cannon or captured cannon from Imperial Germany on Redoubt Hill . Cleveland Moffett also wrote a fantasy piece of invasion literature at this time set partially set in Prospect Park and recreating the battle.

The Dongan Oak Monument with its bronze eagle atop a stele was dedicated on Evacuation Day 1922, designed by Frederick Ruckstull and sponsored by the Saint Nicholas Society of the City of New York. The local "Battle Pass Chapter" of the Daughters of the American Revolution dedicated another boulder marker in 1929. The eagle of the Dongan Oak Monument was stolen in the 1970s, and again in the 1990s, and has been replaced both times by the Prospect Park Alliance. The area around the monument has been vulnerable to flooding and was repaired in the 2010s.

Two historic tablets set in boulders also mark Battle Pass.

== See also ==
- Battle Hill
- Old Stone House
