= Edward Burd =

American judge (1749–1833)

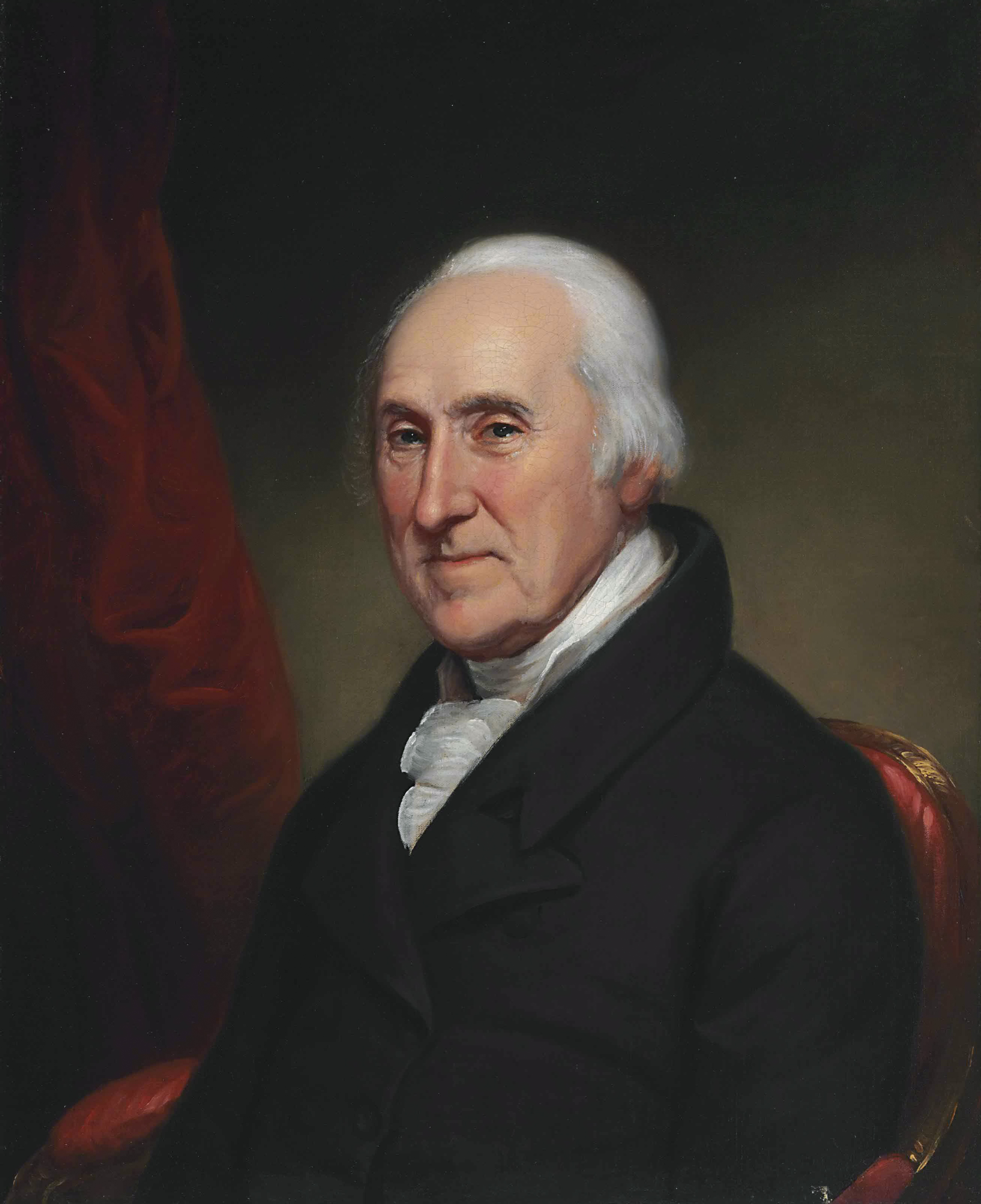
Edward Burd (Charles Willson Peale, 1820)

Edward Burd (February 5, 1749 – July 24, 1833) was a Revolutionary War officer in Pennsylvania and later a Prothonotary of the Supreme Court of Pennsylvania.

== Life ==
Burd, the son of Colonel James Burd and Sarah (Shippen) Burd, was born February 5, 1749, in Philadelphia, Pennsylvania. He studied law with his uncle, Pennsylvania Chief Justice Edward Shippen, whose daughter Elizabeth he married on December 13, 1778. He was a member of the Berks County Bar, and had a law practice in Reading, Pennsylvania.

Upon the outbreak of the Revolution, Burd volunteered and eventually rose to major in Colonel Henry Haller's Pennsylvania Battalion of the Flying Camp. During the Battle of Long Island (1776), Burd was in command of an American pickets stationed at the Red Lion Inn, in the early morning hours of August 27, 1776 after an initial exchange of gunfire with British advance troops, he was taken prisoner along with 16 other Americans under his command. After his release, ill health prevented him from reentering military service, and he returned to his legal practice in Reading. He was appointed as Prothonotary of the Pennsylvania Supreme Court on September 1, 1778, and served with great distinction until his resignation December 29, 1805.

Elected in 1785, Burd was a member of the American Philosophical Society. From 1790 to 1791, Burd served as a trustee of The Academy and College of Philadelphia, which became the University of Pennsylvania in 1791. He continued as a trustee of the University of Pennsylvania from 1791 until his death.

In 1820, Burd sat for a portrait by Charles Willson Peale. Peale gave the portrait as a wedding present to Burd's niece, Eliza Burd Patterson, who was married in March 1820 to Peale's son, Rubens Peale. It was exhibited at the Pennsylvania Academy of the Fine Arts in 1822 and hung for a time at Peale's Museum, New York City.

== Ormiston ==
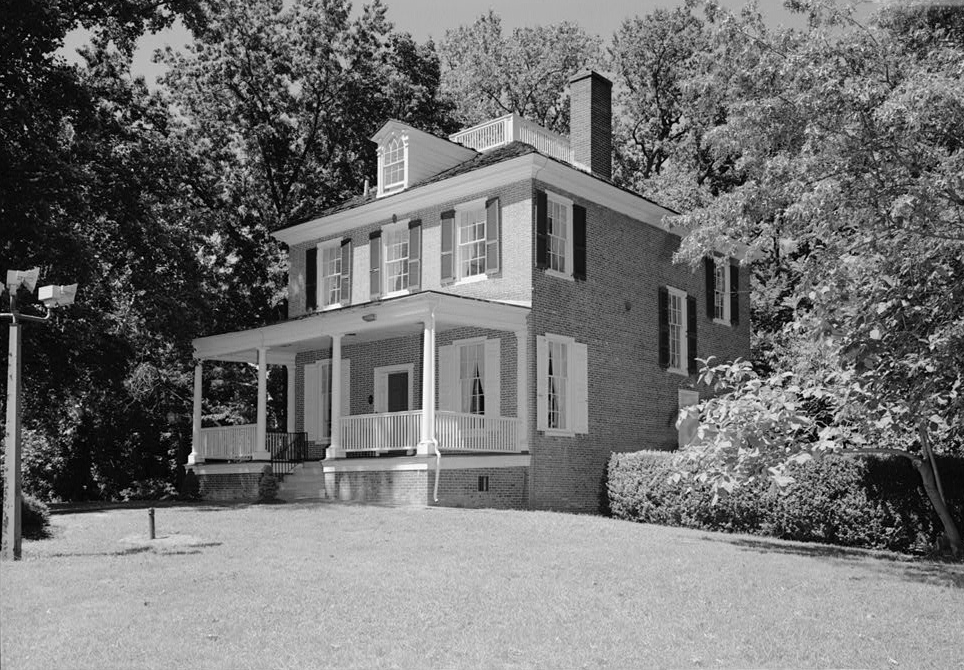
Ormiston, Fairmount Park

Burd built a house in Philadelphia on the Schuylkill River, which he named Ormiston after the birthplace of his father.

== Death ==
Edward Burd died July 24, 1833, in Philadelphia, where he was interred in Christ Church Burial Ground.
