= Heights of Guan =

Hills on Long Island, US

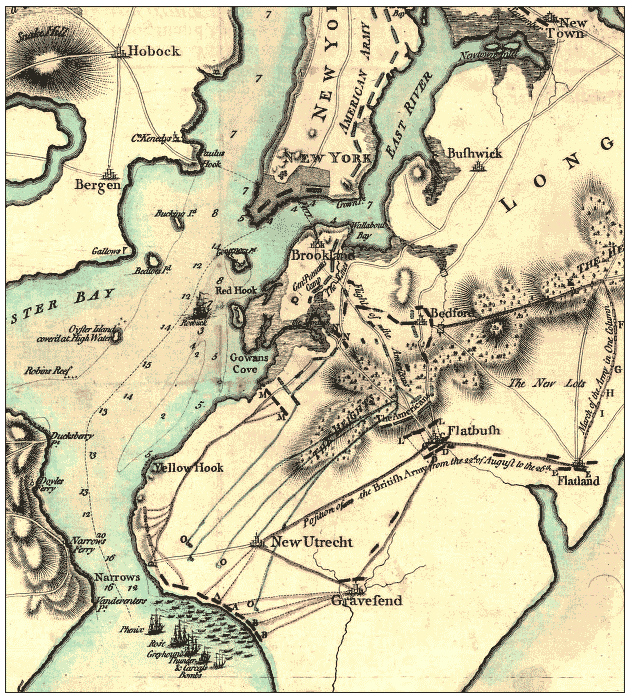
A portion of Howes Map (1776) showing "The Heights" [of Guan], north of the village of Flatbush

The Heights of Guan is a historical name given to a series of hills extending in a ridge along western Long Island in New York State. The ridge extends in an east-northeast direction across the modern-day New York City boroughs of Brooklyn and Queens, with hills varying in height from 100 to 150 feet (30 to 46 m). The southern slope of the ridge has a relatively steep drop and the northern slope is more gradual. Further to the south is an outwash plain bordered by the Atlantic Ocean. Geologically, the ridge is part of the Harbor Hill Moraine formed 13,000 to 12,000 years ago during the Wisconsin glaciation.

Guan is a variant of Gowanus.

The Heights of Guan played a strategic role during the Battle of Brooklyn, early in the American Revolutionary War. The ridge formed a natural defensive line against an attacking force from the south due to the steepness of the southern slope and the heavily wooded terrain covered in dense brush. There were four passes through the Heights of Guan:

- Gowanus Pass: Where 7,000 troops under General James Grant attacked 2,000 troops under Lord Stirling after the initial skirmish at the Red Lion Inn.
- Flatbush Pass (Battle Pass): Where the Flatbush Road cut through the pass. The Americans had chopped down a large oak tree called the Dongan Oak to block the road and the pass at a location which is in today's Prospect Park. 40.6658°N 73.9664°W
- Bedford Pass: The troops defending this pass retreated toward the Battle Pass after being outflanked.
- Jamaica Pass: The lightly guarded pass on the Jamaica road that the British used to outflank the Americans after capturing four American horsemen on guard. Howe forced William Howard, owner of Howard's Tavern located on the Jamaica Road to the south of the Heights of Guan, and his fourteen-year-old son, to show him the way to an old Rockaway Indian trail, called the Rockaway Path, which skirted the pass itself. It is in today's Evergreen Cemetery.

In the decades after the war, population growth in the Heights was not as rapid as in other nearby rural areas. Roads were improved, however, and with urban sprawl after the mid-19th century various railroads crossed the Heights including the South Brooklyn Railway. Prospect Reservoir and Ridgewood Reservoir were built on the Heights to serve the water needs of the growing City of Brooklyn, and Eastern Parkway later ran along the ridgeline between them. Park Slope and Crown Heights became prosperous suburban commuter towns.
