= Samuel John Atlee =

American politician

Samuel John Atlee (1739 – November 25, 1786) was an American soldier and statesman from Lancaster, Pennsylvania. He was a delegate to the Continental Congress for the Province of Pennsylvania from 1778 to 1782.

== Early life ==
Atlee was born in Trenton, New Jersey, but his family moved to Lancaster before he was seven. He was educated at home, and began the study of law. But his studies were interrupted by the French and Indian War.

== Military career ==
In 1756 Atlee joined the Lancaster company and was commissioned as an ensign. He served on the Forbes Expedition to Fort Duquesne in 1758, and by 1759 he was a captain.

In 1776, Pennsylvania began raising new units for the Continental Army, and on March 21, 1776, Atlee was named Colonel of a unit, the Pennsylvania Musketry Battalion. Once they were organized, he led them north to the defense of New York City. During the Battle of Long Island on August 27, 1776, he led the original defense of the Old Stone House in Brooklyn, New York. The house was situated on high ground and covered the American withdrawal. Atlee's force was driven from the house, but General William Alexander (American general) came to support him. The Americans twice recaptured the house. The defenders directly engaged three British regiments, led by General Cornwallis. They held out until noon, allowing most of the Continental forces in Brooklyn to successfully withdraw to the Brooklyn Heights. At last, surrounded and cut off by the Hessians, General Alexander surrendered in the early afternoon. While watching this action from fortifications to the north on Brooklyn Heights, General Washington remarked, "Good God, what brave men must I lose this day!" Soldiers including Captain Joseph Howell Jr. were taken prisoner, while Atlee remained a prisoner of war until he was exchanged in October 1778.

== Political career ==
When Atlee returned home, the Pennsylvania General Assembly named him as a delegate to the Continental Congress. He served there until 1782. In 1782, Lancaster County sent Atlee to the Pennsylvania Assembly. In 1783, he became a charter member in the Pennsylvania branch of the Society of the Cincinnati, and was named the County executive for Lancaster County. In 1784, he served on the commission negotiating treaties with Native Americans that acquired most of the remaining Native American lands in Pennsylvania.

Atlee was returned to the state assembly in 1785 and 1786. He died on November 25, 1786, while attending a meeting of the legislature in Philadelphia, and is buried in the Christ Church Burial Ground there.

| Preceded by James Cunningham | Member, Supreme Executive Council of Pennsylvania, representing Lancaster County; 21 October 1783 – 22 December 1784 | Succeeded by John Whitehill |
