= Leopold Philip de Heister =

Hessian general who fought for the British (1716-1777)

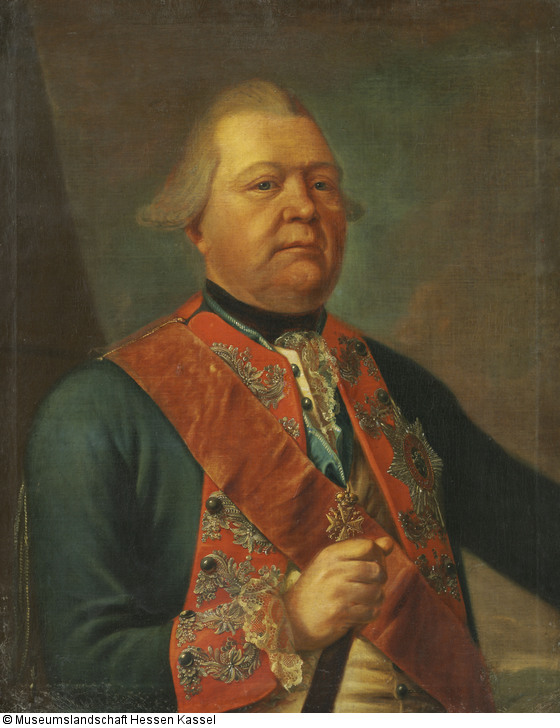
- Leopold Philip de Heister
- Born: 4 April 1716; Homberg, Landgraviate of Hesse-Kassel
- Died: 19 November 1777 (aged 61); Kassel, Hesse-Kassel
- Military career
- Allegiance: France; Hesse-Kassel
- Rank: Generalleutnant
- Commands: Hessian Corps
- Conflicts: War of the Austrian Succession; Seven Years' War; American Revolutionary War

Leopold Philip de Heister (4 April 1716 — 19 November 1777) was a Hessian general who notably fought for the British during the American Revolutionary War.

== Biography ==
Heister originally chose his native Hessian service before joining the French for the War of the Austrian Succession, being wounded and captured at Braunau. Back in Hessian service he fought in the Seven Years' War, leading the Guard Cavalry Regiment, and being wounded in the battles of Hastenbeck, Krefeld and Bergen. When the war ended he was promoted to Major General.

In 1776, when Landgrave Frederick II of Hesse-Kassel decided to rent out troops to the British government for service against the American colonies in what would become the American Revolutionary War, Heister was chosen to command the corps. He landed on Long Island near New Utrecht with two full Hessian brigades on 25 August 1776, three days after the arrival of Gen. William Howe with the British troops.

Soon after debarking, the invading army prepared for marching, the Hessians under De Heister forming the centre, or main body. They cannonaded the works at Flatbush Pass (today Battle Pass), and De Heister ordered Carl von Donop to storm the redoubt, while he pressed forward with his troops. Heister also commanded the Hessians at White Plains on 28 October 1776. He was removed from command in 1777, after the Battle of Trenton and continued disagreements with General Howe. He was replaced by his second-in-command Wilhelm von Knyphausen.

== See also ==
- Germans in the American Revolution
