= Battle of Long Island =

1776 battle of the American Revolutionary War

- Part of the American Revolutionary War
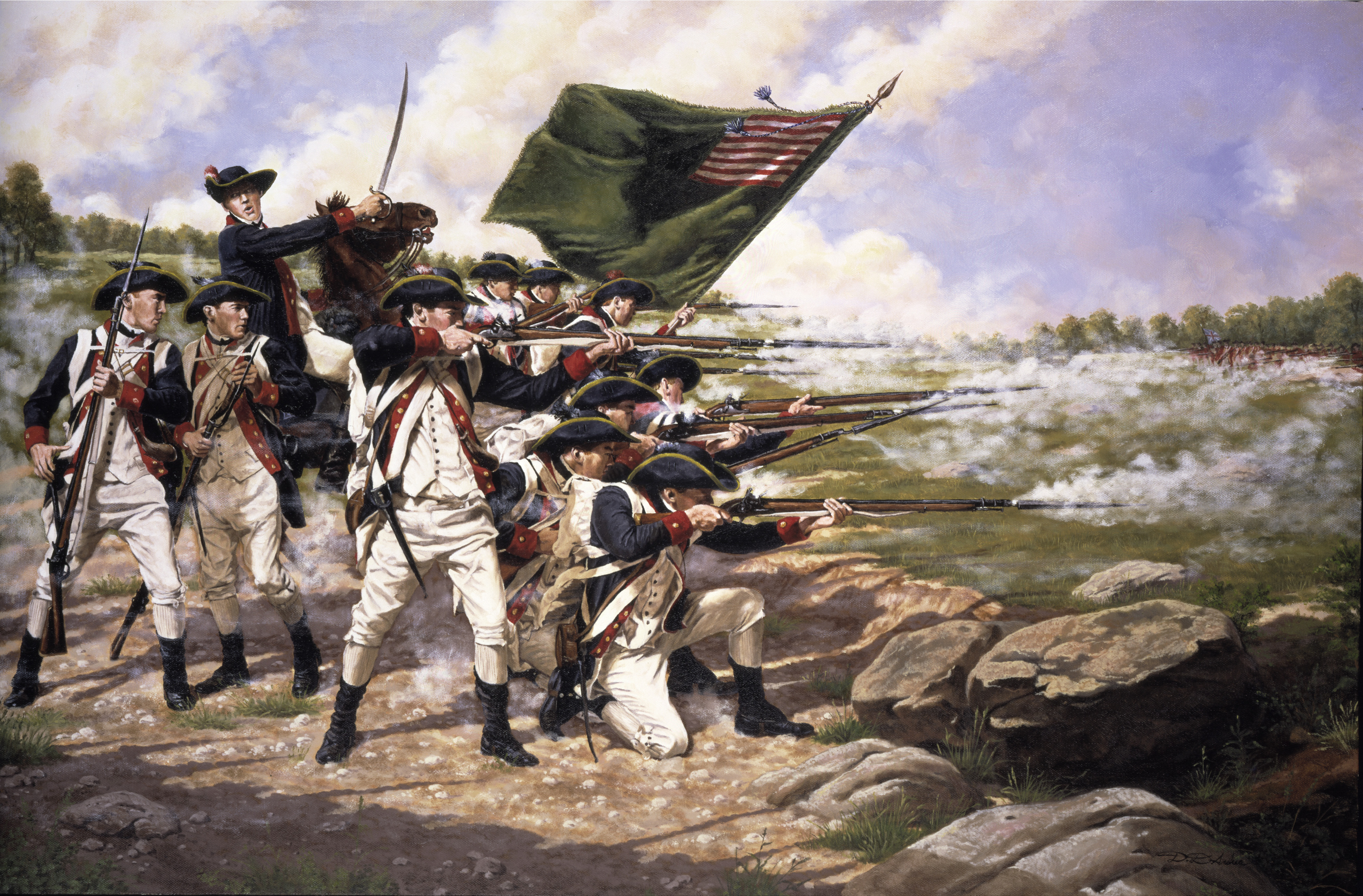
- 2004 painting of the battle
Date	August 27, 1776
Location	Brooklyn, New York, United States 40°39′58″N 73°57′58″W
Result	British victory
Territorial changes	The British capture New York City and Long Island from the Continental Army, and would remain under British occupation until the final evacuation in 1783

Belligerents
Great Britain; Hesse-Kassel	United States

Commanders and leaders
William Howe; Charles Cornwallis; Henry Clinton; William Erskine; James Grant; Charles Mawhood; Francis Smith	George Washington; Israel Putnam; William Alexander (surrendered); Thomas Mifflin; Henry Knox; John Sullivan (surrendered)

Strength
20,000	10,000

Casualties and losses
64 killed; 293 wounded; 31 missing	300 killed 800 wounded 1,079 captured or missing
- Location within New York City Battle of Long Island (New York)

The Battle of Long Island, also known as the Battle of Brooklyn and the Battle of Brooklyn Heights, was an action of the American Revolutionary War fought on August 27, 1776, at and near the western edge of Long Island in present-day Brooklyn. The British defeated the Continental Army and gained access to the strategically important Port of New York, which they held for the rest of the war. It was the first major battle to take place after the United States declared its independence on July 4, 1776, in Philadelphia. It was the largest battle of the Revolutionary War in terms of both troop deployment and combat.

After defeating the British in the siege of Boston on March 17, Continental Army commander-in-chief George Washington relocated his army to defend the port city of New York, located at the southern end of Manhattan Island. Washington understood the city's harbor would provide an excellent base for the Royal Navy, so he established defenses there and waited for the British to attack. In July, the British, under the command of General William Howe, landed a few miles across the harbor on the sparsely populated Staten Island, where they were reinforced by a fleet of ships in Lower New York Bay over the next month and a half, bringing their total force to 32,000 troops. Washington knew the difficulty in holding the city with the British fleet in control of the entrance to the harbor at the Narrows, and moved the bulk of his forces to Manhattan, believing it would be the first target.

On August 22, the British landed on the shores of Gravesend Bay in southwest Kings County, across the Narrows from Staten Island and more than a dozen miles south of the established East River crossings to Manhattan. After five days of waiting, the British attacked the American defenses on Guan Heights. Unbeknownst to the Americans, Howe had brought his main army around their rear and attacked their flank soon after. The Americans panicked, resulting in twenty percent losses through casualties and capture, although a stand by 400 Maryland and Delaware troops prevented greater losses.

The remainder of the army retreated to the main defenses on Brooklyn Heights. The British dug in for a siege, but on the night of August 29–30, Washington evacuated the entire army to Manhattan without the loss of supplies or a single life. The Continental Army was driven out of Manhattan entirely after several more defeats and was forced to retreat through New Jersey to Pennsylvania.

== Prelude ==
In the first stage of the war, the British Army was trapped in the peninsular city of Boston and was forced to abandon it on March 17, sailing to Halifax, Nova Scotia, to await reinforcements. Washington then began to transfer regiments to New York City, which he believed the British would attack next because of the port's strategic importance. He had sent his second-in-command Charles Lee to New York the previous February to establish the city's defenses. Lee remained in New York City until March 7 when the Continental Congress sent him to the Carolinas. Before he departed for the South, Lee had also seen to it that the immediate area was cleared of Loyalists. After Lee's departure, construction of the city's defenses was left to American General William Alexander, Lord Stirling.

Washington left Boston on April 4, arrived in New York on April 13, and established headquarters at the former home of Archibald Kennedy on Broadway facing Bowling Green. Troops were in limited supply, so Washington found the defenses incomplete, but Lee had concluded in any case it would be impossible to hold the city with the British commanding the sea. He reasoned the defenses should be located with the ability to inflict heavy casualties upon the British if any move was made to take and hold ground. Barricades and redoubts were established in and around the city, and the bastion of Fort Stirling was built across the East River in Brooklyn Heights, facing the city.

=== Strategy ===
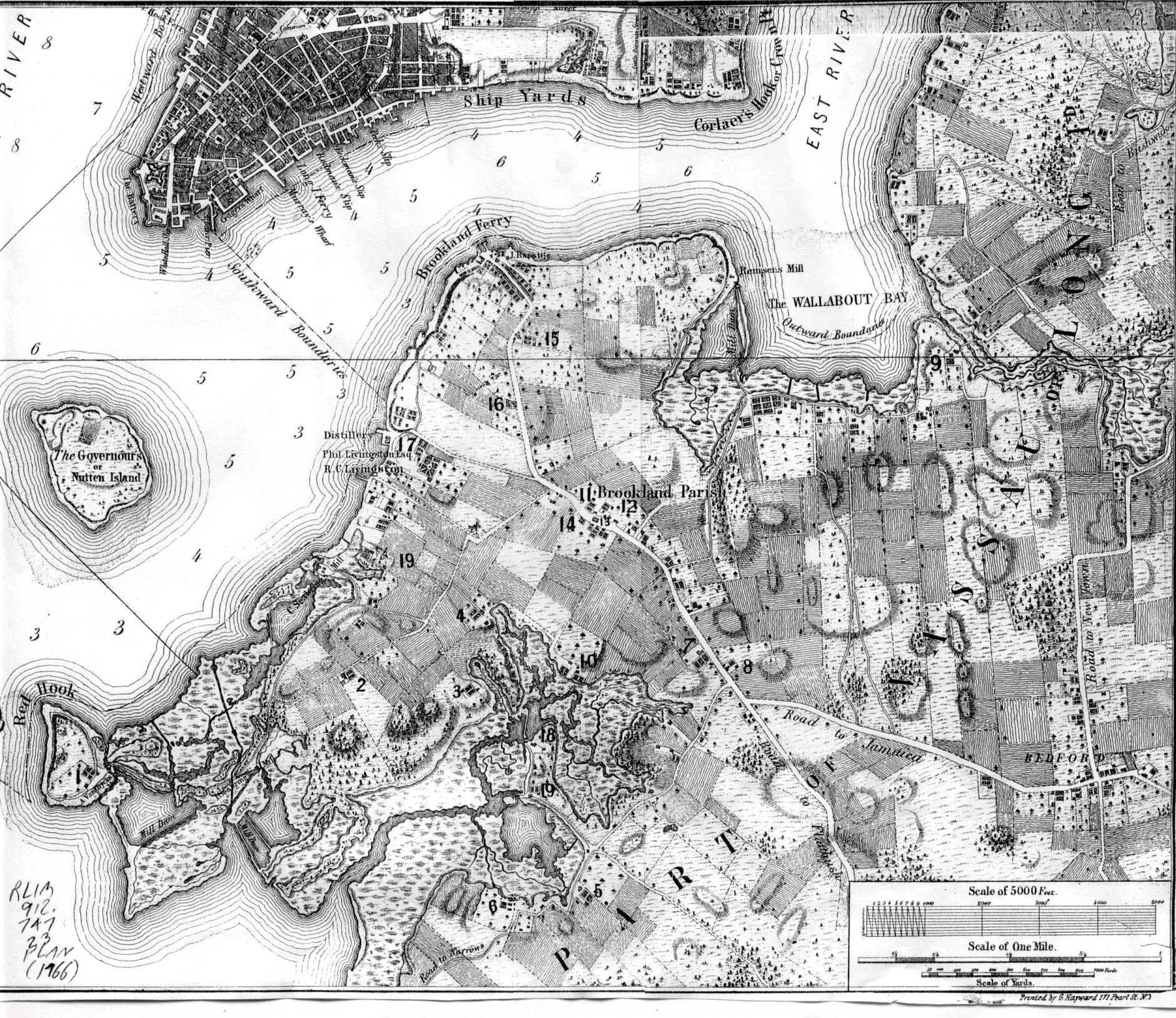
American strategy called for the first line of defense to be based on the Heights of Guan, a collection of hills stretching northeast across King's County. The main defensive works were a series of forts and entrenchments located in the northwest of King's County, in and around Brooklyn. The "Road to Narrows" is Gowanus Road. No. 5, the Old Stone House, depicted in this map by Bernard Ratzer based on his 1766–1767 survey.

Washington began moving troops to Brooklyn in early May, and there were several thousand of them there in a short time. Three more forts were under construction on the eastern side of the East River to support Fort Stirling, which stood to the west of the hamlet of Brooklyn Heights. These new fortifications were Fort Putnam, Fort Greene, and Fort Box (named for Major Daniel Box). They lay from north to south, with Fort Putnam farthest to the north, Greene slightly to the southwest, and Box slightly farther southwest. Each of these defensive structures was surrounded by a large ditch, all connected by a line of entrenchments and a total of 36 cannons.

Fort Defiance was also being constructed at this time, located farther southwest past Fort Box, near present-day Red Hook. In addition to these new forts, a mounted battery was established on Governors Island, cannons were placed at Fort George facing Bowling Green on Manhattan, and more cannons were placed at the Whitehall Dock, which sat on the East River. Hulks were sunk at strategic locations to deter the British from entering the East River and other waterways.

Washington had been authorized by Congress to recruit an army of up to 28,501 troops, but he had only 19,000 when he reached New York. Military discipline was inadequate; routine orders were not carried out, muskets were fired in camp, flints were ruined, bayonets were used as knives to cut food, and firearm readiness was lax. Petty internal conflict was common under the strain of a large number of people from different regional cultures and temperaments living in relatively close proximity.

Commander of the artillery Henry Knox persuaded Washington to transfer 400 to 500 soldiers, who lacked muskets or guns, to crew the artillery. In early June, Knox and General Nathanael Greene inspected the land at the north end of Manhattan and decided to establish Fort Washington. Fort Constitution, later renamed Fort Lee, was planned opposite Fort Washington on the Hudson River. The forts were intended to discourage the British ships from sailing up the Hudson River.

=== British arrival ===
Opposing commanders

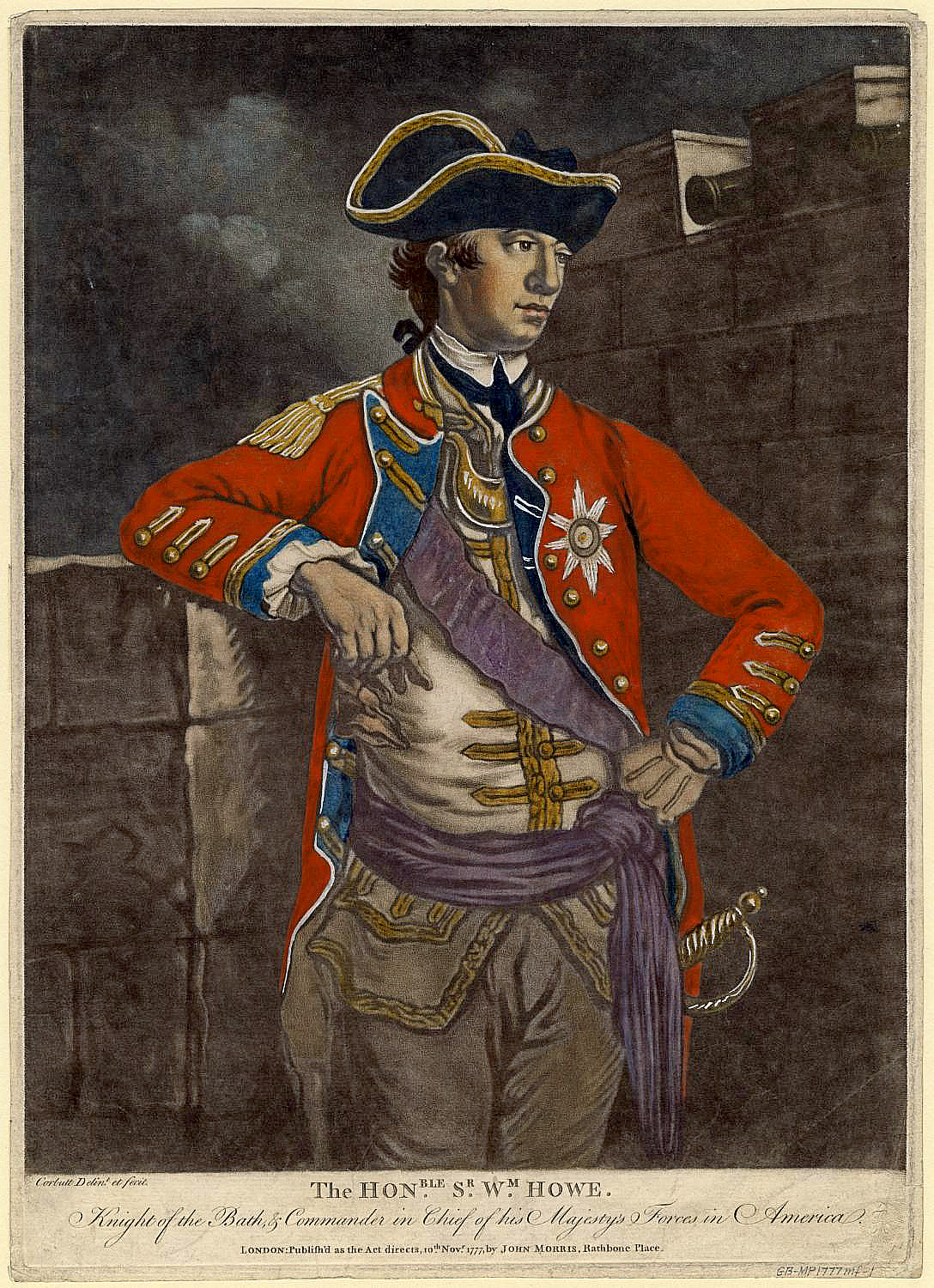
General
William Howe

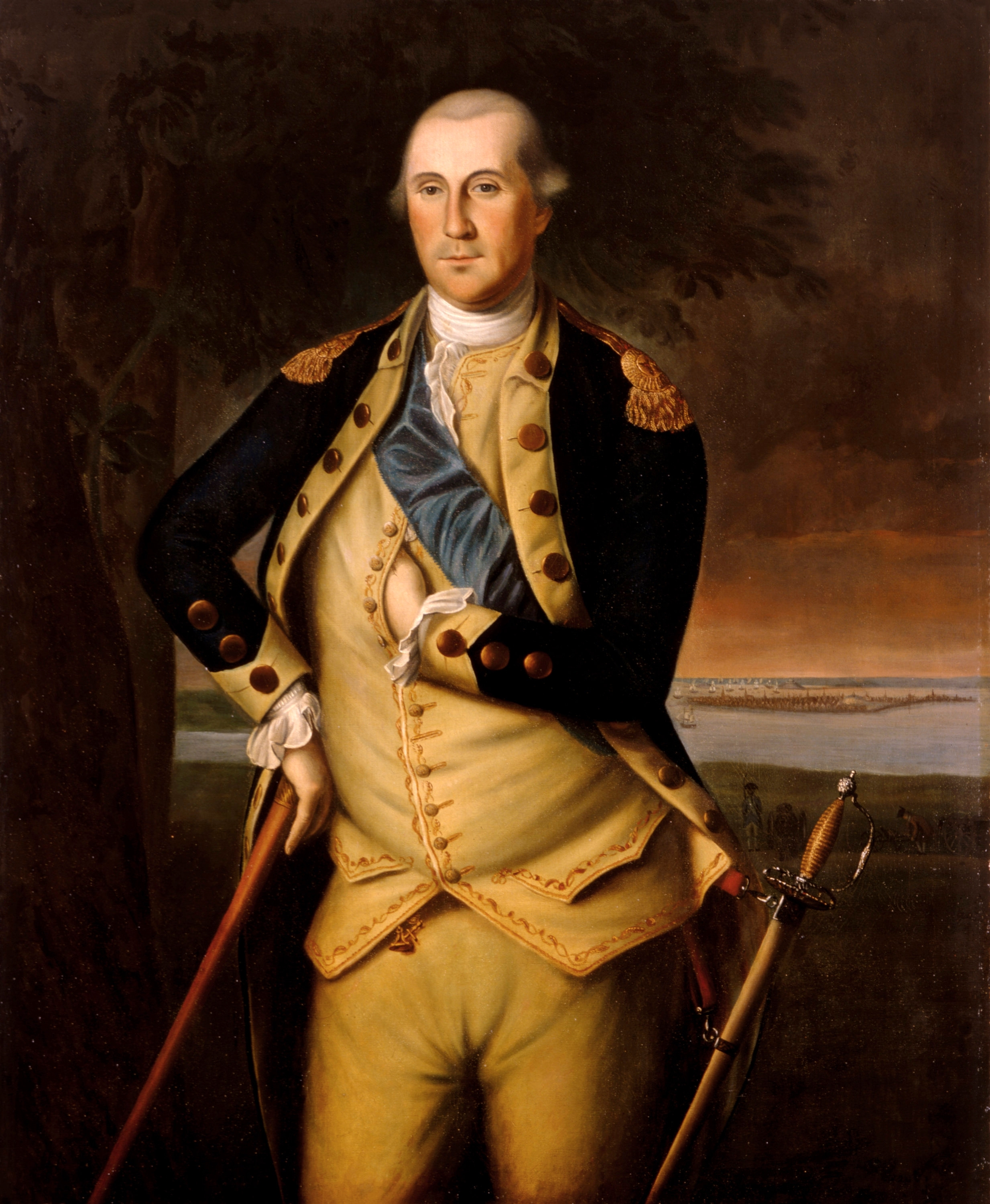
General
George Washington

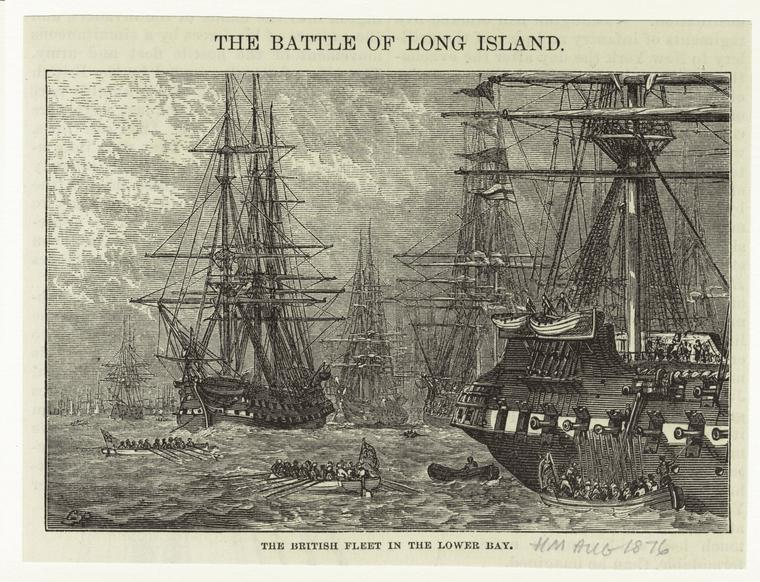
The British fleet in the lower bay, published in Harper's Magazine in 1876, depicts a Royal Navy fleet amassing off Staten Island in the summer of 1776

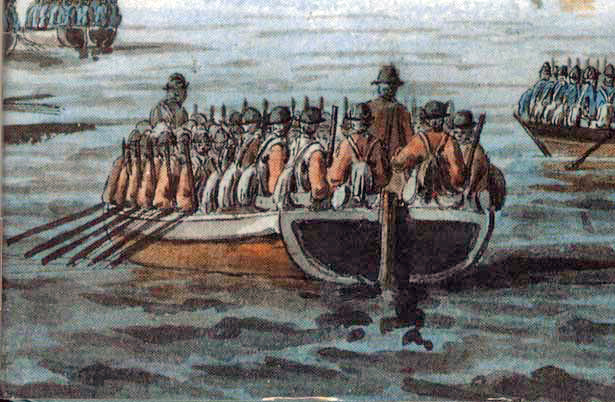
British troops in the type of flat-bottomed boat used for the invasion of Long Island. Hessians, loyal to the British, are in the two boats, in blue uniforms and partly visible.

On June 28, General Washington learned the British fleet had set sail from Halifax on June 9 and was heading toward New York. On June 29, signals were sent from soldiers stationed on Staten Island indicating the British fleet had appeared. Within a few hours, 45 British ships dropped anchor in Lower New York Bay. The population of New York went into a panic at the sight of the British ships; alarms went off and troops immediately rushed to their posts. On July 2, British troops began to land on Staten Island. The Continental regulars on the island took a few shots at them before fleeing, and the citizens' militia switched over to the British side. Less than a week later, there were 130 ships off Staten Island under the command of Richard Howe, the brother of General Howe.

On July 6, news reached New York that Congress had voted for independence four days earlier. On Tuesday, July 9, at 18:00, Washington had several brigades march onto the commons of the city to hear the Declaration of Independence read. After the end of the reading, a mob ran down to Bowling Green with ropes and bars, where they tore down the gilded lead equestrian statue of George III of Great Britain. In their fury, the crowd cut off the statue's head, severed the nose, mounted what remained of the head on a spike outside a tavern, and the rest of the statue was dragged to Connecticut and melted down into musket balls.

On July 12, the British ships Phoenix and Rose sailed up the harbor toward the mouth of the Hudson. The American batteries opened fire from the harbor defenses of Fort George, Fort Defiance, and Governors Island, but the British returned fire into the city. The ships sailed along the New Jersey shore and continued up the Hudson, sailing past Fort Washington and arriving by nightfall at Tarrytown, the widest part of the Hudson. The goals of the British ships were to cut off American supplies from New England and the north and to encourage Loyalist support. The only casualties of the day were six Americans who were killed when their own cannon blew up.

The next day, July 13, Howe attempted to open negotiations with the Americans. He sent a letter to Washington delivered by Lieutenant Philip Brown, who arrived under a flag of truce. The letter was addressed to "George Washington, Esq." Brown was met by Joseph Reed, who had hurried to the waterfront on Washington's orders, accompanied by Henry Knox and Samuel Webb. Washington asked his officers whether it should be received or not, as it did not recognize his rank as general, and they unanimously said no. Reed told Brown there was no one in the army with that address. On July 16, Howe tried again, this time with the address "George Washington, Esq., etc., etc.", but it was again declined.

The next day, Howe sent Captain Nisbet Balfour to ask if Washington would meet with Howe's adjutant face to face, and a meeting was scheduled for July 20. Howe's adjutant was Colonel James Patterson. Patterson told Washington Howe had come with powers to grant pardons, but Washington said, "Those who have committed no fault want no pardon." Patterson departed soon after. Washington's performance during the meeting was praised in many parts of the country.

Meanwhile, British ships continued to arrive. On August 1, 45 ships arrived with generals Henry Clinton and Charles Cornwallis, along with 3,000 troops. By August 12, 3,000 British troops and another 8,000 Hessians had arrived. At this point, the British fleet numbered over 400 ships, including 73 warships, and 32,000 troops were camped on Staten Island. Faced with this large force, Washington was unsure as to where the British would attack. Both Greene and Reed thought the British would attack Long Island, but Washington felt a British attack on Long Island might be a diversion for the main attack on Manhattan. He broke his army in half, stationing half of it on Manhattan and the other half on Long Island; the army on Long Island was commanded by Greene. On August 20, Greene became ill and was forced to move to a house in Manhattan, where he rested to recover. John Sullivan was placed in command until Greene was well enough to resume command.

=== Invasion of Long Island ===
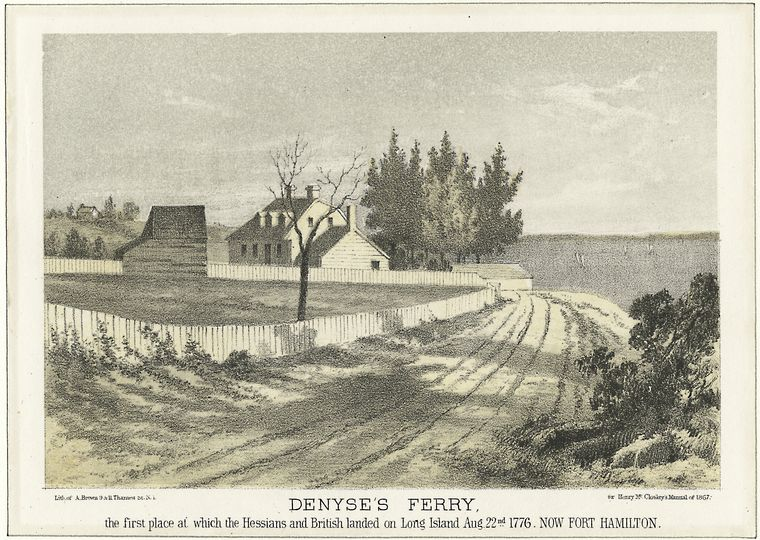
Denyse's Ferry, the first place at which the Hessians and British landed on Long Island August 22, 1776 a portrait by A. Brown depicting the American artillery position at the high point overlooking the Narrows, which was bombarded by the British before the invasion. The Royal Navy landed farther east at Gravesend Bay, where the conditions were more favorable for small British boats carrying the troops.

At 05:10 on August 22, an advance guard of 4,000 British troops left Staten Island under the command of Clinton and Cornwallis to land on Long Island. At 08:00, all 4,000 troops landed unopposed on the shore of Gravesend Bay. Colonel Edward Hand's Pennsylvanian riflemen had been stationed on the shore, but they did not oppose the landings and fell back, killing cattle and burning farmhouses on the way. By noon, 15,000 troops had landed on shore along with 40 pieces of artillery, as hundreds of Loyalists came to greet the British troops. Cornwallis pushed on with the advance guard, advancing 6 miles (9.7 km) onto the island and establishing a camp at the village of Flatbush. He was given orders to advance no further.

Washington received word of the landings the same day but was informed the number was 8,000 to 9,000 troops. This convinced him it was the feint he had predicted, and therefore he only sent 1,500 more troops to Brooklyn, bringing the total number of troops on Long Island to 6,000. On August 24, Washington replaced Sullivan with Israel Putnam who commanded the troops on Long Island. Putnam arrived on Long Island the next day along with six battalions. Also that day, the British troops on Long Island received 5,000 Hessian reinforcements, bringing their total to 20,000. There was little fighting on the days immediately after the landing, although some small skirmishes did take place with American marksmen armed with rifles picking off British troops from time to time.

The American plan was for Putnam to direct the defenses from Brooklyn Heights, while Sullivan and Stirling and their troops would be stationed forward on the Guan Heights. The Guan (hills) were up to 150 feet high and blocked the most direct route to Brooklyn Heights. Washington believed heavy casualties could be inflicted on the British by stationing men on the heights before the troops fell back to the main defenses at Brooklyn Heights.

There were three main passes through the heights; the Gowanus Road, farthest to the west; the Flatbush Road, slightly farther to the east, in the center of the American line, where it was expected the British would attack, and the Bedford Pass even further to the east. Stirling was responsible for defending the Gowanus Road with 500 men. Sullivan was to defend the Flatbush and Bedford roads, where there were 1,000 and 800 soldiers respectively. 6,000 troops were to remain behind at Brooklyn Heights. There was one lesser-known path through the heights called the Jamaica Pass, farthest to the east, which was patrolled by just five militia officers on horseback.

On the British side, General Clinton learned of the almost undefended Jamaica Pass from local Loyalists. He drew up a plan and gave it to William Erskine to propose to Howe. Clinton's plan had the main army making a night march and going through the Jamaica Pass to turn the American flank, while other troops would keep the Americans busy in front. On August 26, Clinton received word from Howe the plan would be used and Clinton was to command the advance guard of the main army of 10,000 soldiers on the march through the Jamaica Pass. While they made the night march, General James Grant's British troops, along with some Hessians, a total of 4,000 men, were to attack the Americans in front to distract them from the main army coming on their flank. Howe told Clinton to be ready to move out that night, August 26.

== Battle ==
=== Night march ===
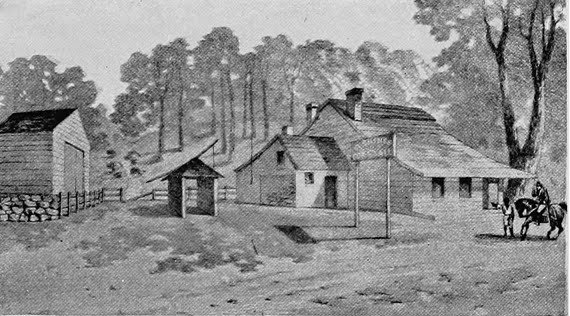
Howard's Tavern, depicted in 1776 and demolished sometime after 1900, was located near the present-day intersection of Fulton Street and Jamaica Avenue.

At 21:00, the British moved out. No one except the commanders knew of the plan. Clinton led a crack brigade of light infantry with fixed bayonets in front, followed by Cornwallis, who had eight battalions and 14 artillery pieces. Cornwallis was followed by Howe and Hugh Percy with six battalions, more artillery, and baggage. The column consisted of 10,000 men who stretched out over two miles. Three Loyalist farmers led the column toward the Jamaica Pass. The British had left their campfires burning to deceive the Americans into thinking nothing was happening. The column headed northeast until it reached what later became the village of New Lots, when it headed directly north toward the heights.

The column had yet to run into any American troops when they reached Howard's Tavern (also known as "Howard's Half-Way House"), just a few hundred yards from the Jamaica Pass. Tavern keeper William Howard and his son William Jr. were forced to act as guides to show the British the way to the Rockaway Foot Path, an old Lenape trail skirting the Jamaica Pass to the west, located today in the Cemetery of the Evergreens.

Five minutes after leaving the tavern, the five American militia officers stationed at the pass were captured without a shot being fired, as they thought the British were Americans. Clinton interrogated the men, and they informed him they were the only troops guarding the pass. By dawn, the British were through the pass and stopped so the troops could rest. At 09:00, they fired two heavy cannons to signal the Hessian troops below Battle Pass to begin their frontal assault against Sullivan's men deployed on the two hills flanking the pass, while Clinton's troops simultaneously flanked the American positions from the east.

=== Grant's diversionary attack; Battle Hill where British suffer their highest casualties ===
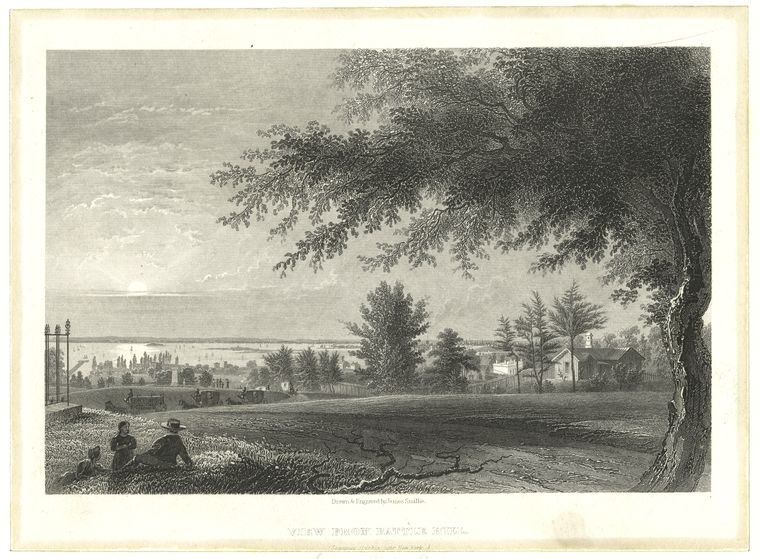
A view from Battle Hill, the highest point in King's County, looking west toward Upper New York Harbor and New Jersey, where Lord Stirling confronted about 300 Continental Army troops under Colonel Atlee and General Parsons, who attacked the British successively, ultimately took Battle Hill, and inflicted the highest casualties against the British during the Battle of Long Island.

At about 23:00 on August 26, the first shots were fired in the Battle of Long Island, near the Red Lion Inn (near present-day 39th Street and 4th Avenue). American pickets from Samuel John Atlee's Pennsylvania regiment fired upon two British soldiers who were foraging in a watermelon patch near the inn. Around 01:00 on August 27, the British approached the vicinity of the Red Lion with 200–300 troops. The American troops fired upon the British; after approximately two fusillades, they fled up the Gowanus Road toward the Vechte–Cortelyou House. Major Edward Burd was in command, but he was captured along with a lieutenant and 15 privates. This first engagement was fought in the vicinity of 38th and 39th Streets between 2nd and 3rd Avenues near a swamp located adjacent to Gowanus Road.

Brigadier General Samuel Holden Parsons and Colonel Atlee were stationed farther north on Gowanus Road. Parsons was a lawyer from Connecticut who had recently secured a commission in the Continental Army; Atlee was a veteran of the French and Indian War in command of the First Regiment of Pennsylvania Musketry. Putnam had been awakened by a guard at 03:00 and told the British were attacking through Gowanus Pass. He lit signals to Washington, who was on Manhattan, and then rode south to warn Stirling of the attack.

As Field Officer of the Day, Gen. Parsons had spent the night at the Simon Bergen House on the Gowanus Road and thus was present and on duty on that road since shortly after sunrise. Having been roused as early as 3:00 AM by the alert of British troops advancing along the Gowanus Road, the 17th Connecticut Continental Regiment had marched from the Brooklyn fortifications in downtown Brooklyn and arrived on the Gowanus Road by around 7:00 AM to support Parsons. Not long thereafter, Stirling arrived there with parts of Colonel John Haslet's 1st Delaware Regiment under the immediate command of Major Thomas Macdonough, and Colonel William Smallwood's 1st Maryland Infantry under the immediate command of Major Mordecai Gist. Both Haslet and Smallwood had been on duty in Manhattan at the Zedwitz court martial and arrived too late on the morning of the battle to lead their respective regiments. Stirling led this combined force of about 1,600 to stop the advance along the Gowanus Road by the two British brigades under Gen. James Grant.

Stirling placed Atlee's men in an apple orchard owned by Wynant Bennett on the south side of Gowanus Road near present-day 3rd Avenue and 18th Street. Upon the approach of the British, the Americans "took possession of a hill about two miles from camp, and detached Colonel Atlee to meet them further on the road; in about sixty rods he drew up and received the enemy's fire and gave them a well-directed fire from his regiment, which did great execution, and then retreated to the hill". That hill was not the same one as Battle Hill, discussed below.

Stirling took up positions with the Delaware and Maryland regiments just to the north of Atlee's men on the slopes of a rise of land between 18th and 20th Streets. Some of the Maryland troops were positioned on a small hill near today's 23rd Street, which the local Dutch called "Blokje Berg" (Dutch for cube or block hill). At the base of this hill, Gowanus Road crossed a small bridge over a ditch that drained a marshy area. When the British advanced up Gowanus Road, the American troops fired upon them from positions on the north side of the ditch. To their left was Colonel Peter Kachline's Pennsylvania regiment.

For nearly 250 years most of the attention of historians and authors has been focused on the stand by Lord Stirling and the so-called "Maryland 400" at the Vechte-Cortelyou House, starting around noon on the day of the battle. However, the fighting there constituted only half of the story of the Battle of Brooklyn. The other half of the battle, which has received far less attention, consisted of the series of ferocious firefights which started earlier that day about 8:30 AM, and lasted until after noon, on the "hill of clear ground", as Col. Samuel J. Atlee referred to it in his Journal of the battle. That hill is the highest point in King's County at 220 feet (67 m). That summit later came to be known as Battle Hill "Battle Hill," because that was the location of the bloodiest, most brutal fighting of the entire day. It is located in what is today Greenwood Cemetery by the cemetery's boundary of 23rd Street and 7th Avenue.

The British attempted to outflank the American positions by taking this hill. The British reached the summit first. The American force assigned to capture Battle Hill was led by Brig. Gen. Samuel Holden Parsons and consisted of troops from the 17th Connecticut Continental Regiment, the Delaware Regiment, and part of the Pennsylvania Musketry Battalion of Col. Samuel J. Atlee. The Patriots' initial assault on the summit was driven back by heavy British fire. Since this was the first actual combat by most of these American troops, some of them panicked. All but 18 of the Delaware Regiment fled the summit, drawing with them more than half of Atlee's men. Parsons steadied his remaining troops, now about 250 officers and men from the 17th Connecticut Regiment, 18 officers and men from Delaware, and no more than 50 officers and men from Atlee's Battalion.

On their second attempt, Parsons's force, consisting of no more than about 300 at this point, succeeded in capturing the summit. Then over a period of about three hours, they drove back three vigorous British counterattacks. In the brutal fighting on Battle Hill, the Americans inflicted the highest number of casualties against the British troops during the entire Battle of Long Island. More than 40% of the British deaths over the entire battlefield took place on Battle Hill. Among those killed by Parsons's troops on Battle Hill was British Colonel James Grant, who led the Americans mistakenly to believe they had killed General James Grant. Among the American dead was Colonel Caleb Parry (from Atlee's Battalion), who was killed while rallying the American troops in the capture of the Battle Hill summit.

Unbeknownst to Parsons and his men, starting around 9:00 PM the previous night, the British had silently marched about 10,000 seasoned troops around the distant (and essentially unguarded) Jamaica Pass. By 9:00 AM, those British troops had proceeded down the road leading from Jamaica and reached the town of Bedford. Around the same time, the Hessian troops under Gen. Leopold Philip De Heister were starting to attack through the Bedford Pass and the Flatbush Pass, and the two British battalions under Gen. James Grant started pushing forward along the Gowanus Road. By midday, the British troops that had marched round the Jamaica Pass started to march south along the Gowanus Road, then started heading up into the hills.

Around noon, Parsons's men became aware that they were becoming surrounded. They tried to fight their way through, but no matter which direction they turned, they encountered enemy forces blocking their path. Eventually, they split up into smaller groups desperately seeking to escape. They were so heavily outnumbered (likely by at least ten to one at this point), escape was impossible for most of them. More than 80% of Parsons's men were captured, the highest rate of any Patriot regiment.

=== Battle Pass ===
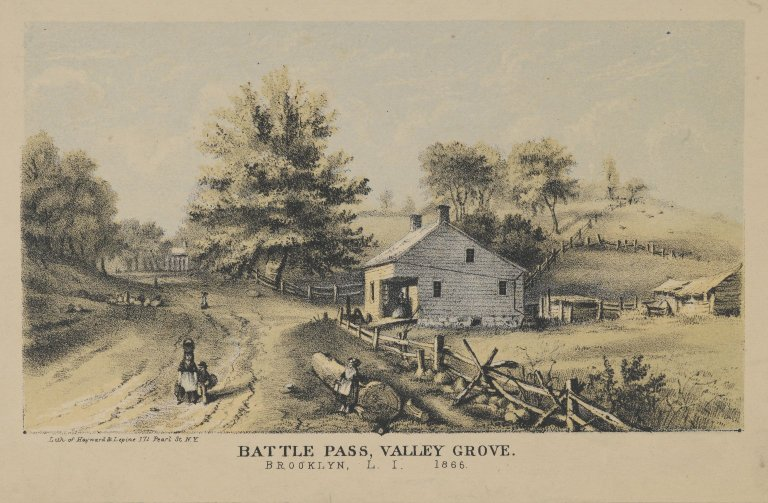
A circa 1866 lithograph of Battle Pass, also known as "Flatbush Pass" in present-day Prospect Park in Brooklyn, General Sullivan and his troops were outflanked by the British, who attacked from the rear while the Hessians attacked up Battle Pass.

The Hessians in the center under the command of General von Heister began to bombard the American lines stationed at Battle Pass under the command of General John Sullivan. The Hessian brigades did not attack, as they were waiting for the pre-arranged signal from the British, who were in the process of outflanking the American lines at that time. The Americans were still under the assumption Grant's attack up Gowanus Road was the main thrust, and thus Sullivan sent 400 soldiers to reinforce Stirling.

Howe fired his signal guns at 09:00, and the Hessians began to attack up Battle Pass, while the main army came at Sullivan from the rear. Sullivan left his advance guard to hold off the Hessians while he turned the rest of his force around to fight the British. Heavy casualties mounted between the Americans and the British, and men on both sides fled out of fear. Sullivan attempted to calm his men and tried to lead a retreat. By this point, the Hessians had overrun the advance guard on the heights, and the American left had completely collapsed. Hand-to-hand fighting followed, with the Americans swinging their muskets and rifles like clubs to save their own lives. It was later claimed Americans who surrendered were bayoneted by the Hessians. Sullivan, despite the chaos, managed to evacuate most of his men to Brooklyn Heights, though he himself was captured.

=== Vechte–Cortelyou House ===
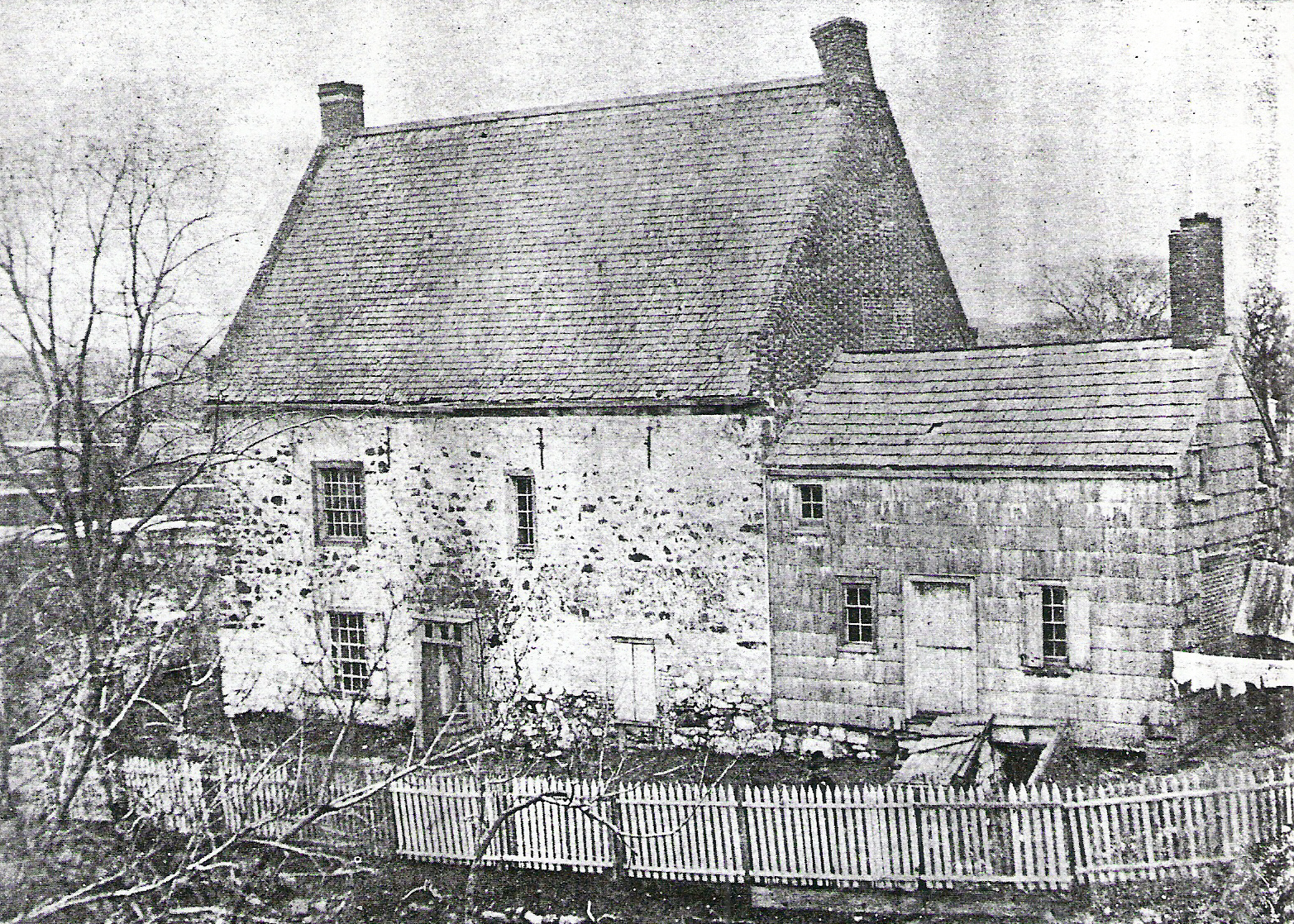
The front of the original Vechte–Cortelyou House, where the Maryland troops commanded by Lord Stirling and Mordecai Gist made two attacks against over two thousand British troops in a rear-guard action that allowed a majority of Stirling's 1,600-strong command to escape.

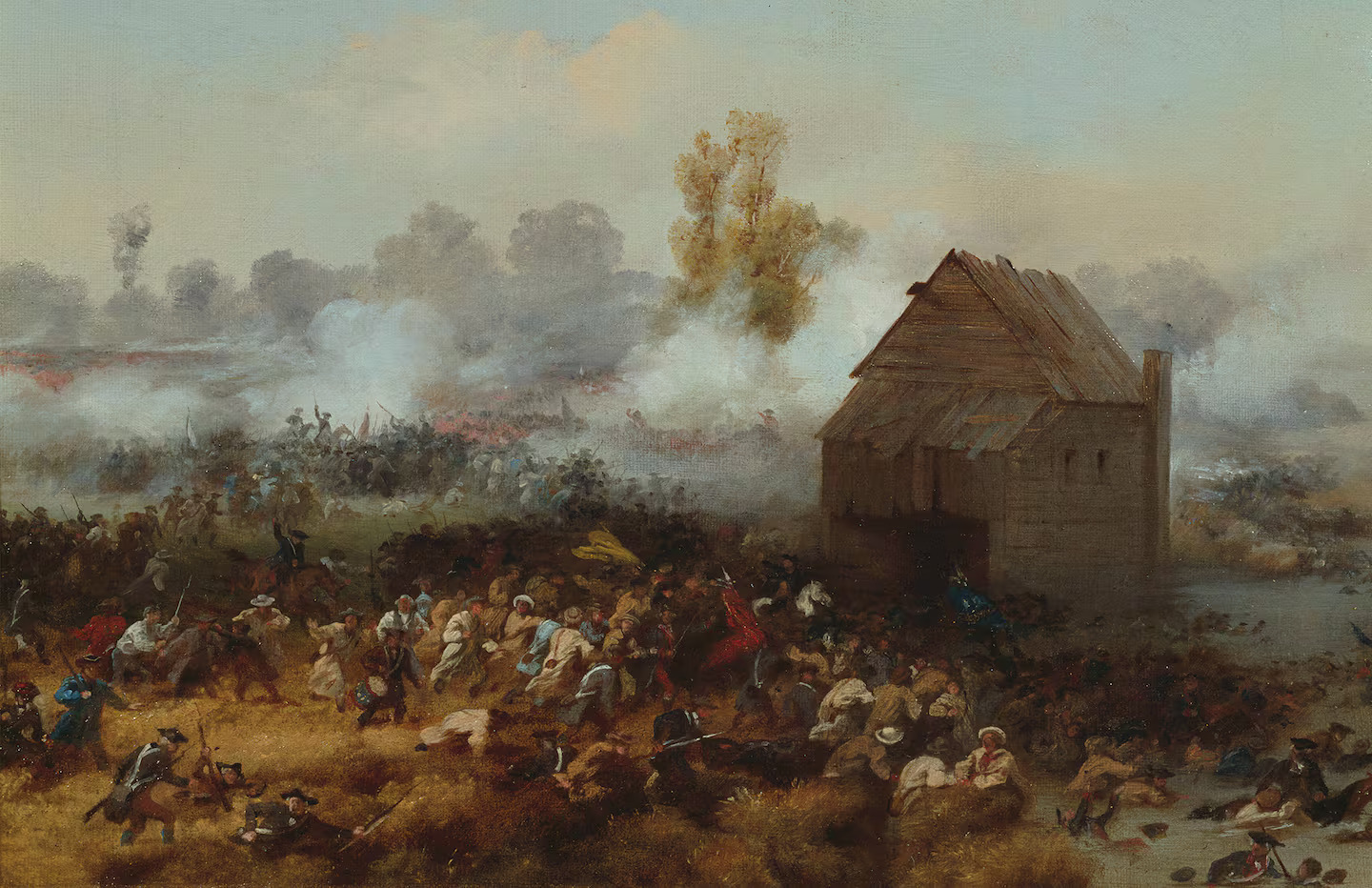
Gunpowder smoke from cannons and muskets marks where Stirling and the Maryland troops attack the British, while the rest of the American troops in the foreground escape across Brouwer's mill pond. The building pictured is the mill. (Battle of Long Island, Alonzo Chappel)

At 09:00, Washington arrived from Manhattan. He realized he had been wrong about a feint on Long Island, and he ordered more troops to Brooklyn from Manhattan. His location on the battlefield is not known because accounts differ, but most likely he was at Brooklyn Heights, where he could view the battle.

Stirling still held the line against Grant on the American right, to the west. He held on for four hours, still unaware of the British flanking maneuver, and some of his own troops thought they were winning the day because the British had been unable to take their position. However, Grant was reinforced by 2,000 marines, and he hit Stirling's center by 11:00, and Stirling was attacked on his left by the Hessians. Stirling pulled back, but British troops were coming at him from the rear, from the south up Gowanus Road. The only escape route left was across Brouwer's millpond on Gowanus Creek, which was 80 yards (240 ft; 73 m) wide, where the American defenses on Brooklyn Heights lay on the other side.

==== Maryland 400 ====
Stirling ordered all of his troops to cross the creek, except a contingent of Maryland troops under the command of Gist. This group became known to history as the "Maryland 400", although they numbered about 260–270 soldiers. Stirling and Gist led the troops in a rear-guard action against the overwhelming numbers of British troops, which surpassed 2,000, supported by two cannons. Stirling and Gist led the Marylanders in two attacks against the British, who were in fixed positions inside and in front of the Vechte–Cortelyou House (known today as the "Old Stone House"). After the last assault, the remaining troops retreated across Gowanus Creek.

Some of the men who tried to cross the marsh were bogged down in the mud and under musket fire, and others who could not swim were captured. Stirling was surrounded and, unwilling to surrender to the British, broke through their lines to von Heister's Hessians and surrendered to them. For years, mistaken claims have been made that 256 Maryland troops were killed in the assaults in front of the Old Stone House, and fewer than a dozen made it back to the American lines. However, more recent studies have concluded that is not correct. For example, in 2019 Professor William J. Parry concluded "256 Marylanders were not killed on the battlefield, more likely only about a tenth of that number." Washington watched from a redoubt on nearby Cobble Hill, at the intersection of today's Court Street and Atlantic Avenue, and reportedly said, "Good God, what brave fellows I must this day lose."

=== Disengagement ===
Continental Army troops who were not killed or captured escaped behind the fortified American position at Brooklyn Heights. Howe then ordered all of his troops to halt the attack, despite the protests of many officers in his command who believed they should push on to Brooklyn Heights. Howe had decided against a direct frontal assault on the entrenched American positions, choosing instead to begin a siege and setting up lines of circumvallation around the American positions. He believed the Americans to be essentially trapped, with his troops blocking escape by land and the Royal Navy in control of the East River, which they would have to cross to reach Manhattan Island.

Howe's failure to press the attack and the reasons for it have been disputed. He may have wished to avoid the casualties his army suffered when attacking the Continentals under similar circumstances at the Battle of Bunker Hill. He may also have been allowing Washington to conclude his position was hopeless and surrender, in the European gentleman-officer tradition. Howe told Parliament in 1779 his essential duty was to avoid excessive British casualties for an insufficient purpose, and capturing Brooklyn Heights would likely not have meant capturing the entire Continental army. "The most essential duty I had to observe was not wantonly to commit his majesty's troops, where the object was inadequate. I knew well any considerable loss sustained by the army could not speedily, nor easily, be repaired. . . . The loss of 1,000, or perhaps 1,500 British troops, in carrying those lines, would have been but ill repaid by double that number of the enemy, could it have been supposed they would have suffered in that proportion."

== Aftermath ==
=== Retreat to Manhattan ===
Washington and the Continental Army were surrounded on Brooklyn Heights with the East River to their backs. As the day went on, the British began to dig trenches, slowly coming closer to the American defenses. By doing this, the British would not have to cross over open ground to assault the American defenses as they did in Boston the year before. Despite this perilous situation, Washington ordered 1,200 more soldiers from Manhattan to Brooklyn on August 28, and two Pennsylvania regiments and Colonel John Glover's regiment from Marblehead, Massachusetts responded to Washington, sending troops. Thomas Mifflin, who commanded the Pennsylvania troops after arriving, volunteered to inspect the outer defenses and report back to Washington. In these outer defenses, small skirmishes were still taking place. On the afternoon of August 28, rainfall began, and Washington had his cannons bombard the British well into the night.

As the rain continued, Washington sent a letter instructing General William Heath, who was at Kings Bridge over the Harlem River between Manhattan and what is now The Bronx, to send every flat-bottomed boat and sloop without delay, in case battalions of infantry from New Jersey came to reinforce their position. At 16:00 on August 29, Washington held a meeting with his generals. Mifflin advised Washington to retreat to Manhattan while Mifflin and his Pennsylvania regiments made up the rear guard, holding the line until the rest of the army had withdrawn. The generals agreed unanimously with Mifflin retreat was the best option, and Washington had orders go out by the evening. The troops were told they were to gather up all their ammunition and baggage and prepare for a night attack. By 21:00, the sick and wounded began to move to the Brooklyn Ferry in preparation for evacuation. At 23:00, Glover and his Massachusetts men, who were sailors and fishermen, began to evacuate the troops.

As more troops were evacuated, more were ordered to withdraw from the lines and march to the ferry landing. Wagon wheels were muffled, and soldiers were forbidden to talk. Mifflin's rear guard was tending campfires to deceive the British. At 04:00, on August 30, Mifflin was informed it was his unit's turn to evacuate. Mifflin told the officer who had been sent to order him to leave, Major Alexander Scammell, he must be mistaken, but Scammell insisted he was not, and Mifflin ordered his troops to move out. When Mifflin's troops were within a half mile of the ferry landing, Washington rode up and demanded to know why they were not at their defenses. Edward Hand, who was leading the troops, tried to explain what had happened, but Mifflin arrived shortly. Washington exclaimed "Good God. General Mifflin, I am afraid you have ruined us." Mifflin explained that he had been told it was his turn to evacuate by Scammell; Washington told him it had been a mistake. Mifflin then led his troops back to the outer defenses.

Artillery, supplies, and troops were all being evacuated across the river at this time, but it was not going as fast as Washington had anticipated, and daybreak soon came. A fog settled in and concealed the evacuation from the British. British patrols noticed there did not seem to be any American pickets and thus began to search the area. While they were doing this, Washington, the last soldier left, stepped onto the last boat. At 07:00, the last American troops landed in Manhattan. All 9,000 troops had been evacuated with no loss of life.

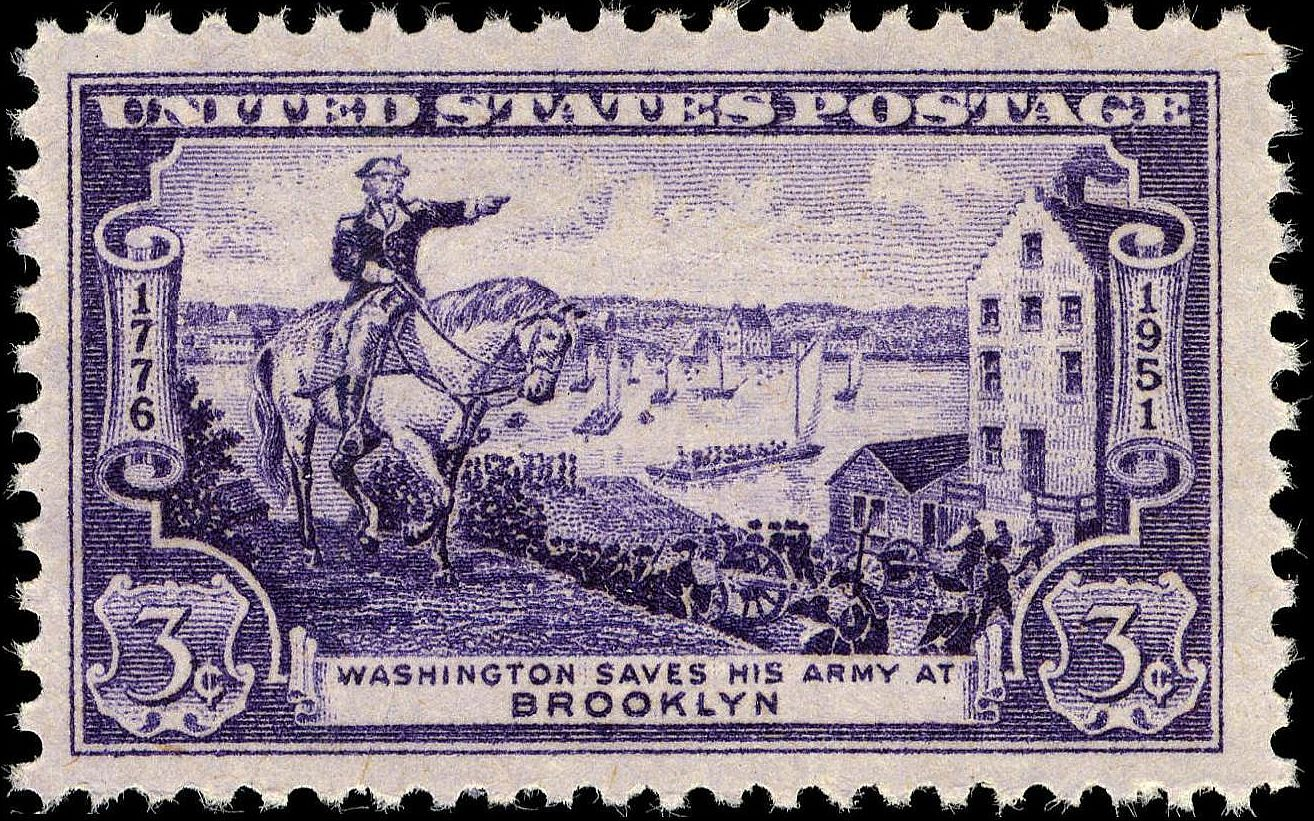
Washington evacuating Army, a 175th anniversary issue, published in 1951 and depicting Fulton Ferry House (on right) and flat-bottomed ferry boats in the East River (in background)

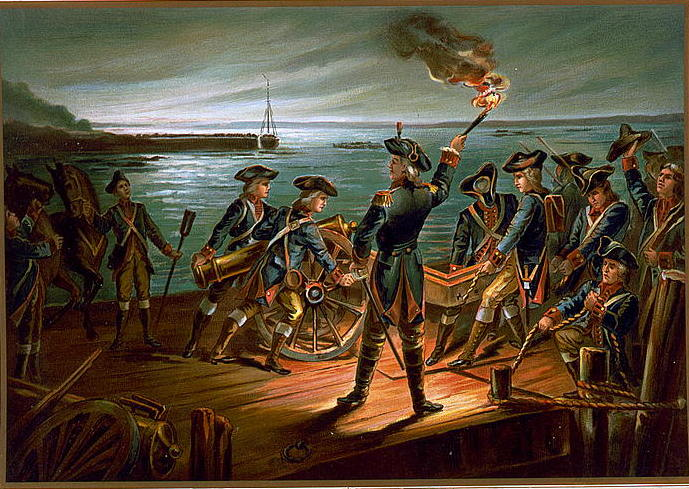
U.S. Army – Artillery Retreat from Long Island 1776, an 1899 portrait

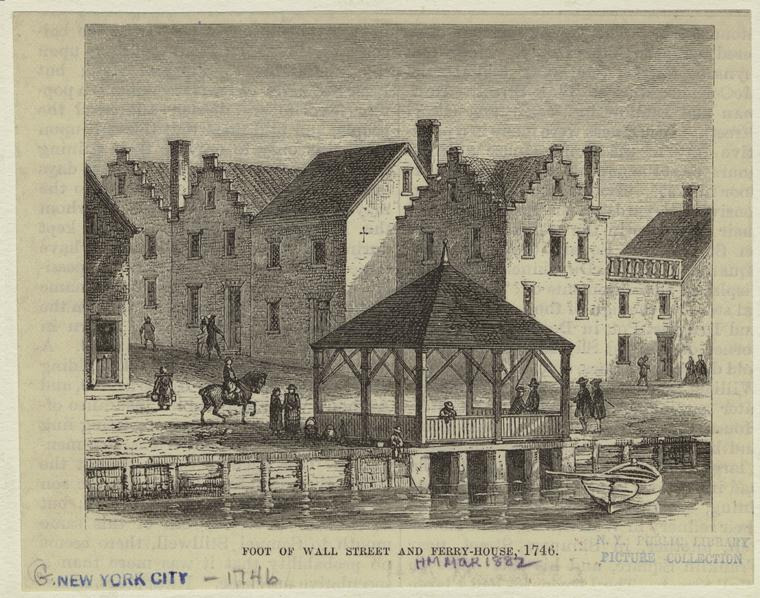
The Foot of Wall Street and Ferry House – 1746, a portrait depicting the Manhattan side of the East River crossing, known then as the Brooklyn Ferry, as it appeared in the mid-1700s.

=== Conclusion of the campaign ===
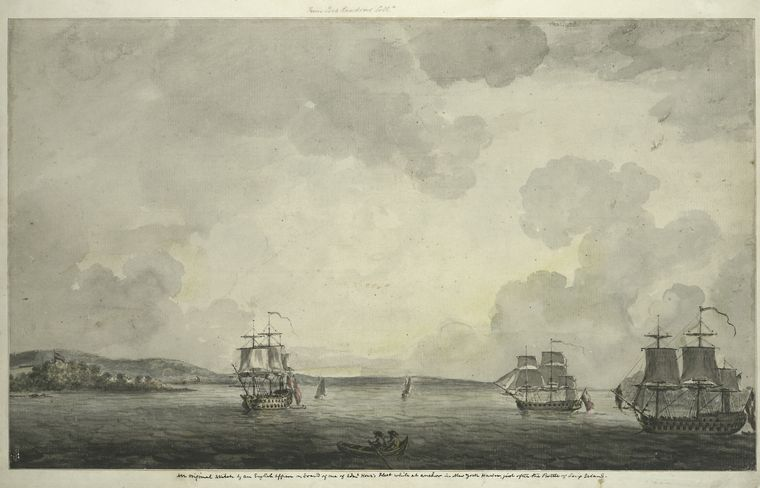
The British fleet in New York Harbor following the battle

The British were stunned to find Washington and the Continental Army had escaped. Later that day on August 30, British troops occupied the Continental Army's abandoned fortifications. When news of the battle reached London, it led to many celebratory festivities. Bells were rung across the city, candles were lit in windows, and King George III awarded Howe the Order of the Bath. Washington's defeat, in the opinions of some, revealed his deficiencies as a military strategist. Splitting his forces resulted in his largely inexperienced generals misunderstanding the state of the battle, and his raw troops fled in disorder at the first shots. However, Washington and the Continental Army's daring retreat later that night has been seen by some historians as one of General Washington's greatest military accomplishments. Other historians concentrate on the failure of British naval forces to prevent the withdrawal.

Howe remained inactive for the next half month, not attacking until September 15 when he landed a force at Kip's Bay. The British quickly occupied the city. Although American troops delivered an unexpected check to the British at Harlem Heights in mid-September, Howe defeated Washington in battle again at White Plains and then again at Fort Washington. Because of these defeats, Washington and the army retreated across New Jersey and into Pennsylvania.

=== Casualties ===
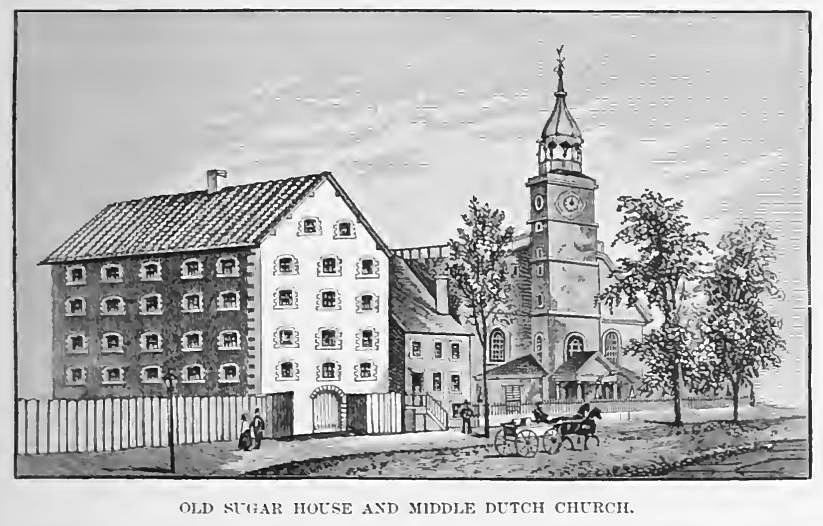
Old Sugar House and Middle Dutch Church, depicted circa 1830, was a British Army prison that housed some of Washington's soldiers that were captured during their retreat in the battle; the site today is the location of 28 Liberty Street, a 60-floor Manhattan skyscraper.

At the time, it was by far the largest battle ever fought in North America. If the Royal Navy is included, over 40,000 troops took part in the battle. Howe reported his losses as 60 killed, 267 wounded, and 31 missing. The Hessian casualties were 5 killed and 26 wounded. The Americans suffered much heavier losses. About 300 had been killed and over 1,000 captured. As few as half of the prisoners survived. Kept on prison ships in Wallabout Bay, then transferred to locations such as the Middle Dutch Church, they were starved and denied medical attention. In their weakened condition, many succumbed to smallpox.

For years there have been assertions that 256 soldiers of the First Maryland Regiment under Colonel William Smallwood fell in the battle, about two-thirds of the regiment, and that they later were buried in a mass grave, but the grave's exact location has been a mystery for 250 years. Some have mistakenly asserted that 256 dead troops of the Maryland 400 were buried by the British in a mass grave on a hillock on farmer Adrian Van Brunt's land on the outskirts of the marsh. That alleged mass grave was said to be around the southwest corner of what is today Third Avenue, between Seventh and Eighth Streets. However, more recent scholars such as William J. Parry have concluded: "It is highly likely that those who were killed were interred in widely-scattered shallow graves close to the spots where they fell (or left unburied)." Thus, the purported mass grave is only a legend not based on currently-accepted facts.

== Legacy ==
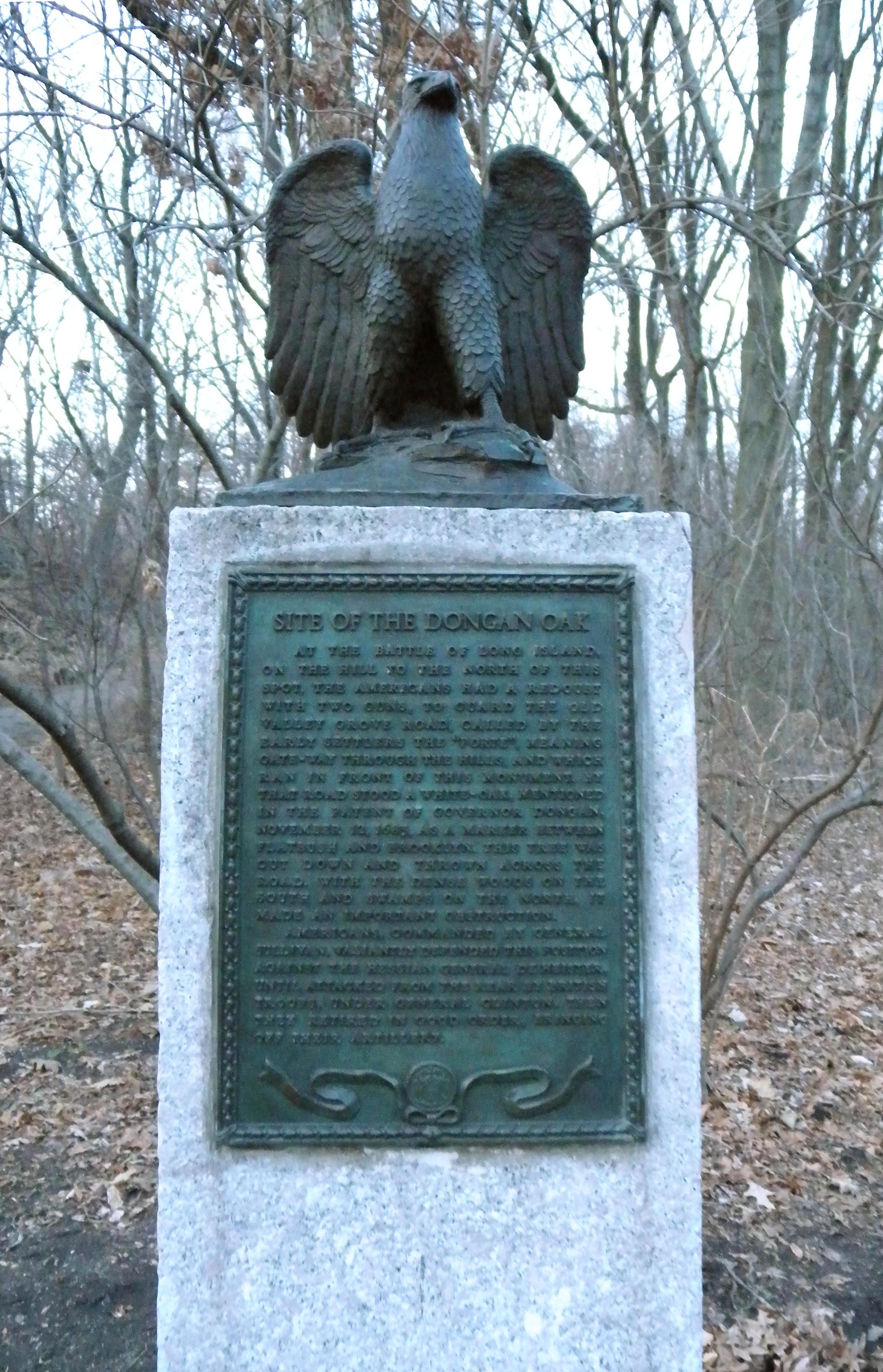
Dongan Oak memorial in Brooklyn's Prospect Park

The most significant legacy of the Battle of Long Island was that it showed there would be no easy victory and the war would be long and bloody. The British took control of the strategically vital harbor and put New York City under military occupation until the treaty ending the war was signed. With the British military command in residence, the city became the focal point for espionage and intelligence gathering. The area surrounding the city and the harbor remained in a near-constant state of conflict as a forage-war harassed the surrounding communities.

Commemorations of the battle include:

- The Altar to Liberty: Minerva monument: The battle is commemorated with a monument, which includes a bronze statue of Minerva near the top of Battle Hill, the highest point of Brooklyn, in Greenwood Cemetery. The statue was sculpted by Frederick Ruckstull and unveiled in 1920. The statue stands in the northwest corner of the cemetery and gazes directly at the Statue of Liberty in New York Harbor. In 2006, the Minerva statue was invoked in a successful defense to prevent a building from blocking the line of sight from the cemetery to the Statue of Liberty in the harbor. The annual Battle of Long Island commemoration begins inside the main Gothic arch entrance to Greenwood Cemetery and marches up Battle Hill to ceremonies at the monument.
- The Prison Ship Martyrs' Monument: A freestanding Doric column in Fort Greene memorializing all those who died while kept prisoner on the British ships just off the shore of Brooklyn, in Wallabout Bay.
- Soldiers' Monument – Milford, Connecticut. Memorializes the 200 seriously ill prisoners of the Battle of Long Island who were dumped on the beach at Milford on the night of January 3, 1777.
- The Old Stone House: A reconstructed farmhouse (c. 1699) that was at the center of the Marylanders' delaying actions serves as a museum of the battle. It is located in J. J. Byrne Park, at Third Street and Fifth Avenue, Brooklyn, and features models and maps.
- Prospect Park, Brooklyn, Battle Pass: along the eastern side of East Drive is a large granite boulder with a brass plaque affixed, and another marker lies near the road for the Dongan Oak, a very large and old tree felled to block the pass from the British advance. In addition, in the park resides the Line of Defense marker erected by the Sons of the American Revolution and, near the eastern edge of Long Meadow, the Maryland Monument & Maryland Memorial Corinthian column.

Thirty-two units in the U.S. Army have lineages that go back to the colonial and revolutionary eras. Derived from American units that participated in the Battle of Long Island are five Army National Guard units (101st Eng Bn, 125th MP Co, 175th Inf, 181st Inf, and 198th Sig Bn) and one Regular Army Field Artillery battalion (1st Bn, 5th FA).

== See also ==
- American Revolutionary War §British New York counter-offensive. The 'Battle of Long Island' is placed in overall sequence and strategic context.
- Dr. John Hart, Regimental Surgeon of Col Prescott's Regiment, who was stationed at Governor's Island
- List of American Revolutionary War battles
- Long Island order of battle
- New York and New Jersey campaign
