= James Grant (British Army officer, born 1720) =

British Army officer, colonial administrator and politician (1720–1806)

General James Grant
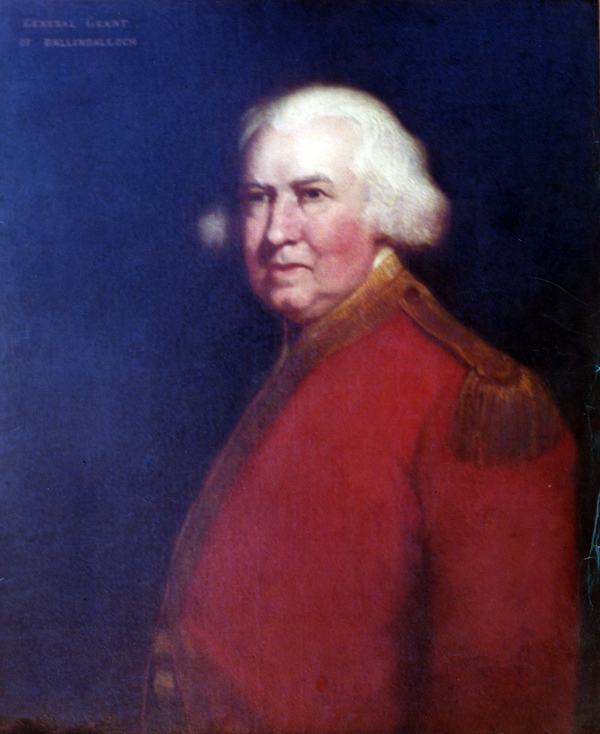
- Portrait of Grant, c. 1770

Governor of East Florida
- In office 29 Aug 1764 – 9 May 1771
- Preceded by: Francis Ogilvie
- Succeeded by: John Moultrie

Member of Parliament for Sutherland
- In office 1787–1802
- Preceded by: William Wemyss
- Succeeded by: William Dundas

Member of Parliament for Tain Burghs
- In office 1773–1780
- Preceded by: Hon. Alexander Mackay
- Succeeded by: Charles Ross

Personal details
- Born: 1720 Ballindalloch, Scotland
- Died: 13 April 1806 (aged 85–86)

Military service
- Allegiance: Great Britain; United Kingdom
- Branch/service: British Army
- Years of service: 1744–1805
- Rank: Major general
- Commands: 77th Regiment of Foot (1757–1763); 55th Regiment of Foot (1775–1791); 11th Regiment of Foot (1791–1796)
- Battles/wars: War of the Austrian Succession; Battle of Fontenoy; French and Indian War; Battle of Fort Duquesne; Anglo-Cherokee War; Siege of Havana; American War of Independence; Battle of Bunker Hill; New York Campaign; Battle of Long Island; Battle of White Plains; Philadelphia campaign; Battle of Brandywine Creek; Battle of Barren Hill; Battle of La Vigie

General James Grant, 4th of Ballindalloch (1720 – 13 April 1806) was a British Army officer, colonial administrator and politician who served in the War of the Austrian Succession, French and Indian War and American War of Independence. He served as the governor of East Florida from 1763 to 1771, and between 1773 and 1802 sat in the British House of Commons.

== Early career ==
Grant was born on the family estate of Ballindalloch in Banffshire in the Northeast of Scotland. He began his military career by purchasing a commission as captain in the Royal Scots on 24 October 1744. The regiment was shipped to the Continent and Grant fought with them in the Battle of Fontenoy during the War of the Austrian Succession.

== French and Indian War ==
By 1757, Grant was a major of the 77th Regiment of Foot (Montgomerie's Highlanders), fighting in the French and Indian War in the British Thirteen Colonies. In 1758, he led part of the regiment in an expedition led by General John Forbes. On this expedition, he became acquainted with others who would also play larger parts in the American Revolutionary War: George Washington, Francis Marion, and Hugh Mercer, among others. He also gained a contempt for the colonial or militia troops that would colour his later views.

In September, Grant was assigned to lead an advance party of around 800 men to determine the French strength at Fort Duquesne (the future site of Pittsburgh). The force was made up mainly of militia, but he took along a number of officers from the regulars since he had little respect for the colonial troops. He decided to split his force, hoping to encourage a French attack that he could surprise and overwhelm. Having no wilderness experience, he was ambushed himself by Indians and French on 14 September 1758. At this engagement, the Battle of Fort Duquesne, the British force was repelled with 342 men killed, wounded or captured. The prisoners consisted of Major Grant and 18 of his men. He was paroled soon after and tried to blame his defeat on the failure of the colonial militia to follow orders.

In 1761, Grant commanded an expedition against the Cherokee during the Anglo-Cherokee War.

After being briefly stationed at Fort Ticonderoga, his regiment was moved to the Caribbean Theatre of the Seven Years' War. They fought at the Siege of Havana, held by Spanish forces in Cuba, which ended in the surrender of the city to the British. When the war was over, the regiment was disbanded in America in 1763.

== Governor of Florida ==
With the Treaty of Paris, Britain gained control of Florida from the Spanish. They divided it into two colonies, and James Grant was named governor of East Florida in 1764. He moved to the capital of East Florida at St. Augustine and resided in the Governor's House. He ended Indian raids with the Treaty of Fort Picolata, an attempt to maintain peaceful relations between American Indian groups and Florida colonists and to entice future immigrants to his colony. During the Anglo-Cherokee War of 1759–1761, Grant had become familiar with systems of gift exchange and reciprocity used by Southeast Indian groups, which he sought to implement in Florida. Grant also established the Florida-Georgia border.

Grant's ventures were ultimately profitable, but numerous efforts failed to produce results. He encouraged new agriculture, setting up trade in the commodities of cotton, indigo, timber, and cochineal. He personally gained and developed several plantations as grants.

Then, in 1771, illness forced him to return to Scotland. Grant was succeeded as Governor by General Patrick Tonyn, brother-in-law of English merchant and planter Francis Levett.

Grant left his overseer Alexander Skinner in charge of his enslaved Africans and his plantation Grant's Villa, seven miles north of St. Augustine. Skinner kept Grant informed of activities on the plantation through many letters from April 1771 until his death in March 1779. After Skinner's death, Grant appointed Dr. David Yeats, the Secretary of the East Florida Colony, as his agent to manage his plantations in his absence. As with Skinner's letters, Yeats' letters to Grant concerning the properties have long interested Florida colonial historians. Yeats named his son Grant David Yeats after Grant. Grant D. Yeats (1773–1836) became a noted English physician, author and mayor of Bedford.

Back home in Scotland, Grant was elected to Parliament in 1773 as an MP for Tain Burghs. In the period leading up to the American Revolutionary War, he became one of the most outspoken of the anti-American members in Parliament. In a speech early in 1775, he remarked that the colonists "...could not fight...", and declared that he could "go from one end of America to other and geld all the males."

== American War of Independence ==
By the summer of 1775, Grant returned to active service with the rank of colonel. He was ordered to return to North America. He arrived in Boston, Massachusetts, on 30 July. In the aftermath of the Battle of Bunker Hill, he urged General Gage to move the British troops to New York City, so that they would have room to manoeuvre. His advice was ignored at the time. Grant was a supernumerary until December when he was made colonel and commander of the 55th Regiment of Foot. He would hold that command until 1791.

His prediction that Boston was an untenable position was proved correct the following spring. On 17 March 1776, he accompanied the general withdrawal of British troops to Halifax, Nova Scotia. By the summer of 1776, General William Howe had replaced Gage as commander, and took Grant's advice about securing New York. Grant was given the provisional rank of major-general and played several key parts in Howe's movements. Fortunately for the Americans, Howe refused some advice from Grant, who proposed burning Boston, Marblehead, Massachusetts; New York City, and Philadelphia.

=== Battle for New York ===
As the British tried to gain control of the major port city in the New York Campaign, Grant had become Howe's primary planning officer. He developed two plans, each designed to both gain control of territory and to deal a serious or fatal blow to the Continental Army. These resulted in the Battle of Brooklyn, and Battle of White Plains. Both of these were British victories, as was the overall campaign, but General Washington avoided the death blow to his troops each time.

In the Battle of Long Island on 26 and 27 August, Major General Grant led the division that landed on the left wing. He was to engage the American right and divert attention from Howe's flanking manoeuvre with the main body. An advance unit of his troops engaged the Americans at the Red Lion Inn, which was the first engagement of the battle. Grant completed his mission, and strongly defeated the American General William Alexander's division.

After the event, Grant was criticised by some for allowing the escape of most of this force. He had almost 7,000 men in ten regiments opposing Alexander's 1,600 Continentals, but there were factors at play other than troop strength. First, Grant stopped his advance according to the British plan, awaiting Howe's attack on the American rear, rather than attacking the Americans who were dug in on the Brooklyn heights. Second, he was running low on ammunition. Boats and logistic support were busy ferrying and supplying the Hessian units on the right and the main body that was landing at Gravesend, Brooklyn.

Grant quick-marched his battalion to the Battle of White Plains, but he arrived too late. In 1777, Grant devised the battle plans for the Battle of Brandywine Creek.

=== Philadelphia and the West Indies ===
Grant was unsuccessful in trapping Gilbert du Motier, marquis de Lafayette, at the Battle of Barren Hill, on 20 May 1778. Lafayette held the position along the Schuylkill River with 2,200 troops and five guns. His front was picketed by 150 light infantry and 50 Oneida Indians under Allen McLane and his left was held by James Potter and 600 Pennsylvania militia. The bulk of his command was formed by a veteran brigade under Enoch Poor. Sir William Howe sent Grant with 6,000 men and 15 guns to circle wide to the right and come in behind Lafayette's force, while he attacked in front with 4,000 soldiers. Charles Grey with 2,000 British and Hessian grenadiers was ordered to strike the American left flank. The manoeuvre began auspiciously when Potter's militia dispersed in the face of Grant's column. However, the capture of two of Grey's soldiers warned Lafayette of his danger. Meanwhile, Grant halted his troops to wait for Grey to appear and this allowed the Americans to begin moving back to Matson's Ford. When Grant finally lurched forward again, Lafayette sent some of Poor's troops forward in a feint. Grant was fooled and stopped his advance a second time. By the time he realised what was happening, most of the Americans had slipped out of his grasp via a road that the British were not aware of. Grant nevertheless unleashed his cavalry in pursuit, but they took the wrong route and only arrived in time to see the last of Lafayette's men crossing at Matson's.

Finally, Grant was shipped off to the West Indies. On 27 October 1778 he led a successful expeditionary force to capture the French West Indian island of St. Lucia. A superior French garrison, surrendered on 28 December, at the Battle of La Vigie.

On 1 April 1779, Lord Germain instructed Grant to establish small garrisons throughout the West Indies. Grant had the moral courage to defy Germain and refused to carry out this order. In his letters of 8 and 17 July, he pointed out to the Secretary of State for America that naval superiority was paramount and that the small detachments on every island would not be wise. Instead, he deployed the West Indies garrisons to cover the major naval bases. He posted the 15th, 28th, and 55th Foot and 1,500 gunners at Saint Kitts. The 27th, 35th, and 49th Foot and 1,600 gunners defended Saint Lucia. Meanwhile, the royal dockyard at Antigua was held by an 800-man garrison of the 40th and 60th Foot. Grant also reinforced the fleet with 925 soldiers. He embarked for England on 1 August 1779, but his dispositions provided the basis for the British successes in the Caribbean during the final years of the war.

== Later career ==
In 1780, he was defeated in parliamentary elections. In 1782, he was appointed a lieutenant general. In 1787, he was re-elected to Parliament, this time for Sutherland. He held the seat until 1802.

In 1789, he was appointed governor of Stirling Castle, and commanding general of the army in Scotland. In 1791, he was transferred from the 55th as Colonel to the 11th Foot. In 1796, he was appointed a full General and retired from active military services. In 1802, he retired to his estate on the Avon and Spey rivers as the Laird of Ballindalloch, after relinquishing his seat in Parliament. In 1805, he retired from the British army. He died at 86 on 13 April 1806. His estate went to his grandnephew, George Macpherson.

His papers are at the National Archives of Scotland and have been copied for the Library of Congress.

Parliament of Great Britain
Preceded by Hon. Alexander Mackay	Member of Parliament for Tain Burghs; 1773–1780	Succeeded by Charles Ross
Preceded by William Wemyss	Member of Parliament for Sutherland; 1787–1800	Succeeded by Parliament of the United Kingdom
Parliament of the United Kingdom
Preceded by Parliament of Great Britain	Member of Parliament for Sutherland; 1801– 1802	Succeeded by William Dundas
Military offices
Preceded by Manuel de Montiano, Governor of Spanish Florida	Governor of British East Florida; 1763–1771	Succeeded by Major John Moultrie
Preceded by Robert Pigot	Colonel of the 55th (Westmorland) Regiment of Foot; 1775–1791	Succeeded by Loftus Tottenham
Preceded by Francis Smith	Colonel of the 11th (the North Devonshire) Regiment of Foot; 1791–1806	Succeeded by Hon. Richard FitzPatrick
