= Wemyss =

Wemyss can refer to:

== Places ==
- Wemyss, Fife, a civil parish on the south coast of Fife, Scotland, lying on the Firth of Forth.
- Wemyss Bay, a large village in Inverclyde, Scotland
  - Wemyss Bay railway station, a terminus on the Inverclyde Line
  - Castle Wemyss, a demolished mansion in Wemyss Bay, Scotland
- Coaltown of Wemyss, a village in the Wemyss area of Fife, Scotland
- East Wemyss, a village on the south coast of Fife, Scotland
- Wemyss Castle, a castle in Wemyss on the cliffs between East and West Wemyss
- Wemyss Cave, a cave in Fife, Scotland, where very early prehistoric art was found
- West Wemyss, a village on the north shore of the Firth of Forth, in Fife, Scotland

== People ==
- Clan Wemyss, a Lowland Scottish clan
- Earl of Wemyss and March, two titles in the Peerage of Scotland held by a joint holder since 1826
- James Wemyss (disambiguation), multiple people

- James Wemyss, Lord Burntisland (died 1682), husband of Margaret Wemyss, 3rd Countess of Wemyss
- James Wemyss, 5th Earl of Wemyss (1699–1756), grandson of the preceding, Scottish peer
- James Wemyss (1726–1786), son of the preceding, Scottish MP
- James Erskine Wemyss (1789–1854), grandson of the preceding, Scottish admiral and MP
- James Hay Erskine Wemyss (1829–1864), son of the preceding, Scottish MP
- James Wemyss (New Zealand politician) (1828–1909), Member of Parliament in Nelson, New Zealand
- James Wemyss (British Army officer) (1748–1833), major during American Revolutionary War at Battle of Fishdam Ford

- John Wemyss (disambiguation), multiple people

- John Wemyss (minister) (c. 1579–1636), Church of Scotland minister, Hebrew scholar and exegete
- Sir John Wemyss (landowner) (1557–1624), Scottish landowner
- John Wemyss, 1st Earl of Wemyss (1586–1649), his son, Scottish politician
- John Wemyss of Logie (1569–1596), Scottish courtier and spy

- Kathy Wemyss, Australian rock musician
- Mary Wemyss (1868–1951), English novelist
- Rosslyn Wemyss, 1st Baron Wester Wemyss (1864–1933), British admiral of the fleet
- Wemyss Mackenzie Simpson (1824–1894), Canadian fur-trader and political figure
- Yuan Wemyss (born 1976), China-born Scottish badminton player

== Other ==
- Wemyss Ware, a type of pottery
- Wemys, a character's middle name in Lord of the Flies

== See also ==
- Weems (disambiguation)
