= James Wemyss =

James Wemyss may refer to:

- James Wemyss, Lord Burntisland (died 1682), husband of Margaret Wemyss, 3rd Countess of Wemyss
- James Wemyss, 5th Earl of Wemyss (1699–1756), grandson of the preceding, Scottish peer
- James Wemyss (1726–1786), son of the preceding, Scottish MP
- James Erskine Wemyss (1789–1854), grandson of the preceding, Scottish admiral and MP
- James Hay Erskine Wemyss (1829–1864), son of the preceding, Scottish MP
- James Wemyss (New Zealand politician) (1828–1909), Member of Parliament in Nelson, New Zealand
- James Wemyss (British Army officer) (1748–1833), major during American Revolutionary War at Battle of Fishdam Ford

== See also ==
- James Weams (1851–1911), aka James Wemyss, Durham comedian and singer/songwriter
