= Queen's Rangers =

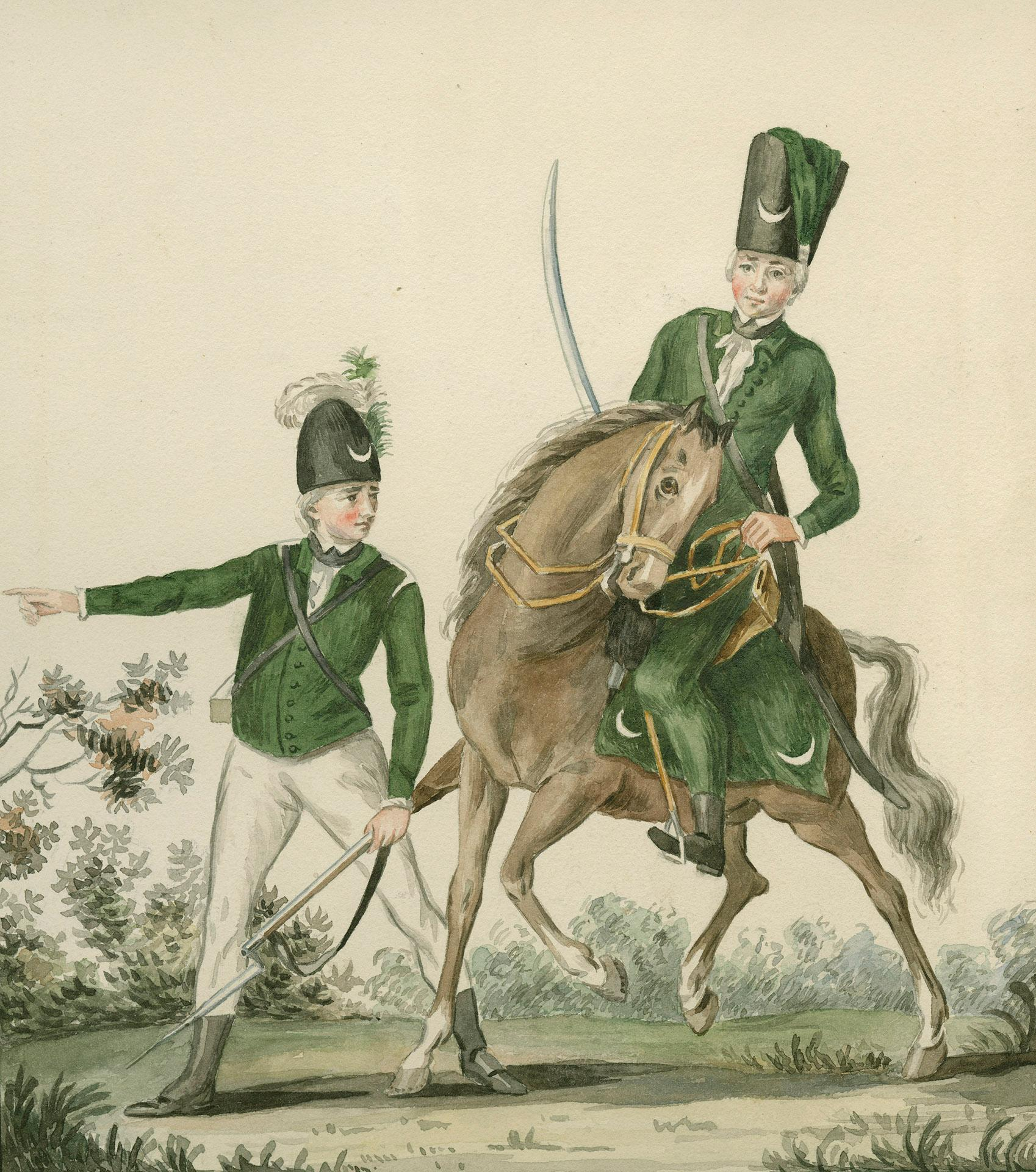
- A regimental light infantryman and hussar
- Active: 1776–1783; 1791–1802; 1837–1838
- Country: Great Britain; United Kingdom
- Allegiance: British Army
- Branch: British provincial rangers unit
- Type: Dragoon; Light infantry
- Role: Cavalry tactics Close combat Irregular warfare Maneuver warfare Patrolling; Raiding; Reconnaissance; Screening; Tracking
- Size: Company
- Garrison/HQ: Fort William Henry (1755–1757); Rogers Island (1757–1763); Fort Detroit (1763–1796)
- Nicknames: Queen's American Rangers, Simcoe's Rangers
- Engagements: American Revolutionary War: New York Campaign (1776); Philadelphia Campaign (1777–1778); Siege of Charleston (1780); Rebellions of 1837–1838: Upper Canada Rebellion

Commanders
- Notable commanders: Colonel Paul Dudley Sargent; Lieutenant Colonel Robert Rogers; Lieutenant Colonel James Wemyss; Lieutenant Colonel John Graves Simcoe; Samuel Jarvis

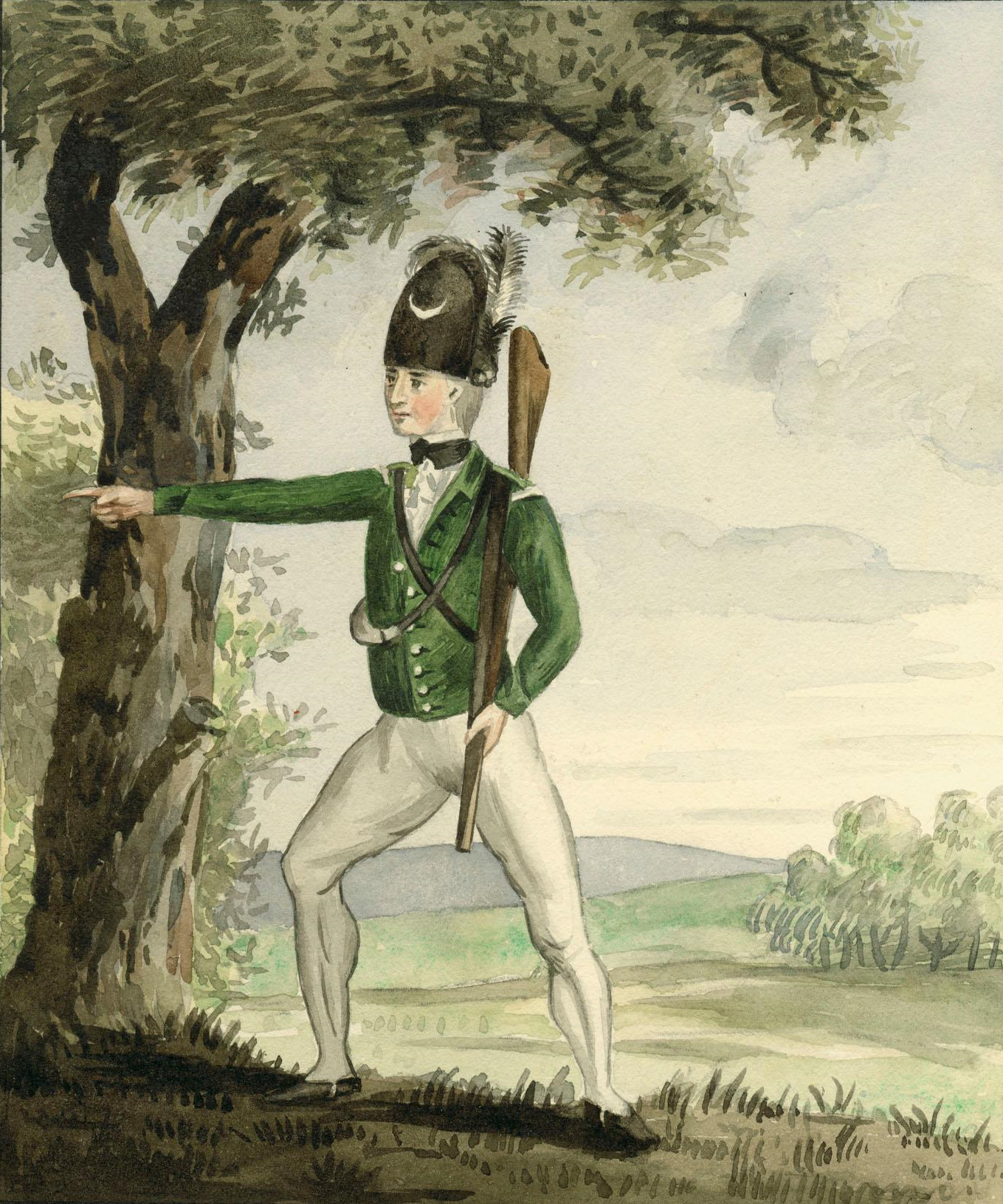
A rifleman of the Queen's Rangers, ca. 1780

The Queen's Rangers, also known as the Queen's American Rangers, and later Simcoe's Rangers, were a Loyalist military unit of the American Revolutionary War that engaged in cavalry tactics, close combat, irregular warfare, maneuver warfare, raiding, reconnaissance, screening, and tracking. Formed in 1776, they were named for Queen Charlotte. The Queen's Rangers was a light corps in the tradition of British rangers during the Seven Years' War, operating on the flanks and in advance of Crown forces, manning outposts, conducting patrols for screening, and carrying out raiding and reconnaissance operations.

A low number of Black Loyalists served in the Queen's Rangers, such as the trumpeter Barnard E. Griffiths. After the war, the Rangers were removed to the British colony of Nova Scotia and disbanded. On September 1, 1791, the regiment was re-formed as the Queen's Rangers under Colonel Commandant John Graves Simcoe.

== French and Indian War ==
The origins of the Queen's Rangers began in the Seven Years' War (French and Indian War), during which France and Great Britain fought for territories in the New World. At first, French-Canadian habitants and their Indian allies were quite effective in employing guerrilla tactics against the British regulars. To counter the French tactics, Robert Rogers raised companies of New England frontiersmen for the British and trained them in woodcraft, scouting, and irregular warfare, sending them on raids along the frontiers of New France as Rogers' Rangers.

The Rangers soon gained a considerable reputation, particularly in the campaigning in upstate New York around Fort Ticonderoga and Lake Champlain. They also launched a long-range raid to destroy Indian allies in the St. Lawrence valley, gained the first lodgement in the amphibious landings on Cape Breton to capture Louisbourg, and took the surrender of the French outposts in the upper Great Lakes after the war.

== American Revolutionary War ==
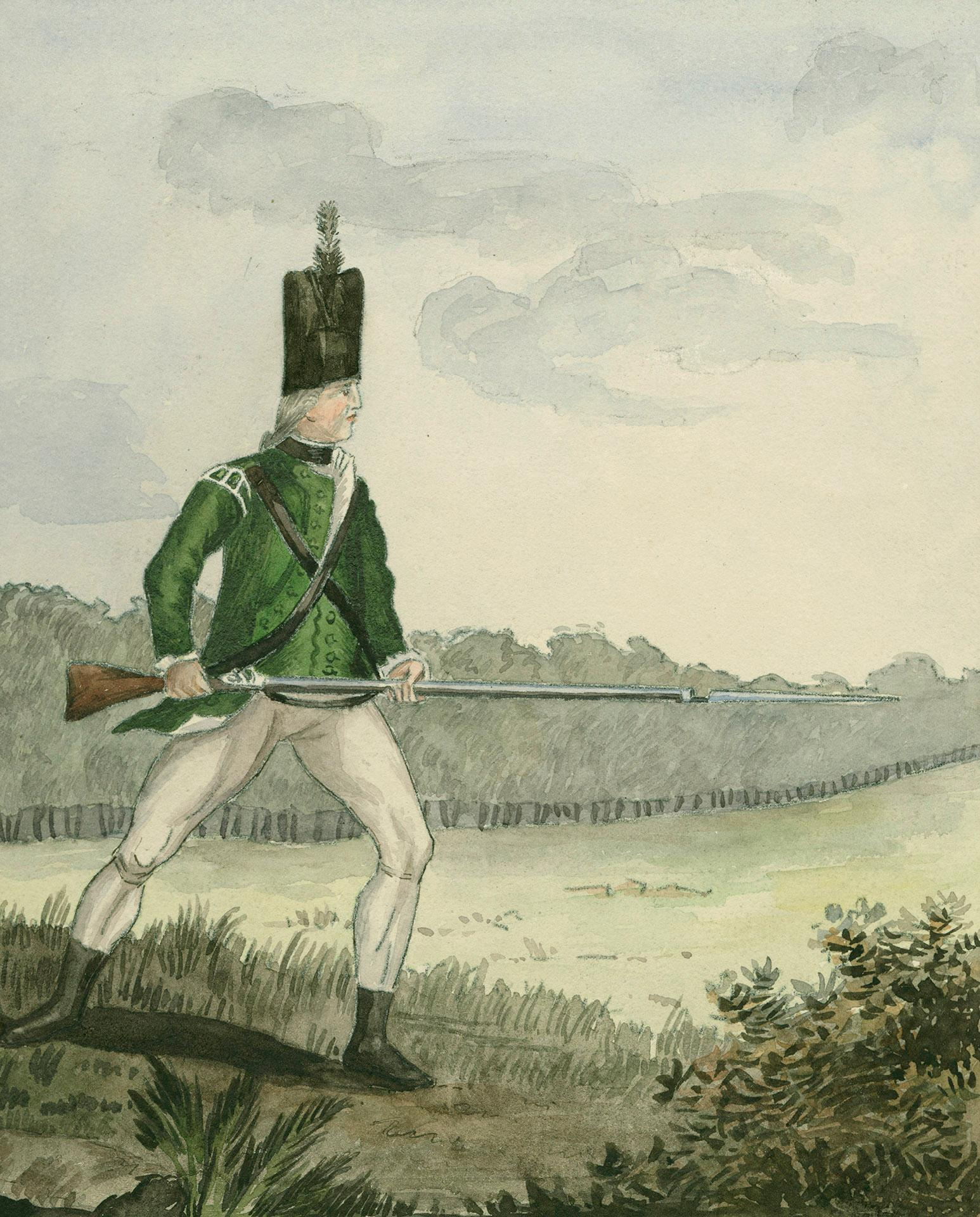
A grenadier of the Queen's Rangers, ca. 1780

When the American Revolutionary War broke out in 1775, about fifty Loyalist regiments were raised, including the Butler's Rangers, the King's Royal Regiment, and the Maryland and Pennsylvania Loyalists. Robert Rogers again raised a unit, this time in New York (mostly from Loyalists living in Westchester and Long Island), from western Connecticut, and with men from the Queen's Loyal Virginia Regiment. The new unit was named in honour of Queen Charlotte. It first assembled on Staten Island in August 1776 and grew to 937 officers and men, organized into eleven companies of about thirty men each, and an additional five troops of cavalry.

The unit immediately set about building fortresses and redoubts, including the one that stood at Lookout Place. Rogers did not prove successful in this command, and he left the unit on January 29, 1777. The regiment had suffered serious losses in the Battle of Mamaroneck, a surprise attack on their outpost position at Mamaroneck, New York, on October 22, 1776. Eleven months later, on September 11, 1777, they distinguished themselves at the Battle of Brandywine, suffering many casualties while attacking entrenched American positions. They were then commanded by then Major James Wemyss, who would later resign from the Rangers and become a LTC. stationed in South Carolina. On October 15, 1777, John Graves Simcoe was given command, when the unit became known informally as "Simcoe's Rangers".

John Graves Simcoe turned the Queen's Rangers into one of the most successful British regiments in the war. They provided escort and patrol duty around Philadelphia (1777–8); fought in the Philadelphia Campaign; served as rearguard during the British retreat to New York (1778); fought the Stockbridge Militia in The Bronx (1778); fought on October 26, 1779, at Perth Amboy, New Jersey, where Simcoe was captured but freed in a prisoner exchange on December 31, 1779; at Charlestown, South Carolina (1780); in the raid on Richmond, Virginia with Benedict Arnold and in other raids in Virginia (1780–1).

The unit surrendered at Yorktown, its rank and file imprisoned at Winchester, Virginia. Earlier, on May 2, 1779, the regiment was taken into the American establishment as the 1st American Regiment and was later, on December 25, 1782, taken into the British establishment. In 1783, when the war ended by the Treaty of Paris, the Queen's Rangers left New York for Nova Scotia, where it was disbanded. Many of the men from the unit formed Queensbury, New Brunswick on land grants.

== Post-war years ==
After 1791, when Simcoe was named lieutenant governor of the newly created Upper Canada, the Queen's Rangers was revived to form the core of the defence forces. The leaders were mostly veterans of the American War of Independence. Although there was little military action during this period, the Rangers were instrumental in building Upper Canada through Simcoe's road-building campaign. In 1795–6, they blazed the trail for Yonge Street, and then turned to Dundas Street and Kingston Road. They also built the original Fort York, where they were stationed. The Queen's Rangers were again disbanded in 1802, with most of the men joining the York Militia. During the War of 1812, many of the disbanded rangers saw active service with the Upper Canadian militia.

During the Rebellions of 1837, Samuel Peters Jarvis raised a new Queen's Rangers out of the York Militia to fight the rebels, which again disbanded soon after being raised.

== Legacy ==
1791 portrait of John Graves Simcoe as the regiment's lieutenant colonel

A Canadian Army Reserve regiment called the Queen's York Rangers (1st American Regiment) traces its roots to the original Rogers' Rangers. In 2012, the Rangers were assigned the perpetuation of three War of 1812 units and received battle honours accordingly.

An Ontario historical plaque was erected in Yorktown, Virginia, by the province to commemorate the Queen's Rangers' role in Ontario's heritage.

An elementary school in Copetown, Ontario, was named after the Queen's Rangers in 1958. This school was closed in 2019.

The AMC series Turn: Washington's Spies, a historical drama based on the creation and operations of the Culper Ring during the American Revolutionary War, features the Queen's Rangers prominently along with notable commanders Robert Rogers and John Graves Simcoe as the main antagonists of Abraham Woodhull and the Culper Ring as a whole throughout the series four season run.

== Notable officers ==
- Lieutenant Colonel Robert Rogers: Commanded from August 26, 1776, to January 29, 1777. Former commander of Rogers' Rangers during the French and Indian War.
- Major Christopher French: Temporary Commander January 30 to May 4, 1777. Came from and returned to the 22nd Regiment of Foot.
- Major James Wemyss: Commanded May 5 to October 14, 1777. Came from the 40th Regiment of Foot. Later was the field commander of the 63rd Regiment during the Southern Campaign.
- Lieutenant Colonel John Graves Simcoe: Commanded October 15, 1777, to October 13, 1783. Came from the 40th Regiment of Foot.
- Captain Æneas Shaw: Purchased his commission towards the start of the American Revolution, later becoming Captain. Rejoined the reformed Queen's Rangers in 1792 when the unit relocated to Kingston, and then went with Lieutenant Colonel Simcoe to York, present-day Toronto, in 1793.
