= William Smallwood =

American planter, military officer and politician (1732–1792)

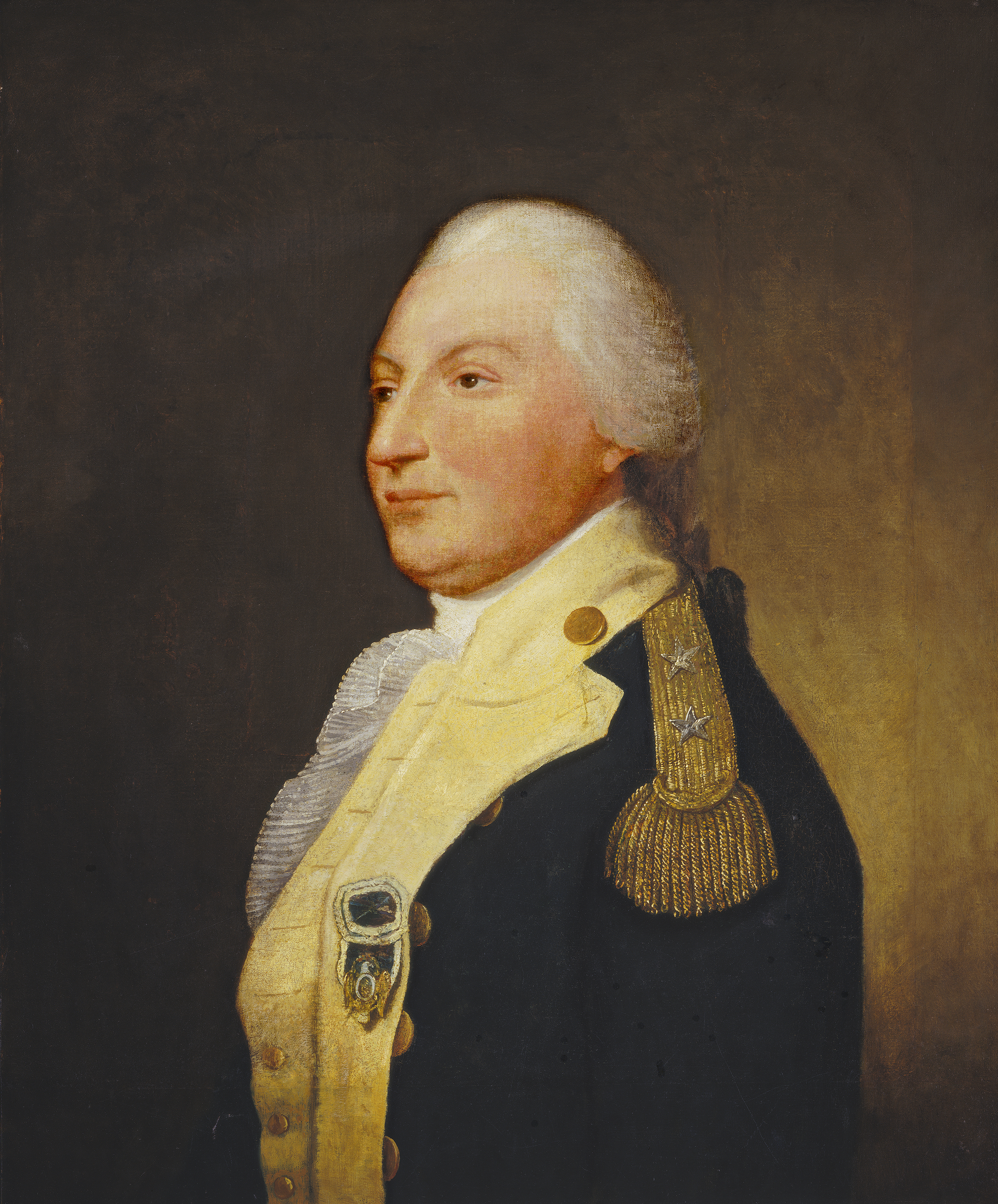
- Portrait by Robert Edge Pine, c. 1785–1788

4th Governor of Maryland
- In office November 26, 1785 – November 24, 1788
- Preceded by: William Paca
- Succeeded by: John E. Howard

Personal details
- Born: 1732 Charles County, Province of Maryland, British America
- Died: February 14, 1792 (aged 59–60) Marbury, Maryland, U.S.
- Resting place: Smallwood State Park

Military service
- Allegiance: Maryland; United States
- Branch/service: Maryland Provincial Forces; Continental Army; North Carolina Militia
- Years of service: 1754-1763 (Maryland); 1776–1783 (US)
- Rank: Lieutenant; Major general (US)
- Commands: 1st Maryland Regiment; North Carolina Militia (1780)
- Battles/wars: French and Indian War; American Revolutionary War

William Smallwood (1732 – February 14, 1792) was an American planter, military officer and politician from Charles County, Maryland. He served in the American Revolutionary War, rising to the rank of major general. He was serving as the fourth governor of Maryland when the state adopted the United States Constitution.

== Early life and education ==
Smallwood was born in 1732 to planter Bayne Smallwood (1711–1768) and Priscilla Heaberd or Heabeard (c.1715–1784). He had six siblings: Lucy Heaberd Smallwood (c. 1734-1768, married John Truman Stoddert), Elizabeth Smallwood (born c. 1736, married James Leiper), Margaret Smallwood (born c. 1738, married Walter Truman Stoddert), Heaberd Smallwood (c. 1740–1780), Eleanor Smallwood (born c. 1743 married William Grayson) and Priscilla Heaberd Smallwood (c. 1750–1815, married John Courts in 1794). His sister Eleanor and brother Heaberd served with him later in the American Revolutionary War.

His parents sent the boys to England, for their education at Eton. His great-grandfather was James Smallwood, who immigrated in 1664 and became a member of the Maryland Assembly in 1692. James' son Bayne (1685–1709) followed him later in the Assembly. Bayne (1711–1775) and his sister Hester were the great-great-grandchildren of Maryland Governor William Stone; Hester (Smallwood) Smith's daughter-in-law Sarah (Butler) Stone was the grandmother of James Butler Bonham and Milledge Luke Bonham. A first cousin of James and Milledge Bonham was Senator Matthew Butler.

Smallwood served as an officer during the French and Indian War, the North American theater of the Seven Years' War, and was elected to the pre-Revolution colonial-era provincial assembly for the Province of Maryland.

== Career ==
=== American Revolution ===
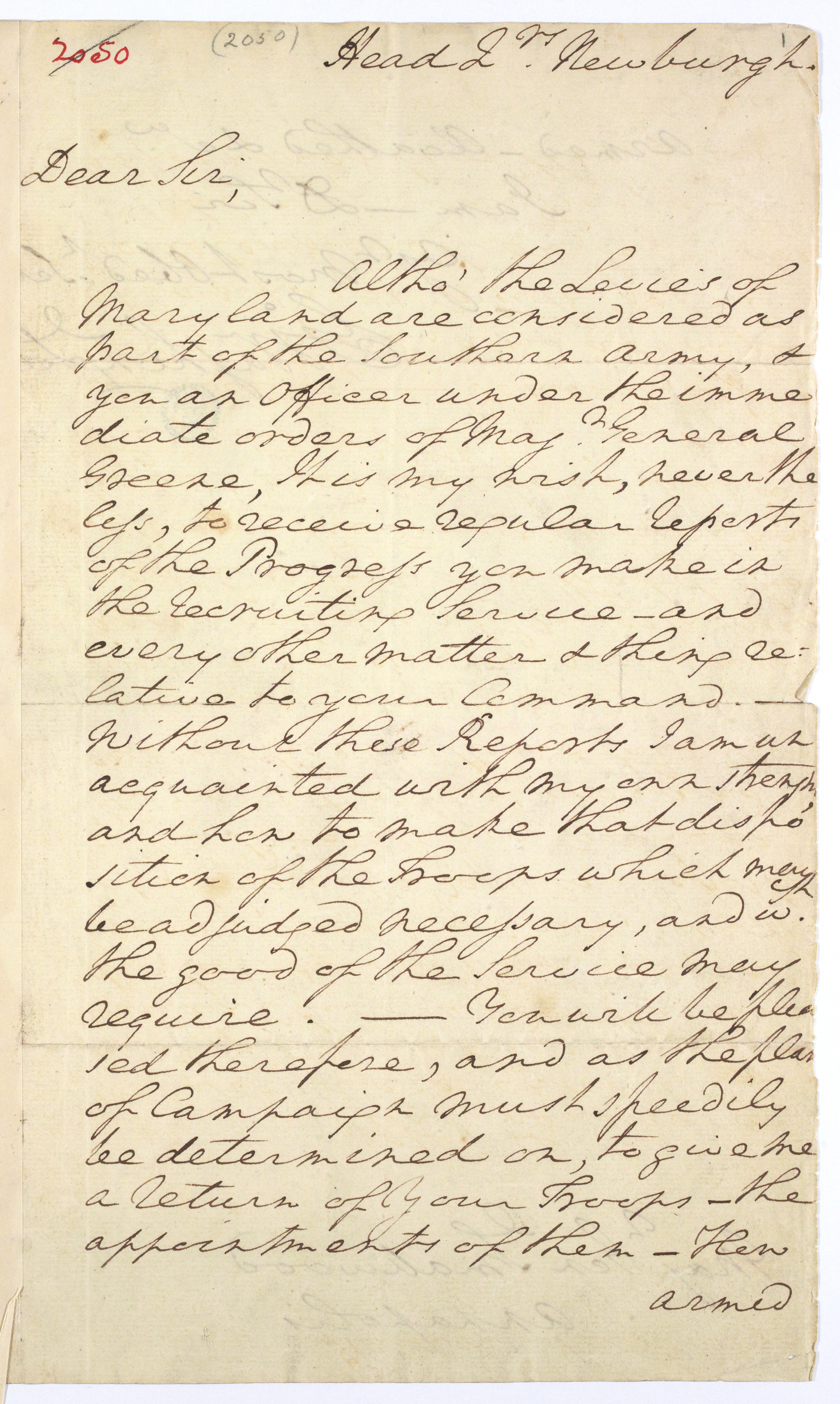
A July 1782 letter from George Washington to Smallwood asking for an update on Continental Army troop recruitment

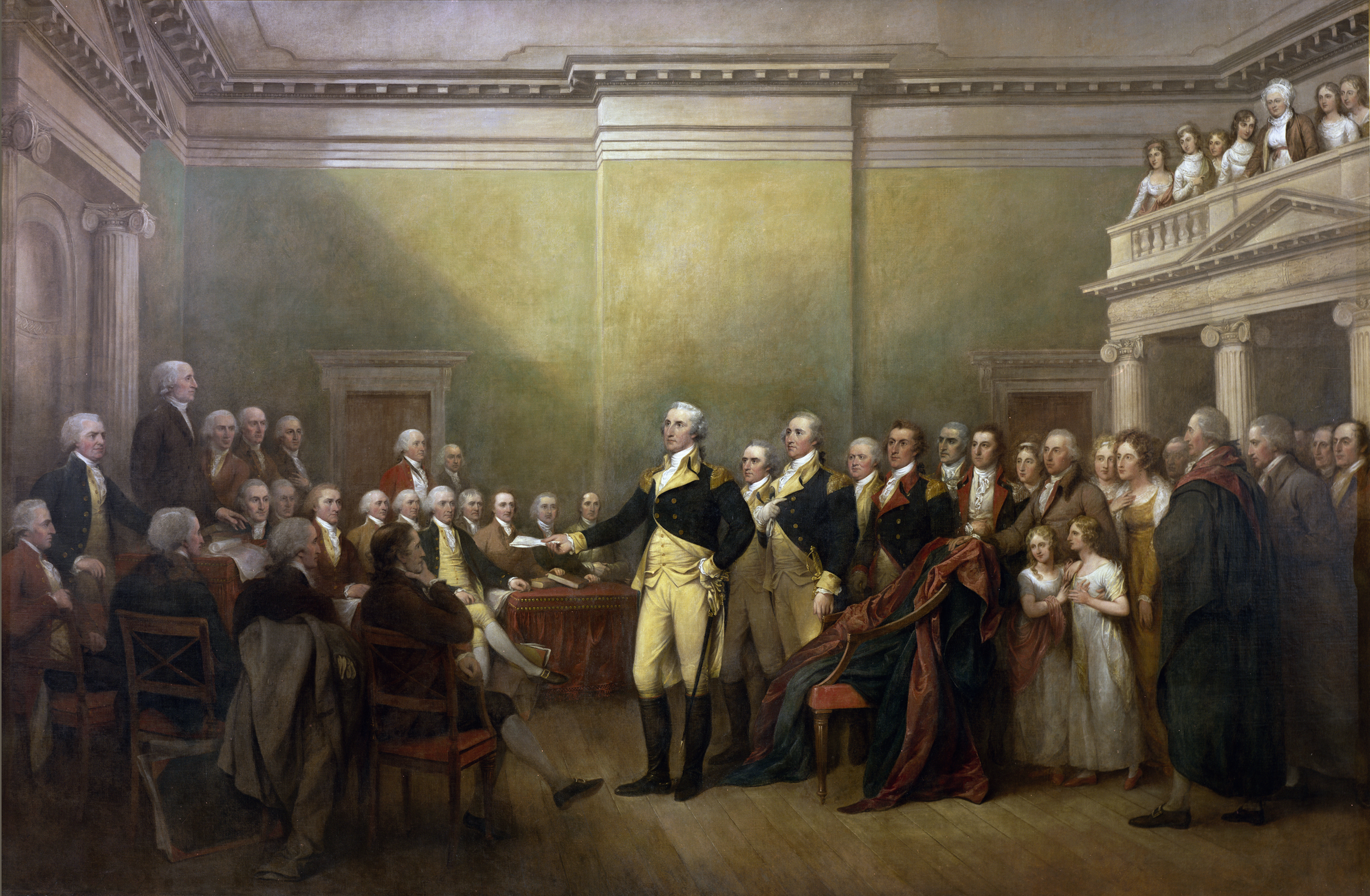
General George Washington Resigning His Commission, an 1824 portrait by John Trumbull that now is on display in the United States Capitol rotunda, depicts Smallwood (the third person behind Washington).

When the American Revolutionary War began, Smallwood was appointed a colonel of the 1st Maryland Regiment in 1776. He led the regiment in the New York and New Jersey campaign.

For their role in the Battle of Long Island on August 27, 1776, when the Maryland Regiment covered the hasty retreat of the defeated Continental Army, General George Washington promoted Smallwood to brigadier general. Washington bestowed on the regiment a future state nickname, "Old Line State", in reference to the attempt by the Maryland 400 to hold the line at the Old Stone House against a larger force of British and Hessian troops during the battle. Shortly thereafter, Smallwood led what remained of his regiment to fight "alongside soldiers from Connecticut, Delaware, and New York" in the Battle of White Plains, when he was twice wounded but "prevented the destruction of the entire Continental Army".

On December 21, 1777, Smallwood commanded 1,500 Delaware and Maryland troops at the Continental Army Encampment Site on the east side of Brandywine Creek, to prevent occupation of Wilmington by the British and to protect the flour mills on the Brandywine. He continued to serve under George Washington in the Philadelphia campaign, where his regiment again distinguished itself at Germantown. He was then quartered at Foulke House, which was occupied by the family of Sally Wister.

In 1780, he was a part of General Horatio Gates' army that was routed at Camden, South Carolina; his brigade was among the formations that held their ground, garnering Smallwood a promotion to major general. Smallwood's accounts of the battle and criticisms of Gates' behavior before and during the battle may have contributed to the Congressional inquiries into the debacle. Opposed to the hiring and promotion of foreigners, Smallwood objected to working under Baron von Steuben. Smallwood briefly commanded the militia forces of North Carolina in late 1780 and early 1781 before returning to Maryland, staying there for the remainder of the war. He resigned from the Continental Army in 1783 and later that year was elected to serve as the first president of the newly established Society of the Cincinnati of Maryland.

=== Maryland governor ===
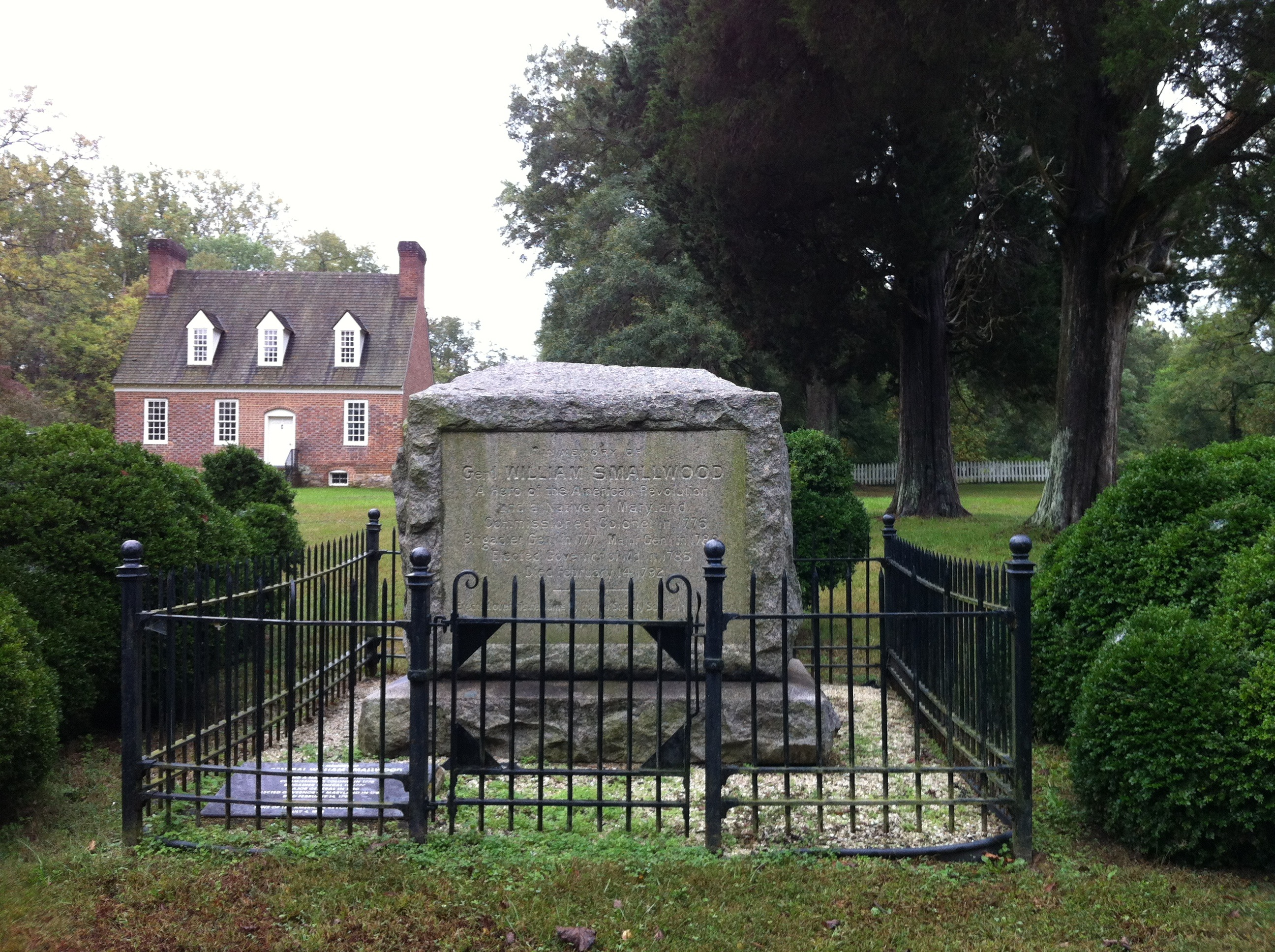
Gravestone of Smallwood at Smallwood's Retreat near Marbury, Maryland

Smallwood was elected to Congress in 1784, but before he could take his seat, the Legislature chose him to succeed William Paca as Governor of Maryland. He qualified on November 26, 1785, and served the customary three terms, retiring from his gubernatorial office on November 24, 1788. Smallwood had the misfortune of serving as governor during one of the most difficult periods in the history of the nation. Not only were the Articles of Confederation proving inoperable, but the country also found itself in the midst of an economic depression. In spite of the country's unsettled affairs, Smallwood was responsible for several major accomplishments, including convening the state's convention that ratified the United States Constitution, despite strong opposition to the proposed document in the State.

== Later years ==
Smallwood never married. The 1790 United States census reveals that he held 56 slaves and a yearly tobacco crop of 3000 pounds.

When he died in 1792, his estate, known as Mattawoman, including his home the Retreat, passed to his sister Eleanor who married Colonel William Grayson of Virginia. William Truman Stoddert, Smallwood's nephew, was orphaned at age nine and raised by his maternal grandfather, Bayne Smallwood. Stoddert also served in the Maryland Line and was admitted as an original member of the Society of the Cincinnati in Maryland.

== Legacy ==
Local historical signs in Calvert, Maryland, note that General Smallwood occupied the "East Nottingham Friends House" at the intersections of Calvert Road and Brick Meetinghouse Road (near the intersection of 272 and 273) about 6 miles east of Rison, Maryland. During his occupation of the building in 1778, Gen. Smallwood used the building as a hospital. Some of the soldiers who died in the building were buried in the graveyard directly outside. Smallwood frequented the "Cross Keys Inn" (built in 1774), at the time a several-room inn and bar. This building stands as a private residence at the intersection of Calvert Road and Cross Keys Road directly down the hill. His restored plantation home, Smallwood's Retreat, and burial site is located in Smallwood State Park in Marbury, Maryland. Smallwood Church Road leads from the State Park toward Old Durham Church, where he was a vestryman.

Several paintings exist of Smallwood. One hangs in the Old Senate Chamber in the Maryland State House in Annapolis, Maryland, and he and the State House appear in John Trumbull's 1824 painting General George Washington Resigning His Commission, which hangs in the US Capitol Rotunda and was featured on the reverse of the United States five-thousand-dollar bill.

The William Smallwood Collection is housed at the Maryland Center for History and Culture.

== Honors ==
- The Baltimore chapter of the Daughters of the American Revolution (DAR), established in 1907, is called the General William Smallwood Chapter in honor of Smallwood.
- General Smallwood Middle School in Indian Head, Maryland was named for him. The school was renamed Glymont Middle School effective July 1, 2025.
- In Anne Arundel County, Maryland, a coastal fortification developed in the late 1890s was named Fort Smallwood in his honor and the location is now known as Fort Smallwood Park. The road running from Fort Smallwood Park through Pasadena, Maryland and into Baltimore is named Fort Smallwood Road.

Political offices
Preceded by William Paca	Governor of Maryland; 1785 –1788	Succeeded by John E. Howard
Preceded by George Plater	President of the Maryland State Senate; 1791	Succeeded by George Dent
