= Lookout Place =

Coordinates: 40.58061°N 74.14599°W

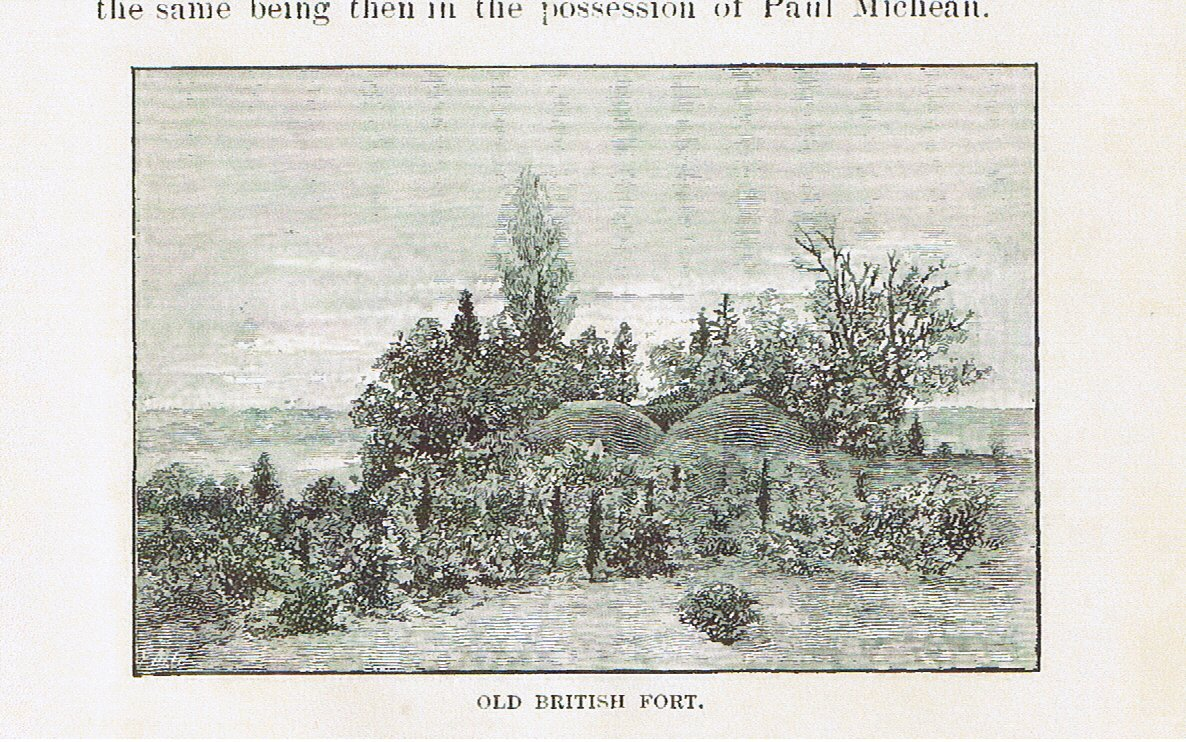
Lookout Place or Fort Hill atop LaTourette Hill in late nineteenth century

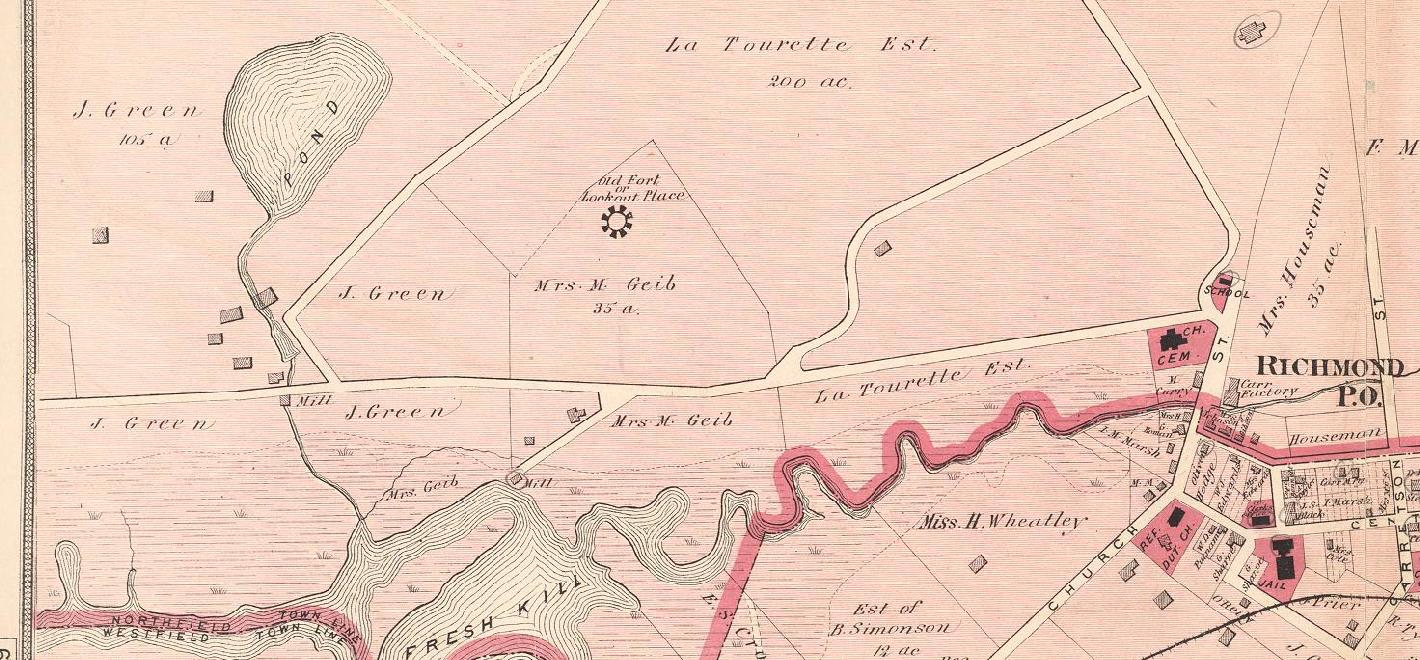
Map dated 1874 showing Lookout Place above Fresh Kills Creek

Lookout Place or Fort Hill (also known as Fort Izard) was an American Revolutionary War British garrison, or earthen mound-fortress roughly 44 feet square at the top of La Tourette Hill in Historic Richmondtown, Staten Island, New York. The redoubt was constructed in 1776 by British Regulars during the occupation of Richmond County. General William Howe planned his successful capture of New York City while encamped on the Island, along with 30,000 British and Hessian soldiers joining to suppress the rebellion after the arrival of his brother Admiral Richard Howe. The fort overlooked a fresh water spring about 200 feet directly below (known as the Lord Howe Spring), the Old Mill Road, Fresh Kills which is a tributary of Richmond Creek, St. Andrews Church and the town of Richmond, then referred to as Cuckoldstown, in the valley just below La Tourette Hill.

The hilltop was widely denuded of trees by the British during the war, allowing the soldiers to have unobstructed views of Lower New York Bay and the Arthur Kill. It is now the La Tourette Golf Course.

Extensive archeological digs have taken place at the beginning of the 20th century, revealing all manner of British accuetrament, from remnants of weaponry to soldier coat buttons, shoe buckles and pottery fragments.

Robert Rogers created a new unit while encamped at Richmondtown called The Queen's Rangers named after Charlotte, wife of King George III.
