= John Wemyss =

John Wemyss may refer to:

- John Wemyss (minister) (c. 1579–1636), Church of Scotland minister, Hebrew scholar and exegete
- Sir John Wemyss (landowner) (1558–1621), Scottish landowner
- John Wemyss, 1st Earl of Wemyss (1586–1649), his son, Scottish politician
- John Wemyss of Logie (1569–1596), Scottish courtier and spy
