= Weems =

Weems may refer to:

People:

- Anna Maria Weems (c. 1840–after 1863), born a slave in Maryland, escaped to British North America disguised as a coachman
- Avery Weems (born 1997), American baseball player
- Capell Lane Weems (1860-1913), Republican Congressman from Ohio
- Carrie Mae Weems (born 1953), American photographer
- Clarence N. Weems Jr. (born 1907), American scholar and military officer
- Debbie Weems (1951-1978), American actress
- Donald Weems, birth name of Kuwasi Balagoon (1946-1986), American Black Panther, member of the Black Liberation Army, and New Afrikan anarchist
- Eric Weems (born 1985), American National Football League player
- John Crompton Weems (1778-1862), American politician
- Jordan Weems (born 1992), American baseball player
- Katherine Lane Weems (1899-1989), American sculptor
- Kimberly Weems, American statistician
- Mason Locke Weems, generally known as Parson Weems (1759-1825), American book agent and author
- P. V. H. Weems (1889-1979), inventor of air navigation and related instruments
- Priscilla Weems (born 1972), American actress
- Sonny Weems (born 1986), American National Basketball Association player; now player for Maccabi Tel Aviv of the Israeli Premier League and the Euroleague
- Ted Weems (1901-1963), American bandleader and musician

Places:

- Mount Weems, Antarctica, named for P. V. H. Weems
- Weems, Ohio, an unincorporated community
- Weems, Virginia, an unincorporated community

Fictional characters:

- Burt Weems, a character in the American sitcom television series The Hogan Family
- Duquan "Dukie" Weems, in the television drama The Wire
- Corporal Wallace A. Weems, codenamed Rip Cord (G.I. Joe)
- Stephen Weems, also known as Modular Man, a Marvel Comics villain
- "Ace" Weems, in the television comedy Get Smart episode The Mess of Adrian Listenger
- Larissa Weems, a character in the Netflix series Wednesday

Other uses:

- a dugout, called a Weems in ancient Scotland
- Weems House, a historic residence in Mobile, Alabama

== See also ==
- Wemyss (disambiguation)
