= Continental Army Encampment Site =

- U.S. National Register of Historic Places
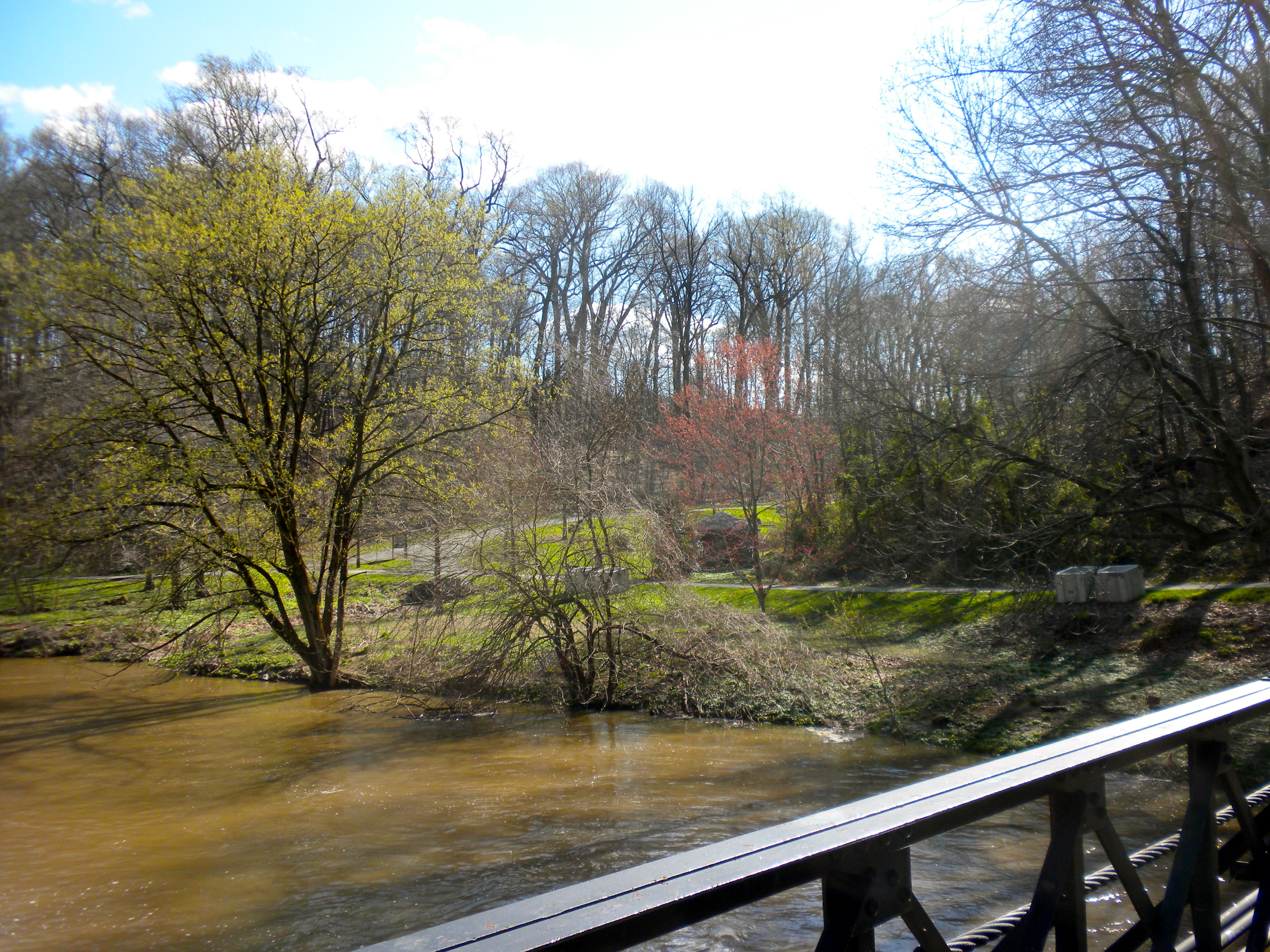
- Continental Army Encampment Site, March 2010

- Location within Delaware Location within the United States
- Location: Lovering Ave. near Broom St., Wilmington, Delaware
- Coordinates: 39°45′28″N 75°33′22″W
- Area: 8 acres (3.2 ha)
- Built: 1777
- NRHP reference No.: 73000547
- Added to NRHP: December 18, 1973

Continental Army Encampment Site is a historic site located at Wilmington, New Castle County, Delaware. The Continental Army troops camped on the east side of Brandywine Creek, which is now a part of Brandywine Park. An early mill race is still visible, on the site, a reminder of the extensive early milling industry on the Brandywine. The Continental Army camped at the site for a few days before the Battle of Brandywine in August 1777. On December 21, 1777, 1,500 Delaware and Maryland troops under the command of General William Smallwood returned to the campsite. These troops were stationed to prevent occupation of Wilmington by the British and to protect the flour mills on the Brandywine.

It was added to the National Register of Historic Places in 1973.

== See also ==
- American Revolutionary War
- List of American Revolutionary War battles
