= Smallwood State Park =

Maryland state historical park

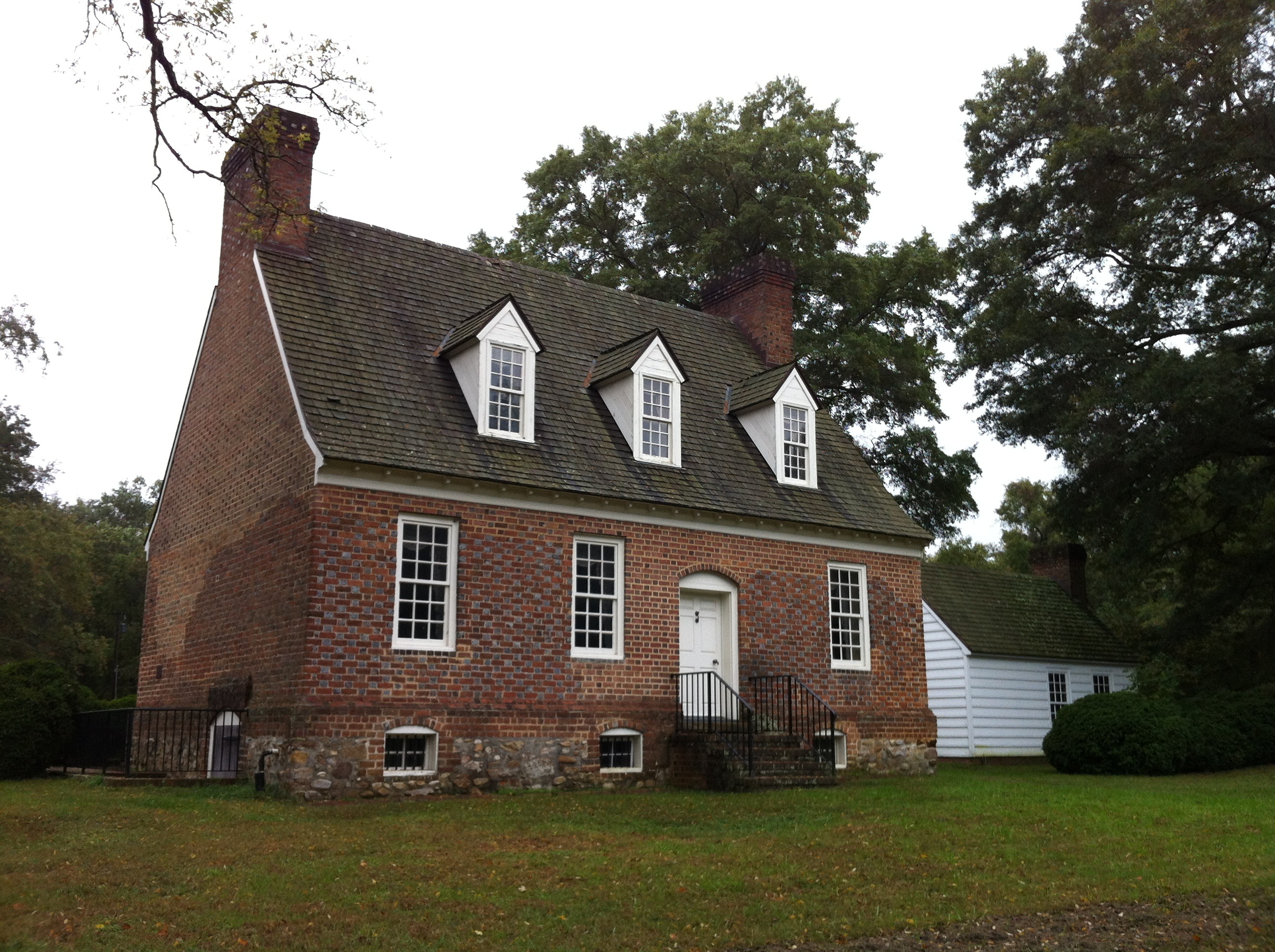
- Smallwood's Retreat

- Location within Maryland
- Location: Charles County, Maryland, United States
- Nearest town: Marbury, Maryland
- Coordinates: 38°33′23″N 77°11′07″W
- Area: 984 acres (398 ha)
- Elevation: 3 ft (0.91 m)
- Established: 1957
- Administrator: Maryland Department of Natural Resources
- Designation: Maryland state park
- Website: Official website

Smallwood State Park is a Maryland state park located on Mattawoman Creek near Marbury, Charles County, Maryland. The park preserves Smallwood's Retreat, the plantation home of former Continental Army officer and governor of Maryland, Major General William Smallwood. The park's 984 acres (398 ha) include a marina, boat ramps, picnicking facilities, campsites, cabins, trails, and nature center.

== History ==
After a succession of occupants left Smallwood's Retreat a "standing ruin", a group of local citizens organized the Smallwood Foundation to restore the historic house. The house and ten surrounding acres were acquired in 1938. In 1957, the state began property acquisition for Smallwood State Park, purchasing 323 farmland acres from three owners. The park saw its formal dedication in 1958, when the Smallwood Foundation transferred the ten acres containing the restored Smallwood's Retreat to the state.

== Gallery ==
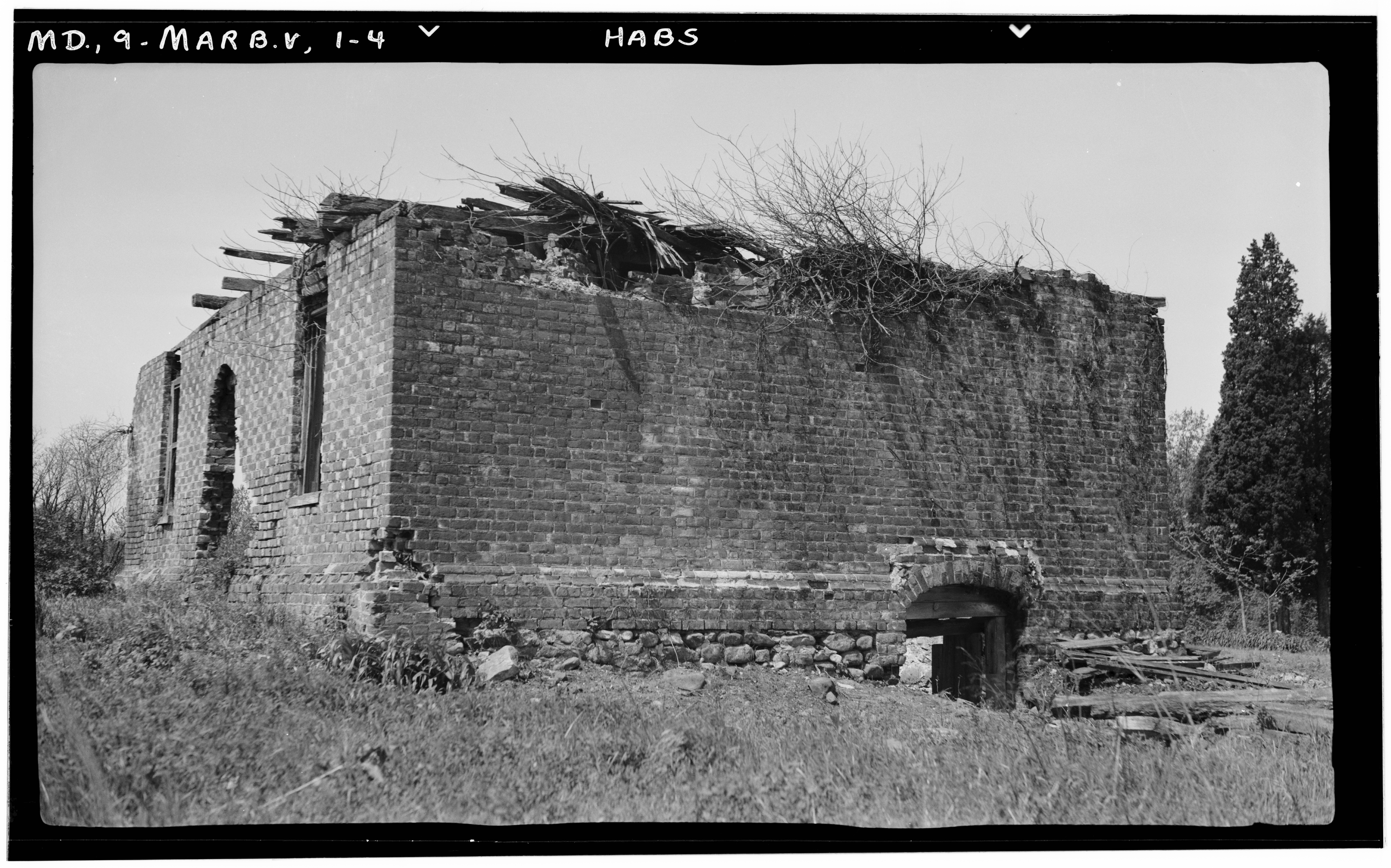
Pre-restoration ruins

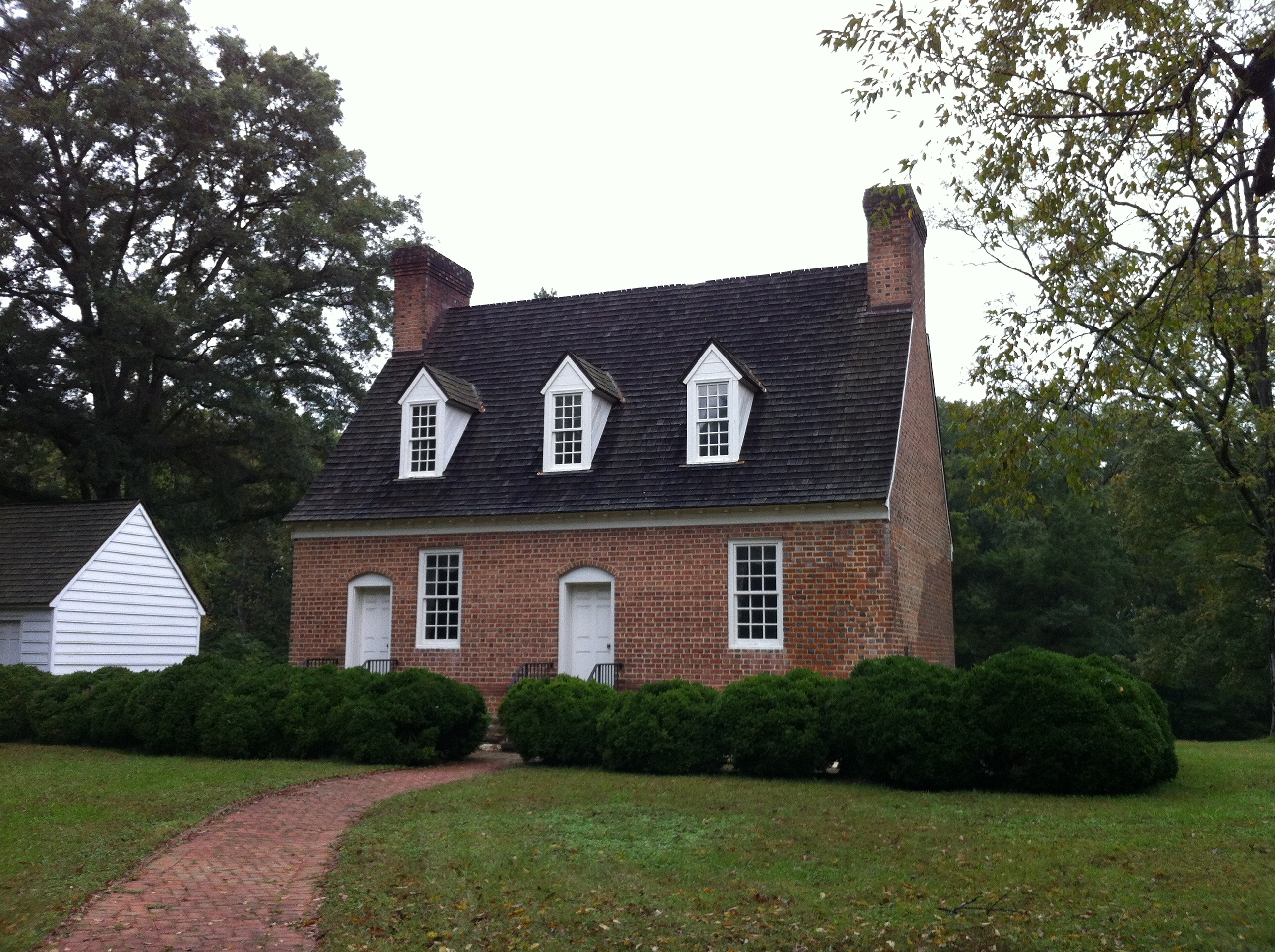
Southeast facade

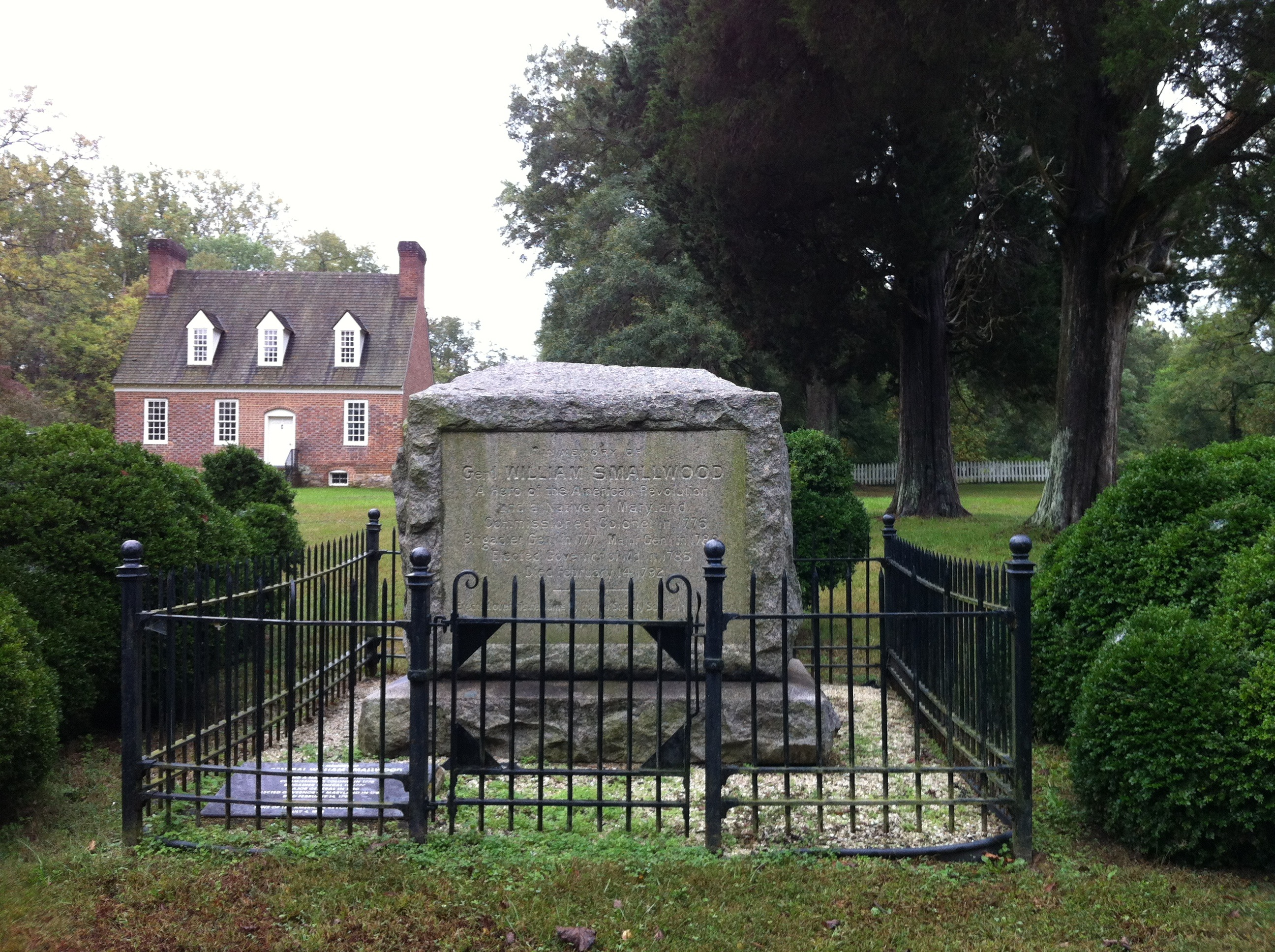
Gen. Smallwood grave
