= Brandywine flag =

Banner carried into a 1777 battle in the American Revolution

Brandywine Flag

The Brandywine flag was a banner carried by Captain Robert Wilson's company of the 7th Pennsylvania Regiment. The company flag received the name after it was used in the Battle of Brandywine, September 11, 1777. The flag is red, with a red and white American flag image in the canton.

Other stories indicate that the flag may have actually flown earlier, at the Battle of Cooch's Bridge in Delaware on 3 September 1777. Captain Wilson may have also brought it to the Battle of Paoli on 21 September and the Battle of Germantown on 4 October.

The 7th Pennsylvania Flag may have been one of the first American flags to feature stars and stripes, although it was a militia company's flag, not a flag of Washington's army. The Flag Resolution of 1777 defined the official flag of the United States as having 13 stripes and 13 stars, although the specific pattern of the stars was not specified. Many variations existed. The flag shown in the canton of the Brandywine Flag uses a 4-5-4 star pattern, and was probably patterned after a Hopkinson-style United States flag.

The Brandywine Flag is currently displayed in Philadelphia's Independence National Historical Park, and was featured on a 33¢ postage stamp issued in 2000, as a part of the US Postal Service's Stars and Stripes series.

== Similar flag ==
Forster flag (obverse)

Forster flag (reverse)

The Forster flag is a very similar flag that was used around the same time during the American Revolutionary War.

== See also ==
- List of flags of the United States
