= John Wemyss (minister) =

- Church: Church of Scotland

Personal details
- Born: 1579
- Died: 1636 (aged 56–57)

John Wemyss (c. 1579–1636), also spelled Weemes or Weemse, was a Church of Scotland minister, Hebrew scholar and exegete.

== Life ==
John Wemyss was born at Lathocker in eastern Fife, and educated at the University of St Andrews. In 1608, he was appointed minister of Hutton in Berwickshire, and in 1613 he was translated to Duns. For several years Wemyss acted as a representative of Presbyterian ministers in altercations with champions of episcopacy, for example at the Falkland Conference (4 May 1609) and the Perth Assembly of 1618 which issued the Five Articles. After appearing before the Court of High Commission in 1620 for disobeying the Articles, he apparently gave up ecclesiastical affairs and devoted himself to study and writing.

In his writings Wemyss gave prominence to Hebrew and to Jewish writings, from the Midrash through the medievals to the early moderns, which made him one of the pioneers in Scotland of the study of Jewish life and learning. John Wemyss is seen as one of the first Christian writers who presented a positive argument in favor of Jews being allowed to settle in a Christian country. His writings provided a positive view in favor of the resettlement of the Jews in England. In addition to readmission, Wemyss believed in the conversion of the Jews. He rooted his beliefs in the Biblical injunction regarding the treatment of strangers. Although his attitude to the Jews included both negative and positive views, he did express a hesitancy about persecuting them; this marked the start of the move to enlightenment tolerance.

Over the years his commitment to Presbyterianism also gave way to Episcopalian sympathies. King Charles I appointed him a prebendary of Durham in England on 7 June 1634.

== Bibliography ==
- The Christian Synagogue, wherein is contained the diverse reading, the right poynting, translation and collation of Scripture with Scripture (1623, 1630, 1633, 1636)
- Exercitations Divine. Containing diverse Questions and Solutions for the right understanding of the Scriptures. Proving the necessitie, Majestie, integrity, perspicuity, and sense thereof (1632, 1634)
- An exposition of the ceremonial lavves of Moses, as they are annexed to the Tenne Commandements (1636)
- An exposition of the iudiciall lawes of Moses (1636)
- An exposition of the lawes of Moses (1632, 1633)
- An exposition of the morall lavv, or, The Ten commandements of Almightie God set dovvne by vvay of exercitations (1632)
- Observations, Naturall and Morall. With a short Treatise of the Numbers, Weights, and Measures, used by the Hebrews; with the valuation of them according to the Measures of the Greeks and Romans. For the clearing of sundry places of Scripture in which these weights and measures are set downe by way of Allusion (1633, 1636)
- The Portraiture of the Image of God in Man. In his three estates, of Creation, Restauration, Glorification. Digested into two parts. The first containing, the Image of God both in the Body and Soule of Man, and Immortality of both…The second containing, the passions of man in the concupiscible and irascible part of the soule…All set downe by way of collation, and cleared by sundry distinctions, both out of the Schoolemen, and moderne Writers (1627, 1632, 1636)
- A treatise of the fovre degenerate sonnes (1636)
- The workes of Mr. Iohn Weemse, of Lathocker in Scotland (1633, 1636, 1637)

== Sources ==
- John Weemes (ODNB)
- John Weemes (Open Library)
- John Weemes (Bibliography)
- Shim, Jai-Sung. Biblical Hermeneutics and Hebraism in the Early Seventeenth Century as Reflected in the Work of John Weemse (1579-1636). PhD diss., Calvin Theological Seminary, 1998.
- Carlyle, E. Irving. "John Wemyss". In Dictionary of National Biography, ed. Sidney Lee, 60:249-250. London: Smith, Elder, & Co., 1899.
