= Battle of Fishdam Ford =

1780 Battle of the American Revolutionary War

- Part of the American Revolutionary War
Date	November 9, 1780
Location	Chester County, near present-day Carlisle, South Carolina 34°35′42.23″N 81°25′10.69″W
Result	Patriot victory

Belligerents
United States	Great Britain

Commanders and leaders
(United States) Thomas Sumter	(Kingdom of Great Britain) James Wemyss (surrendered) (WIA)

Strength
525 militia	210 regulars 40 militia dragoons

Casualties and losses
Unknown	20 killed or wounded

The Battle of Fishdam Ford was an attempted surprise attack by British forces under the command of Major James Wemyss against an encampment of Patriot militia under the command of local Brigadier General Thomas Sumter around 1 am on the morning of November 9, 1780, late in the American Revolutionary War. Wemyss was wounded and captured in the attack, which failed because of heightened security in Sumter's camp and because Wemyss did not wait until dawn to begin the attack.

== Background ==
Pursuant to the British "southern strategy" for winning the American Revolutionary War, British forces had captured Charleston, South Carolina early in 1780, and had driven Continental Army forces from South Carolina. Following his successful routing of a second Continental Army at Camden in August 1780, British General Lord Cornwallis paused with his army in the Waxhaws region of northern South Carolina. Believing British and Loyalist forces to be in control of Georgia and South Carolina, he decided to turn north and address the threat posed by the Continental Army remnants in North Carolina. In mid-September he moved north to Charlotte, North Carolina, where he was virtually surrounded by active North Carolina militia and Continental Army units. Following the important defeat of gathering Loyalists at Kings Mountain, Cornwallis retreated back to Winnsboro, South Carolina, where he engaged in attempts to suppress the Patriot militia that were harassing his supply and communication lines.

Two troublesome militia commanders in South Carolina were Thomas Sumter and Francis Marion. Marion caused trouble for Cornwallis in the northeastern part of the state, east of the Santee River. His activities were successful enough that Cornwallis sent Lieutenant Colonel Banastre Tarleton in November to hunt the wily Marion down. Sumter made similar troubles in the backcountry, where Cornwallis sent Major James Wemyss with the 63rd Regiment and some Loyalist dragoons to find him.

Wemyss learned on November 8 from local Loyalists that Sumter was encamped near Fishdam Ford. His intelligence about Sumter's camp was sufficiently detailed that some men were specifically designated to attack Sumter's tent. Moving quickly, Wemyss arrived near Sumter's camp early on November 9. Fearing they would be discovered by Sumter's patrols, Wemyss opted to attack immediately rather than waiting for dawn.

== Battle ==
Sumter's men had been wary to the possibility of surprise attacks, which were a popular British tactic. His officers had ordered their men to lie on their arms, to keep their fires burning, and had specific instructions about how to form up in case of attack. When Wemyss led the British attack against Sumter's sentries, he was hit twice by musket fire and went down. His dragoons continued the charge into the camp, where the campfires illuminated them, providing easy targets for Sumter's men, who had lined up in the woods just outside the camp. Their first volley took the British lead company by surprise, killing and wounding several men. They retreated, and Wemyss infantry then advanced into the camp, where they also came under fire from the woods. The British attempted a bayonet charge, but it was confounded by a fence between the two lines in the darkness. After twenty minutes of battle, the British retreated, leaving their wounded, including Major Wemyss, on the field; the patriots won.

Sumter played virtually no role in the battle, escaping from his tent to the riverbank early in the action.

== Aftermath ==
Following the British failure, Lord Cornwallis recalled Tarleton to instead go after Sumter, who he believed was preparing an attack on Ninety Six. Tarleton and Sumter met at Blackstock's Farm, in which Sumter very nearly revenged himself for Tarleton's near-capture of him at Fishing Creek in August.
