= James Wemyss (British Army officer) =

British Officer during the American Revolution

- Wemyss Family Coat of Arms
- Born: 7 November 1748; Edinburgh, Scotland, Kingdom of Great Britain
- Died: 16 December 1833 (aged 85); Huntington, New York, United States
- Spouse(s): Rachel Wemyss ? Wemysss
- Children: at least 1
- Military career
- Allegiance: British Empire
- Branch: British Army
- Service years: 1766–1789
- Rank: Major; Lieutenant Colonel
- Commands: Queen's Rangers; 63rd Regiment of Foot
- Conflicts: American Revolutionary War; Siege of Boston; Battle of Long Island; Battle of Ridgefield (WIA); Battle of Short Hills; Battle of Brandywine (WIA); Siege of Charleston; Battle of Fishdam Ford (WIA) (surrendered)

Lieutenant Colonel James Wemyss was a British Army officer who served during the American Revolutionary War, best known for his command of the Queen's Rangers and the 63rd Regiment of Foot. He was known for his brutality and aggression in warfare, often being compared to Banastre Tarleton. He was wounded and captured at the Battle of Fishdam Ford in 1780.

== Life & Military Service ==
James Wemyss was born in 1748 to James Wemyss and Elizabeth Wylie. He was baptized on 19 July 1749, in Fife, Scotland. He was commissioned as an ensign in the 40th Regiment of Foot in 1766. He purchased a lieutenancy in 1767, and a captaincy in 1771, commanding a company of grenadiers. The 40th Regiment of Foot arrived in Boston, Massachusetts in 1775, during the Siege of Boston. Wemyss commanded a battalion of grenadiers, and prepared to attack Dorchester Heights but never did.

In 1776. he served as an aide-de-camp to General James Robertson and was present at the Battle of Long Island. In 1777, he served under William Tryon during the Battle of Ridgefield and was slightly wounded. He later took command of the Queen's Rangers and took the provincial rank of major. He led the corps at the Battle of Brandywine, where we was wounded once again. Shortly after this he resigned command, because he was not promoted, and was replaced by John Simcoe. In August 1778, Wemyss became a major in the 63rd Regiment of Foot, and was around the area of Stony Point, New York.

Wemyss was sent to South Carolina, being present during the Siege of Charleston in 1780. After the cities fall, he was sent to Georgetown, South Carolina where his job was to reinstall British authority. During 1780, he conducted operation along the Pee Dee River, where he carried out expeditions against Francis Marion. In November 1780, he attempted to ambush an American force led my Thomas Sumter at the Battle of Fishdam Ford. He was too aggressive in his approach and attacked at 1 o'clock in the morning, not waiting till morning to attack. Not being able to see well, his men walked right into the raised defenses of the patriot force, who had been told by coincidence to be up and at guard that night. Wemyss was wounded and captured during this battle, with his wounds were severe enough to end his field service during the war.

After recovering he held administrative roles, carrying dispatches and was appointed Deputy Adjutant General in the southern theater. He also negotiated prisoner exchanges in South Carolina during the British evacuation in 1783.

=== Brutality during the War ===
In 1780 during his campaign with Charles Cornwallis, Wemyss reported himself that he had burned 50 houses and plantations. He also executed deserters and militia defectors, and regularly destroyed property suspected of use by patriot rebels. In one instance, a patriot rebel named Adam Cusack was executed under Wemyss's orders. This earned him a reputation as a ruthless and rigid officer, 2nd only to Banastre Tarleton. Wemyss is also known to have burned a church in Indiantown, South Carolina, being noted as especially harsh by Banastre Tarleton. He is also associated with Christian Huck.

== Later life & Legacy ==
Wemyss returned to Scotland after the American Revolution ended but fell apon financial troubles, forcing him to move to Long Island in the United States, where the cost of living was cheaper. He was asked to serve in the American military during the War of 1812 but declined. He faced poor health in his later years, made worse by his wounds and the several bullets he took during the Battle of Fishdam Ford. He published a document strongly criticizing General William Howe's conduct of the 1775 campaign in New York and alleging widespread fraud and corruption among British quartermasters. He petitioned to the British Government in the early 1800s for a pension to help him in his old age and he was granted one. He died in 1833, being buried in the local Presbyterian Cemetery. In his life he had two wives, only one of their names surviving, and at least one son.
