= Battle of Monmouth order of battle =

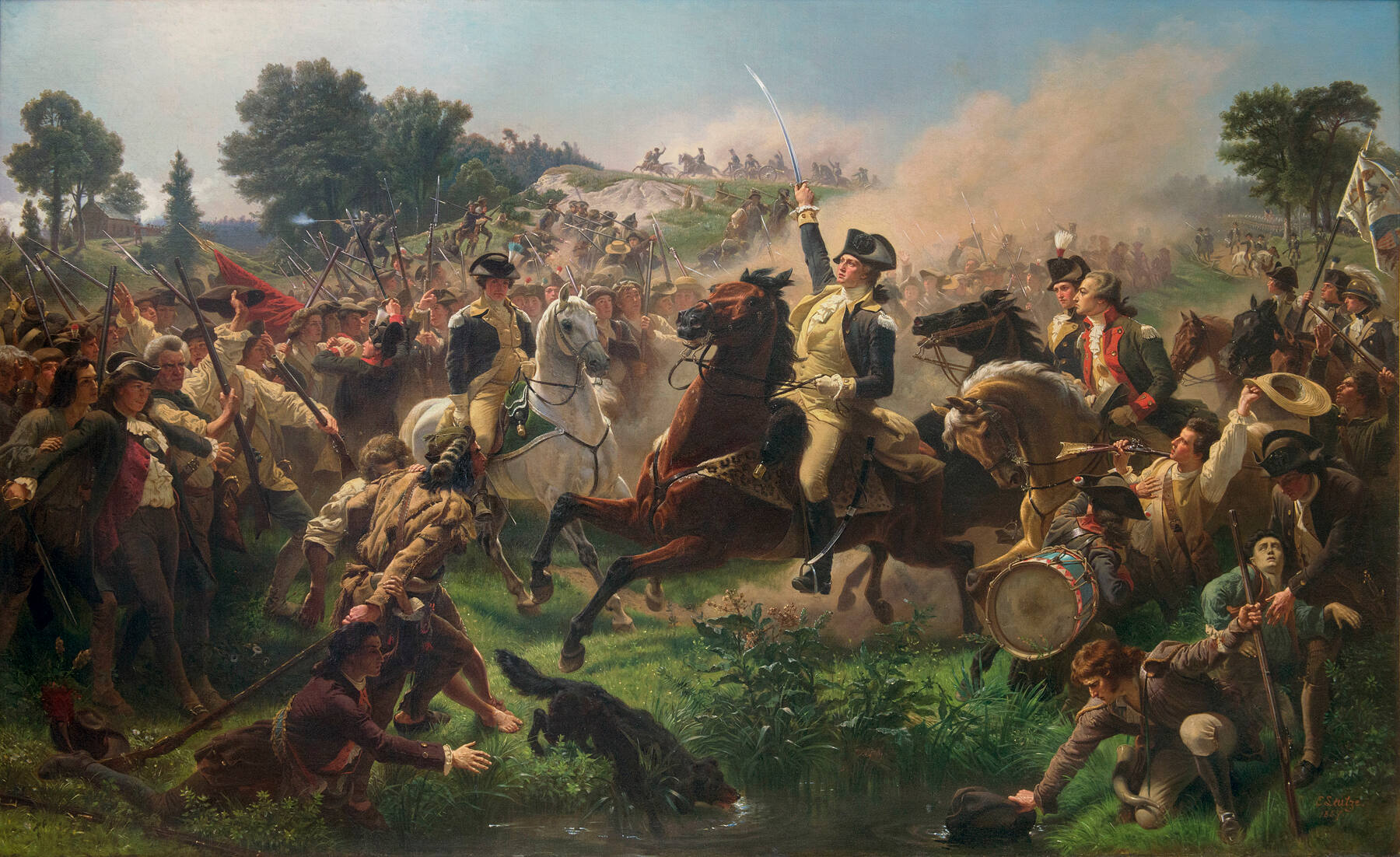
Battle of Monmouth painting shows George Washington rallying his men while an embarrassed Charles Lee waits nearby.

The Battle of Monmouth on June 28, 1778, saw a colonial American army under Major General George Washington fight a British army led by Lieutenant General Sir Henry Clinton. After evacuating Philadelphia, Pennsylvania, on June 18, Clinton intended to march his 13,000-man army to New York City. Washington sent 6,400 troops commanded by Major General Charles Lee to attack the British column of march near Monmouth Court House, New Jersey. When Clinton counterattacked, Lee ordered his badly deployed troops to fall back immediately. Washington brought up 7,000 men to support Lee's withdrawing wing and held his ground against repeated British assaults. That evening Clinton retreated from the field and continued his march to Sandy Hook, where the British fleet waited to ferry his army to New York. Both armies' casualties were about even in the last major battle in the northern colonies. Lee was court martialed for his behavior during the battle.

== British order of battle ==
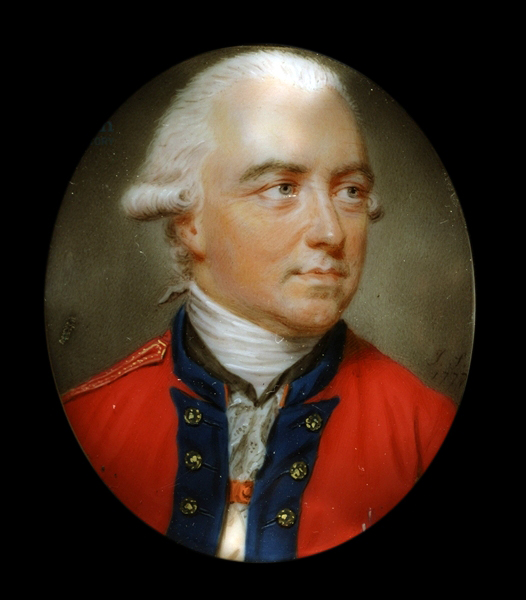
Sir Henry Clinton

Lieutenant General Sir Henry Clinton (est. 18,000–19,000)

- Staff:
  - Adjutant General: Lieutenant Colonel Francis Lord Rawdon
  - Deputy Adjutant General: Major Stephen Kemble, Captain George Hutchinson
  - Assistant Adjutant General: Lieutenant James Cramond
  - Quartermaster General: Brigadier General Sir William Erskine
  - Royal Artillery Commander: Brigadier General James Pattison
  - Senior Engineer Officer: Captain John Montresor (absent)
  - Aide-de-Camp: Major Duncan Drummond, Captains William Sutherland, Lord William Cathcart, William Crosbie, Alexander von Wilmowsky, Ernst von Munchhausen
  - Military Secretary: Captain John Smith
  - Deputy Inspector General of Provincial Forces: Captain Henry Rooke
  - Deputy Muster-Master of Provincial Forces: Andrew Bell

=== 1st Division ===
The 1st Division was commanded by Lieutenant General Lord Cornwallis and comprised 9,440 combat troops.

Unit	Commander	Strength	Notes
Rearguard	Brigadier General Sir William Erskine (Afternoon only)		
Queen's American Rangers	Lieutenant Colonel John Graves Simcoe	454	British foot regiments each contained a company of light infantry, but during the American Revolutionary War these were detached to form the separate Light Infantry Battalion.
16th Queen's Light Dragoons	Lieutenant Colonel William Harcourt	365	British foot regiments each contained a company of light infantry, but during the American Revolutionary War these were detached to form the separate Light Infantry Battalion.
1st Battalion Light Infantry	Lieutenant Colonel Robert Abercromby	730	British foot regiments each contained a company of light infantry, but during the American Revolutionary War these were detached to form the separate Light Infantry Battalion.
Grenadiers
1st Battalion	Lieutenant Colonel William Meadows	761	British foot regiments each contained a company of Grenadiers, but during the American Revolutionary War these were detached to form separate Grenadier battalions.
2nd Battalion	Lieutenant Colonel Henry Monckton	737	British foot regiments each contained a company of Grenadiers, but during the American Revolutionary War these were detached to form separate Grenadier battalions.
Guards	Brigadier General Edward Mathew		
1st Battalion	Colonel Henry Trelawny	502	The Guards battalions were formed for service in North America by drawing fifteen men from each of the sixty-four Guards companies of the Foot Guard regiments.
2nd Battalion	Lieutenant Colonel Thomas Howard	480	The Guards battalions were formed for service in North America by drawing fifteen men from each of the sixty-four Guards companies of the Foot Guard regiments.
3rd Brigade	Major General Charles Grey		
15th Regiment of Foot	Lieutenant Colonel Joseph Stopford(?)	352	
17th Regiment of Foot	Lieutenant Colonel Charles Mawhood	330	
42nd (Royal Highland) Regiment of Foot	Lieutenant Colonel Thomas Stirling	639	
44th Regiment of Foot	Lieutenant Colonel Henry Hope	334	
4th Brigade	Major General Charles Grey		
33rd Regiment of Foot	Lieutenant Colonel James Webster	365	
37th Regiment of Foot	Major James Cousseau	386	
46th Regiment of Foot	Lieutenant Colonel Enoch Markham	319	
64th Regiment of Foot	Major Robert McLeroth	426	
5th Brigade	Brigadier General Alexander Leslie		
7th Regiment of Foot (Royal Fusiliers)	Lieutenant Colonel Alured Clarke	333	
26th Regiment of Foot	Lieutenant Colonel Charles Stuart	314	
63rd Regiment of Foot	Colonel James Paterson(?)	305	
Hessian Grenadiers	Colonel Heinrich Julius von Kospoth		
Linsing	Lieutenant Colonel Otto Christian von Linsingen	411	
Minnigerode	Lieutenant Colonel Friedrich L. von Minnigerode	427	
Lengerke	Lieutenant Colonel Georg Emanuel Lengerke	453	
Noncombatants
Women		355	Number of women granted permission to accompany the army. Because many women who were supposed to have been transported from Philadelphia by sea chose to accompany the army overland, the actual number was greater.

=== 2nd Division ===
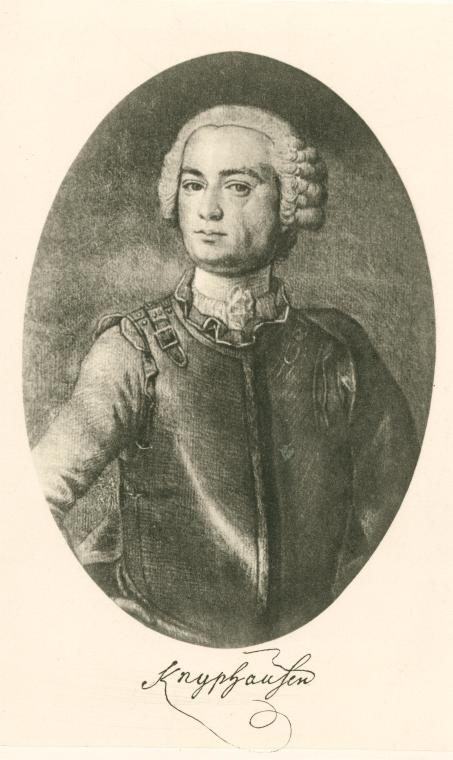
Wilhelm von Knyphausen

The 2nd Division was commanded by Lieutenant General Wilhelm von Knyphausen and comprised 8,229 combat troops and 1,394 noncombatants. While the 1st Division fought at Monmouth Court House, the 2nd Division proceeded with the 1,500 wagons of the baggage train towards Middletown. It endured only light harassment from American militia along the way.

Unit	Commander	Strength	Notes
17th Light Dragoons	Lieutenant Colonel Samuel Birch	333	British foot regiments each contained a company of light infantry, but during the American Revolutionary War these were detached to form the separate Light Infantry Battalion.
2nd Battalion Light Infantry	Lieutenant Colonel John Maitland	799	British foot regiments each contained a company of light infantry, but during the American Revolutionary War these were detached to form the separate Light Infantry Battalion.
Jäger Korps	Lieutenant Colonel Ludwig von Wurmb		
Hessian Jägers		701	Of the Hessian Jägers, 37 were mounted and 664 were infantry.
Anspach Chasseurs		92	Of the Hessian Jägers, 37 were mounted and 664 were infantry.
1st Brigade	Major General James Grant		
4th (King's Own) Regiment of Foot	Lieutenant Colonel James Ogilvie	321	
23rd Regiment of Foot (Royal Welsh Fusiliers):	Lieutenant Colonel Nesbitt Balfour	432	
28th Regiment of Foot:	Lieutenant Colonel Robert Prescott	313	
49th Regiment of Foot:	Lieutenant Colonel Sir Henry Calder	372	
2nd Brigade	Major General James Grant		
5th Regiment of Foot	Major George Harris(?)	367	
10th Regiment of Foot	Lieutenant Colonel Francis Smith	135	
27th (Inniskilling) Regiment of Foot	Lieutenant Colonel Edward Mitchell	340	
40th Regiment of Foot	Lieutenant Colonel Sir Thomas Musgrave	322	
55th Regiment of Foot	Lieutenant Colonel Cornelius Cuyler	268	
Stirn's Brigade	Major General Johann Daniel Stirn		
Leib Infantry Regiment	Colonel Friedrich W. von Wurmb	573	
Infantry-Regiment von Donop	Colonel David von Gosen	580	
Loos's Brigade	Colonel Johann August von Loos		
Fusilier Regiment von Alt Lossberg	Colonel Johann August von Loos	276	Grenadier Regiment von Woellworth was distributed between the two Fusilier regiments.
Fusilier Regiment von Knyphausen	Major Johann Friedrich von Stein	253	Grenadier Regiment von Woellworth was distributed between the two Fusilier regiments.
Grenadier Regiment von Woellworth		257	Grenadier Regiment von Woellworth was distributed between the two Fusilier regiments.
Provincial Infantry
Guides and pioneers	Captain Simon Fraser	206	
Roman Catholic Volunteers	Lieutenant Colonel Alfred Clifton	207	
Maryland Loyalists	Lieutenant Colonel James Chalmers	370	
Pennsylvania Loyalists	Lieutenant Colonel William Allen	168	
New Jersey Volunteers	Lieutenant Colonel John Van Dyke	211	
Bucks County Volunteers	Captain William Thomas	76	
Provincial Horse
Philadelphia Light Dragoons	Captain Richard Hovenden	116	
Bucks County Light Dragoons	Lieutenant Walter Willet	60	
Provincial Recruits
3rd Battalion of New Jersey Volunteers		17	
Caledonian Volunteers	Captain William Sutherland	9	
Volunteers of Ireland	Lieutenant Colonel Francis Lord Rawdon	16	
Emmericks Chasseurs	Captain Christian Huck	11	
Noncombatants
Black pioneers	Captain Allen Stewart	49	The quantity shown for women represents the official figure of those granted permission to accompany the army. Because many women who were supposed to have been transported from Philadelphia by sea chose to accompany the army overland, the actual number was greater.
Paymaster's guard and suite		10	The quantity shown for women represents the official figure of those granted permission to accompany the army. Because many women who were supposed to have been transported from Philadelphia by sea chose to accompany the army overland, the actual number was greater.
Lieutenant Colonel Rawdon's guard and suite		3	The quantity shown for women represents the official figure of those granted permission to accompany the army. Because many women who were supposed to have been transported from Philadelphia by sea chose to accompany the army overland, the actual number was greater.
Deputy Inspector General of Provincial Forces	Captain Henry Rooke	3	The quantity shown for women represents the official figure of those granted permission to accompany the army. Because many women who were supposed to have been transported from Philadelphia by sea chose to accompany the army overland, the actual number was greater.
Quartermaster General Department	Sir William Erskine	494	The quantity shown for women represents the official figure of those granted permission to accompany the army. Because many women who were supposed to have been transported from Philadelphia by sea chose to accompany the army overland, the actual number was greater.
Engineer's Department		138	The quantity shown for women represents the official figure of those granted permission to accompany the army. Because many women who were supposed to have been transported from Philadelphia by sea chose to accompany the army overland, the actual number was greater.
Bridgemaster's Department		21	The quantity shown for women represents the official figure of those granted permission to accompany the army. Because many women who were supposed to have been transported from Philadelphia by sea chose to accompany the army overland, the actual number was greater.
Royal Artillery Company of Conductors and Artificers		51	The quantity shown for women represents the official figure of those granted permission to accompany the army. Because many women who were supposed to have been transported from Philadelphia by sea chose to accompany the army overland, the actual number was greater.
Surgeons etc.		19	The quantity shown for women represents the official figure of those granted permission to accompany the army. Because many women who were supposed to have been transported from Philadelphia by sea chose to accompany the army overland, the actual number was greater.
Sick and attendants of general hospital		134	The quantity shown for women represents the official figure of those granted permission to accompany the army. Because many women who were supposed to have been transported from Philadelphia by sea chose to accompany the army overland, the actual number was greater.
Provost Martial, guard, prisoners and criminals		57	The quantity shown for women represents the official figure of those granted permission to accompany the army. Because many women who were supposed to have been transported from Philadelphia by sea chose to accompany the army overland, the actual number was greater.
Refugees		91	The quantity shown for women represents the official figure of those granted permission to accompany the army. Because many women who were supposed to have been transported from Philadelphia by sea chose to accompany the army overland, the actual number was greater.
Women		318	The quantity shown for women represents the official figure of those granted permission to accompany the army. Because many women who were supposed to have been transported from Philadelphia by sea chose to accompany the army overland, the actual number was greater.
Children		6	The quantity shown for women represents the official figure of those granted permission to accompany the army. Because many women who were supposed to have been transported from Philadelphia by sea chose to accompany the army overland, the actual number was greater.

=== Artillery ===
The artillery was divided between the two divisions.

Unit	Commander	Strength	Notes
Artillery	Brigadier General James Pattison		
Royal Artillery		634	The British employed a mix of howitzers and 1.5-, 3-, 6-, 12- and 24-pounder guns. The New Jersey Volunteers comprised four companies of matrosses.
Drivers		261	The British employed a mix of howitzers and 1.5-, 3-, 6-, 12- and 24-pounder guns. The New Jersey Volunteers comprised four companies of matrosses.
2nd Battalion, New Jersey Volunteers		129	The British employed a mix of howitzers and 1.5-, 3-, 6-, 12- and 24-pounder guns. The New Jersey Volunteers comprised four companies of matrosses.
Hessian Artillery		39	The British employed a mix of howitzers and 1.5-, 3-, 6-, 12- and 24-pounder guns. The New Jersey Volunteers comprised four companies of matrosses.
Anspach Artillery		34	The British employed a mix of howitzers and 1.5-, 3-, 6-, 12- and 24-pounder guns. The New Jersey Volunteers comprised four companies of matrosses.
Noncombatants
Women		34	Number of women granted permission to accompany the army. Because many women who were supposed to have been transported from Philadelphia by sea chose to accompany the army overland, the actual number was greater.
Children		3	Number of women granted permission to accompany the army. Because many women who were supposed to have been transported from Philadelphia by sea chose to accompany the army overland, the actual number was greater.

== American order of battle ==
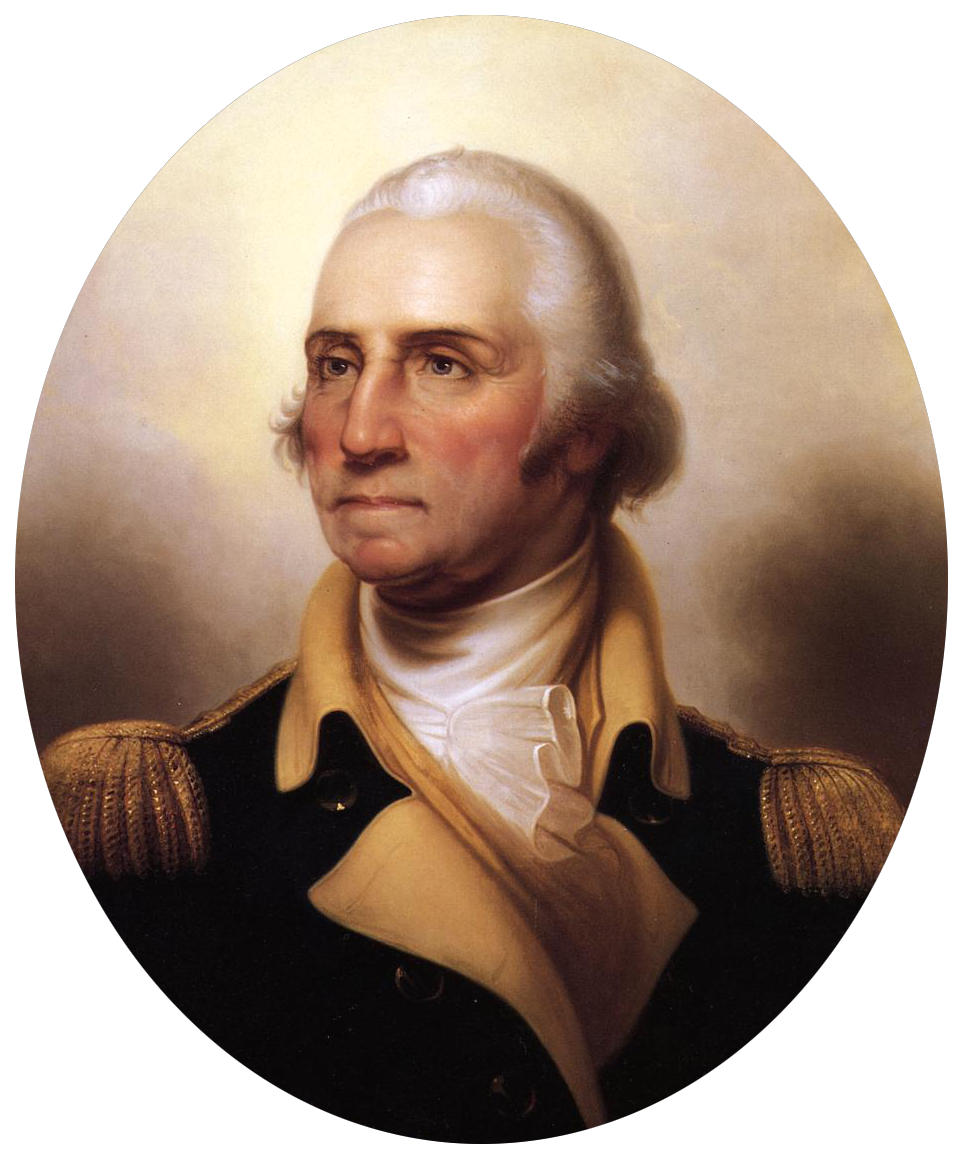
George Washington

General George Washington (est. 15,000–16,000)
{Curly Brackets indicate Brigade/Regimental/Battalion Strength}

- Staff:
  - Quartermaster General: Major General Nathanael Greene
  - Inspector General: Major General: Friedrich Wilhelm von Steuben
  - Senior Artillery Officer: Brigadier General Henry Knox
  - Senior Engineer Officer: Brigadier General Louis Lebègue Duportail
  - Adjutant General: Colonel Alexander Scammell
  - Commissary Generals: Colonels Jeremiah Wadsworth and Clement Biddle
  - Judge Advocate General: Colonel John Laurance
  - Military Secretary: Lieutenant Colonel Robert H. Harrison
  - Assistant Secretary: James McHenry
  - Aide-de-Camp: Lieutenant Colonels John Fitzgerald, Alexander Hamilton, John Laurens and Richard Kidder Meade
  - Volunteer Aides-de-Camp: Brigadier Generals Joseph Reed and John Cadwalader

=== Vanguard ===
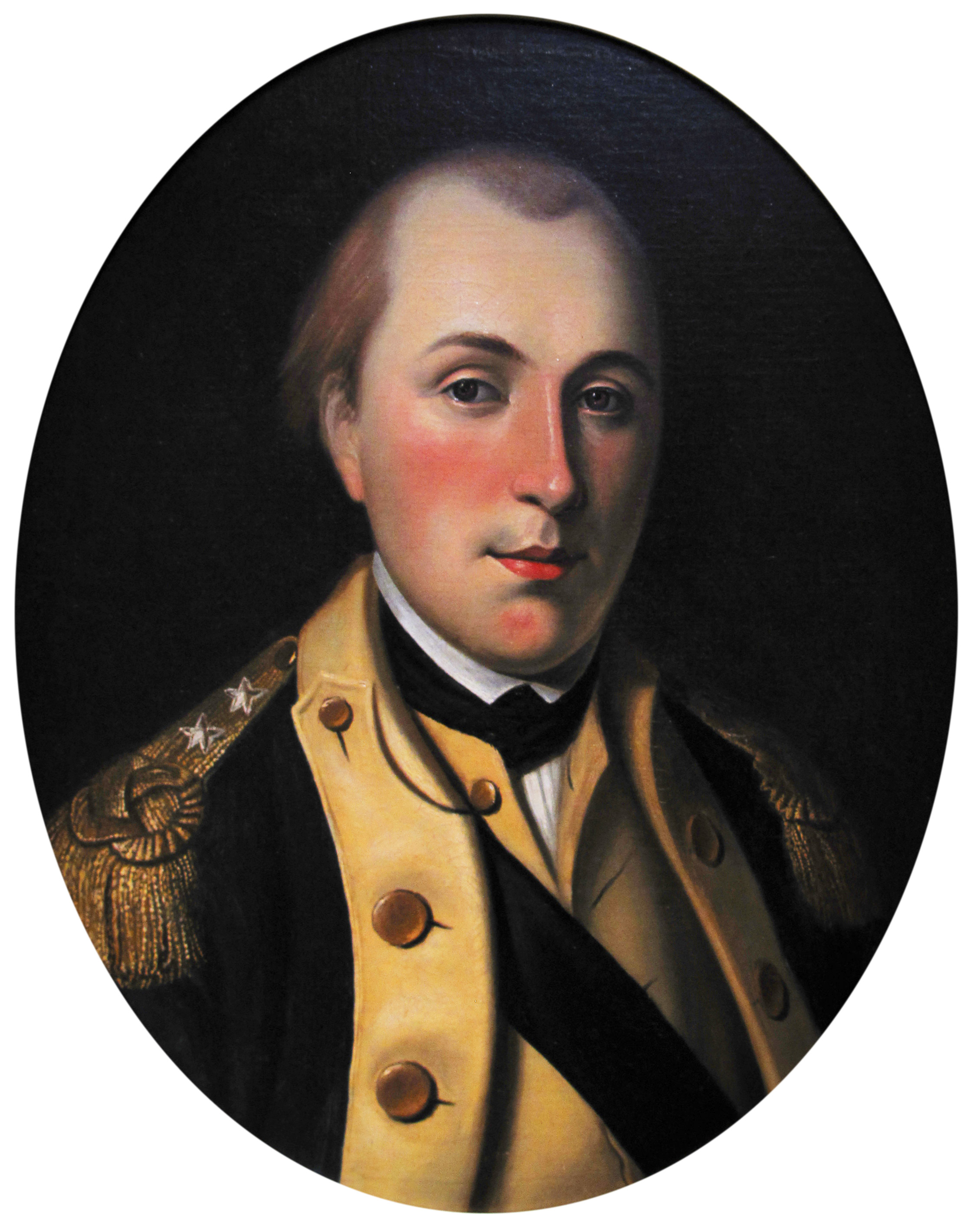
Marquis de La Fayette

The vanguard was commanded by Major General Charles Lee and comprised approximately 4,540 troops.

- Staff:
  - Acting Adjutant General: Lieutenant Colonel John Brooks
  - Aide-de-camp: Captains John Francis Mercer and Evan Edwards
  - Senior Artillery Officer: Lieutenant Colonel Eleazer Oswald
  - Deputy Inspector: Jean Baptiste Ternant
  - Advisers: Brigadier General David Forman and Colonel Marquis François de Malmedy

Unit	Commander	Strength	Notes
Scott's Brigade	Colonel William Grayson	600	
Combined 4th, 8th and 12th Virginia Regiments*	Colonel William Grayson		
Grayson's and Patton's Additional Continental Regiments	Lieutenant Colonel John Parke		
Company, Crane's Artillery Regiment	Captain Thomas Wells	2 guns	
Varnum's Brigade	Colonel John Durkee	300–350	
Combined 4th and 8th Connecticut Regiments	Colonel John Durkee		
Combined 1st and 2nd Rhode Island Regiments	Lieutenant Colonel Jeremiah Olney		
Company, Crane's Artillery Regiment	Captain David Cook	2 guns	
Wayne's Detachment	Brigadier General Anthony Wayne*	1,000	Commanded by Major General the Marquis de Lafayette during the morning attack on the British rearguard.
Livingston's Battalion	Colonel Henry Beekman Livingston		Picked men (elite, ad hoc light infantry battalions formed by taking the best troops from across all regiments).
Stewart's Battalion	Colonel Walter Stewart		Picked men (elite, ad hoc light infantry battalions formed by taking the best troops from across all regiments).
Wesson's Battalion	Colonel James Wesson		Picked men (elite, ad hoc light infantry battalions formed by taking the best troops from across all regiments).
Company, Crane's Artillery Regiment	Captain Thomas Seward	2 guns	
Scott's Detachment	Brigadier General Charles Scott	1,440	
Cilley's Battalion	Colonel Joseph Cilley		Picked men
Parker's Battalion	Colonel Richard Parker		Picked men
Butler's Battalion*	Colonel Richard Butler		Picked men
Gist's Battalion	Colonel Nathaniel Gist		Picked men
Artillery		4 guns	Unit not known
Jackson's Detachment*	Colonel Henry Jackson	200–300	
Jackson's Additional Continental Regiment	Colonel Henry Jackson		
Henley's Additional Continental Regiment	Unknown		
Lee's Additional Continental Regiment	Unknown		
New Jersey Brigade	Brigadier General William Maxwell	1,000	
1st New Jersey Regiment	Colonel Matthias Ogden		
2nd New Jersey Regiment	Colonel Israel Shreve		
3rd New Jersey Regiment	Colonel Elias Dayton		
4th New Jersey Regiment	Lieutenant Colonel David Brearley		
Independent artillery company	Captain Thomas Randall	2 guns	
New Jersey Militia Light Horse	Lieutenant Colonel Anthony Walton White		
Somerset County Light Horse	Captain John Stryker		
Middlesex County Light Horse	Captain Robert Nixon		

* Lee reshuffled his troops before launching his attack on the British rearguard, and put Wayne in charge of a detachment comprising Grayson's combined Virginia regiments, Butler's battalion and Jackson's detachment. Lafayette took over command of Wayne's original detachment.

=== Other advanced forces ===
Unit	Commander	Strength	Notes
New Jersey and Pennsylvania Militia	Major General Philemon Dickinson	1,200+	
Hunterdon Light Horse	Captain Israel Carle		Operating from Tennent's Meeting House
1st Burlington	Colonel William Shreve		Operating from Tennent's Meeting House
1st Cumberland	Lieutenant Colonel Samuel Ogden		Operating from Tennent's Meeting House
2nd Cumberland	Major Thomas Ewing		Operating from Tennent's Meeting House
1st Essex	Colonel Samuel Potter		Operating from Tennent's Meeting House
2nd Essex	Colonel Philip Van Courtland		Operating from Tennent's Meeting House
Hunterdon Artillery (as infantry)	Captain Joseph Clunn		Operating from Tennent's Meeting House
1st Hunterdon	Colonel Joseph Philips		Operating from Tennent's Meeting House
2nd Hunterdon	Colonel Joseph Beavers		Operating from Tennent's Meeting House
3rd Hunterdon	Colonel David Chambers		Operating from Tennent's Meeting House
4th Hunterdon	Colonel John Taylor		Operating from Tennent's Meeting House
3rd Middlesex	Colonel Jacob Hyer		Operating from Tennent's Meeting House
1st Salem	Colonel Samuel Dick		Operating from Tennent's Meeting House
1st Somerset	Colonel Frederick Frelinghuysen		Operating from Tennent's Meeting House
2nd Somerset	Hendrick Van Dyke		Operating from Tennent's Meeting House
Pennsylvania Volunteers	Brigadier General John Cadwalader		Operating from Tennent's Meeting House
Eastern Morris and other militia	Colonel Sylvanus Seely		Operating from Foreman's Mill
1st Middlesex	Colonel John Webster		Operating from the vicinity of Scots Meeting House and Van Doren's Mill
2nd Middlesex	Colonel John Neilson		Operating from the vicinity of Scots Meeting House and Van Doren's Mill
3rd Monmouth	Colonel Daniel Hendrickson		Operating from the vicinity of Scots Meeting House and Van Doren's Mill
Rifle and light infantry detachment	Colonel Daniel Morgan	824	Because of a series of miscommunications, Morgan remained at Richmond Mills, some two miles (three kilometres) to the south of Monmouth Court House, and did not participate in the battle.
Various			Rifle companies detached from the 1st, 4th and 12th Pennsylvania Regiments, and from the 6th, 7th, 8th and 11th Virginia Regiments Light infantry companies detached from the 1st and 2nd North Carolina Regiments; Detachment of Washington's life guards
1st Monmouth	Colonel Asher Holmes		New Jersey Militia
2nd Monmouth	Colonel Samuel Forman		New Jersey Militia
2nd Burlington	Lieutenant Colonel Joseph Haight		New Jersey Militia
Monmouth County Artillery	Captain Joshua Huddy		New Jersey Militia
Dragoon detachment	Colonel Stephen Moylan		Harassed the British 2nd Division as it marched towards Middletown
Detachments of the 1st, 3rd and 4th Light Dragoons			
Source: Lender & Stone 2016, pp. 453–455

=== Main line of defenses ===
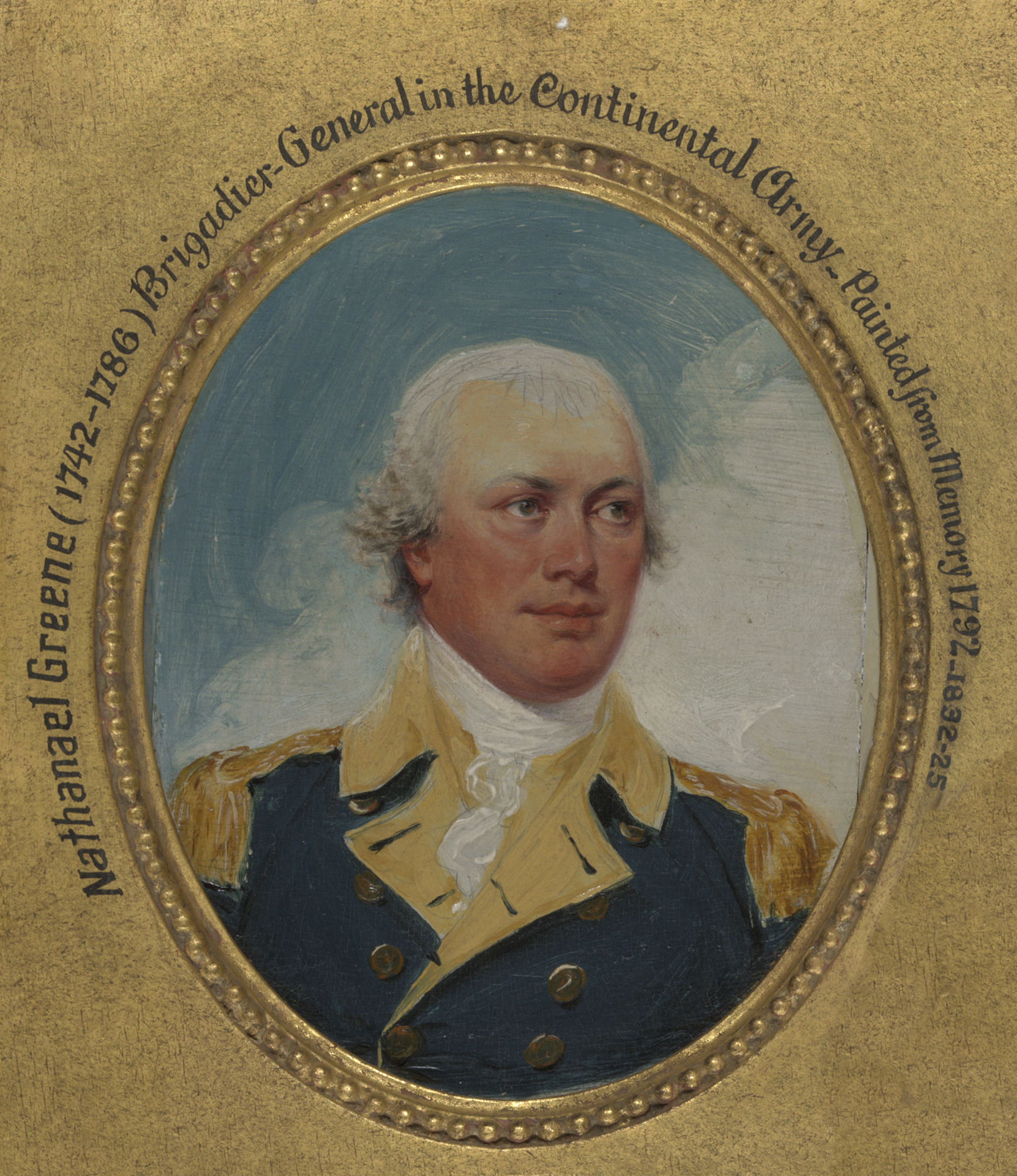
Nathanael Greene

Unit	Commander	Strength	Notes
Learned's Brigade	Colonel John Bailey (probable)	373	
2nd Massachusetts Regiment	Colonel John Bailey		
8th Massachusetts Regiment	Colonel Michael Jackson		
9th Massachusetts Regiment	Colonel James Wesson*		
Glover's Brigade	Unknown	636	
1st Massachusetts Regiment	Colonel Joseph Vose		
4th Massachusetts Regiment	Colonel William Shepard		
13th Massachusetts Regiment	Colonel Edward Wigglesworth		
15th Massachusetts Regiment	Colonel Timothy Bigelow		
Huntington's Brigade	Brigadier General Jedediah Huntington	632	
1st and 7th Connecticut Regiments	Colonel Hernan Swift		
2nd and 5th Connecticut Regiments	Colonel Philip Burr Bradley		
Poor's Brigade	Brigadier General Enoch Poor	754	
1st New Hampshire Regiment	Colonel Joseph Cilley*		
2nd New Hampshire Regiment	Lieutenant Colonel George Reid		
3rd New Hampshire Regiment	Lieutenant Colonel Henry Dearborn*		
2nd New York Regiment	Colonel Philip Van Cortlandt		
4th New York Regiment	Colonel Henry Beekman Livingston*		
Artillery	Brigadier General Henry Knox	10–12 guns	
* Detached from their regiments to lead detachments of picked men.
Source: Lender & Stone 2016, pp. 457–458.

=== Forward screen ===
Unit	Commander	Strength	Notes
Scott's detachment (partial)	Brigadier General Charles Scott	c.720	
Cilley's Battalion	Colonel Joseph Cilley		Picked men
Parker's Battalion	Colonel Richard Parker		Picked men
1st Pennsylvania Brigade	Brigadier General Anthony Wayne*	429	Colonel William Irvine took over in Wayne's absence
1st Pennsylvania Regiment	Colonel James Chambers		
2nd Pennsylvania Regiment	Colonel Henry Bicker		
7th Pennsylvania Regiment	Colonel William Irvine		
10th Pennsylvania Regiment	Colonel George Nagel		
2nd Pennsylvania Brigade	Unknown	487	
1st New York Regiment	Colonel Goose Van Schaick		
4th Pennsylvania Regiment	Lieutenant Colonel William Butler*		
5th Pennsylvania Regiment	Colonel Francis Johnston		
11th Pennsylvania Regiment	Colonel Richard Humpton(?)		
3rd Pennsylvania Brigade	Colonel Oliver Spencer (probable)	438	
3rd Pennsylvania Regiment	Colonel Thomas Craig		
6th Pennsylvania Regiment	Lieutenant Colonel Josiah Harmar		
9th Pennsylvania Regiment	Colonel Richard Butler*		
12th Pennsylvania Regiment	Unknown		
Malcolm's Additional Continental Regiment	Lieutenant Colonel Aaron Burr		
Spencer's Additional Continental Regiment	Colonel Oliver Spencer		
* Detached from their regiments to lead detachments of picked men.
Source: Lender & Stone 2016, pp. 456–457.

=== Reserve (Perrine Hill) ===
Forces commanded by Lafayette shadowed the British flanking column then rested behind the main defensive line at Perrine Hill.

Unit	Commander	Strength	Notes
North Carolina Brigade	Colonel Thomas Clark	425	
1st North Carolina Regiment	Colonel Thomas Clark		
2nd North Carolina Regiment	Colonel John Patten		
1st Maryland Brigade	Brigadier General William Smallwood	790	
1st Maryland Regiment	Colonel John Hoskins Stone		
3rd Maryland Regiment	Colonel Mordecai Gist*		
5th Maryland Regiment	Colonel William Richardson		
7th Maryland Regiment	Colonel John Gunby		
1st Delaware Regiment	Colonel David Hall		
New Jersey Brigade (partial)	Unknown	c.500	
2nd New Jersey Regiment	Colonel Israel Shreve		
1st New Jersey Regiment	Colonel Matthias Ogden		
Source: Lender & Stone 2016, p. 458.

=== Combs Hill ===
When the main body reached Tennent's Meeting House, some two miles (three kilometres) east of Englishtown, Washington ordered Major General Nathanael Greene to take a brigade to cover the right flank. Greene was guided to Combs Hill by Lieutenant Colonel David Rhea of the 2nd New Jersey Militia.

Unit	Commander	Strength	Notes
Woodford's Brigade	Brigadier General William Woodford	475	
3rd and 7th Virginia Regiments	Lieutenant Colonel Holt Richardson		
11th and 15th Virginia Regiments	Lieutenant Colonel John Cropper		
Artillery	Lieutenant Colonel Thomas-Antoine de Mauduit du Plessis	4 guns	
Source: Lender & Stone 2016, p. 459.

=== Reserve (Englishtown) ===
Washington sent four brigades under Major General Friedrich Wilhelm von Steuben back to Englishtown to form a reserve.

Unit	Commander	Strength	Notes
Paterson's Brigade	Brigadier General John Paterson	485	
10th Massachusetts Regiment	Colonel Thomas Marshall		
11th Massachusetts Regiment	Colonel Benjamin Tupper		
12th Massachusetts Regiment	Colonel Samuel Brewer		
14th Massachusetts Regiment	Colonel Gamaliel Bradford		
2nd Maryland Brigade	Unknown	602	
2nd Maryland Regiment	Lieutenant Colonel Thomas Woolford		
4th Maryland Regiment	Colonel Josias Carvil Hall		
6th Maryland Regiment	Colonel Otho Holland Williams		
Muhlenberg's Brigade	Brigadier General Peter Muhlenberg	711	
1st, 5th and 9th Virginia Regiments	Colonel Richard Parker*		
1st Virginia State Regiment	Colonel George Gibson		
2nd Virginia State Regiment	Colonel Gregory Smith		
German Battalion	Lieutenant Colonel Ludowick Weltner		
Weeden's Brigade	Brigadier General George Weeden	587	
2nd Virginia Regiment	Colonel Christian Febiger		
6th Virginia Regiment	Colonel John Gibson		
10th Virginia Regiment	Colonel John Green		
14th Virginia Regiment	Colonel William Davies		
* Detached from regiment to lead a detachment of picked men.
Source: Lender & Stone 2016, pp. 460–461.

== Notes ==
Footnotes

Citations
