= George Gibson (Continental Army officer) =

Continental Army officer during the American Revolutionary War

- Allegiance: United States
- Branch: Continental Army
- Service years: 1777–1779
- Rank: Colonel
- Commands: 1st Virginia State Regiment
- Conflicts: Philadelphia campaign: Valley Forge encampment; Battle of Monmouth

George Gibson was an officer in the Continental Army during the American Revolutionary War. He served as colonel of the 1st Virginia State Regiment during its Continental Army service from 1777 to 1779.

== Revolutionary War service ==
=== Virginia appointment and Continental service ===
In December 1776, the Virginia General Assembly authorized the formation of the 1st Virginia State Regiment as part of the Commonwealth's regular military establishment. In 1777, the regiment was placed in Continental service under Gibson due to Virginia's difficulty meeting its troop quotas.

Gibson's role was primarily administrative and operational, overseeing the regiment's integration into Continental Army service.

=== Campaign service ===
During his command, the regiment participated in the Philadelphia campaign, including winter quarters at Valley Forge and later combat at the Battle of Monmouth.

== Later service and uncertainty ==
The regiment returned to Virginia state service in 1779. Surviving records do not clearly document Gibson's subsequent military career or confirm any continued unified regimental command.

== Bibliography ==
- Flagg, C. A.; Waters, W. O. (1913). "Virginia Soldiers in the Revolution". The Virginia Magazine of History and Biography. 21 (4): 337–346.
- Hening, William Waller (1821). The Statutes at Large; Being a Collection of All the Laws of Virginia. Vol. 9. Richmond: J. & G. Cochran.
- Shelby, John E. (1988). The Revolution in Virginia, 1775–1783. Charlottesville: University Press of Virginia.
- Wright, Robert K. Jr. (1983). The Continental Army. Army Lineage Series. Washington, D.C.: Center of Military History, United States Army.
- Revolutionary War Rolls, 1775–1783. National Archives Microfilm Publication M246. Vol. Rolls 93–94. National Archives.
