= William Belford =

General William Belford
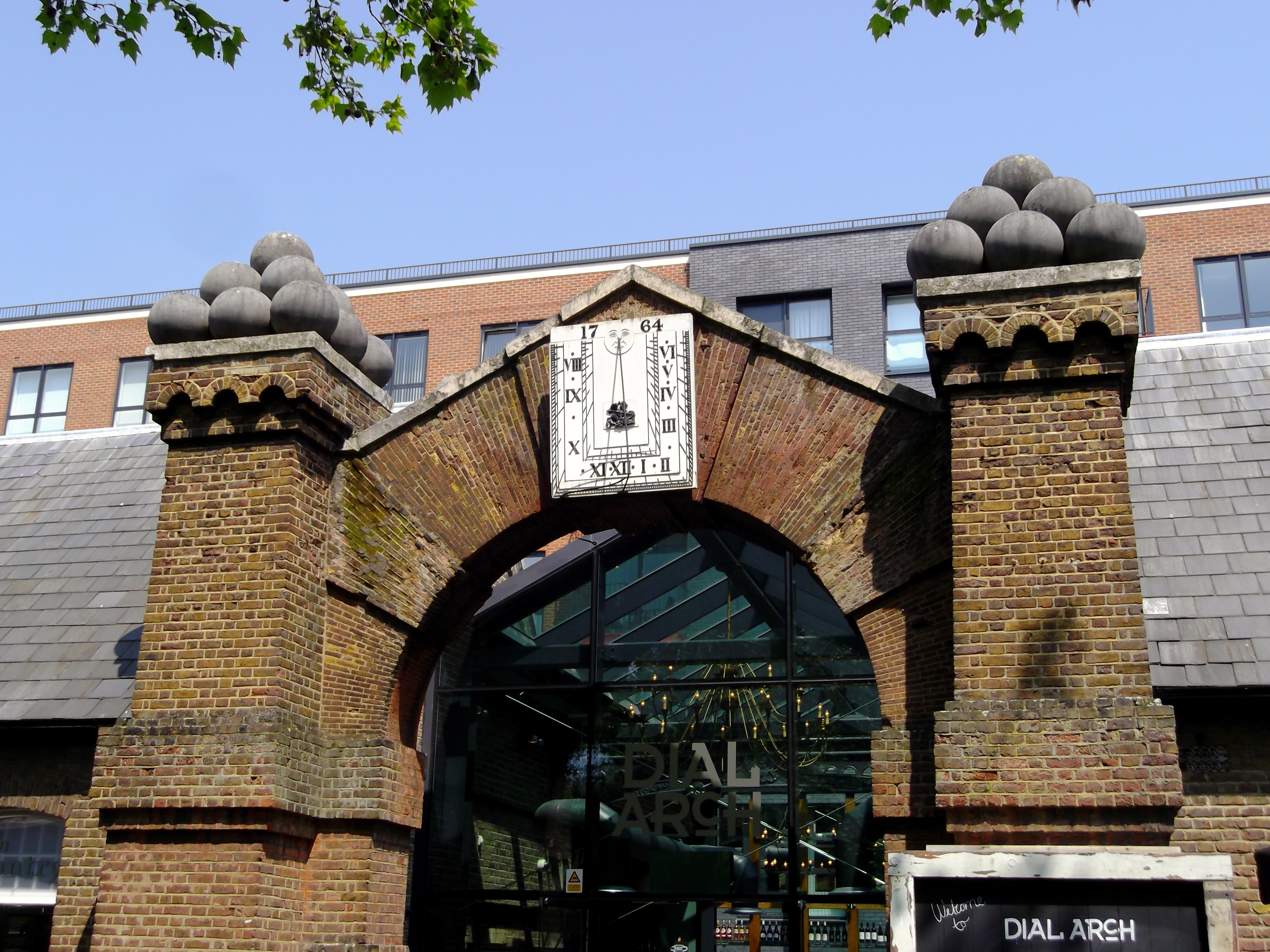
- Dial Square, Royal Arsenal
- Born: about 1712; Maidstone, Kent
- Died: 1 July 1780; Dial Square, Royal Arsenal
- Military career
- Allegiance: Great Britain
- Branch: British Army
- Service years: 1726–1758
- Rank: General 29 August 1777
- Units: Colonel, Royal Regiment of Artillery 1751–1758
- Commands: Commandant of the Royal Arsenal 1758–1780
- Conflicts: War of Jenkins' Ear; Cartagena de Indias; War of the Austrian Succession; Dettingen Fontenoy; Jacobite rising of 1745; Second Siege of Carlisle Culloden

General William Belford (c. 1712 – 1 July 1780) was a British artillery officer who began his career in 1726. He was part of the first generation of artillery officers selected and promoted on merit, rather than connections.

From 1743 to 1748, he served under the Duke of Cumberland in Flanders and Britain during the Jacobite rising of 1745. In 1751, he became Colonel of the Royal Regiment of Artillery, then of the First Battalion when this was expanded in 1757. He was Commandant of the Royal Arsenal from 1758 until his death in July 1780.

== Life ==
William Belford was baptised at Maidstone, Kent on 11 October 1712, the son of Gustavus Belford and Sarah Duke. Gustavus Belford was a Captain of a Troop in his Majesty's own Royal Regiment of Dragoons and died in Chelsea on 26 June 1738. Gustavus Belford married Sarah Duke at Dartford, Kent on 16 December 1704. They had at least 12 children with only William, Hester (married William Harris in 1761), Mary (married William Pemble in 1761) and Elizabeth (married Dale Lovett in 1759) surviving to adulthood. A family slab in All Saints' Church, Maidstone records the deaths of Mrs Mary Pemble, daughter of Captain Gustaves Belford and sister to Lieutenant General William Belford, who died 24 February 1774 aged 58 years. Also General Belford many years Commander of the First Battalion of Royal Artillery who died 1 July 1780 aged 68. Mrs Elizth Lovett who died 29 April 1785 aged 66 and Mrs Esther Harris another daughter of Captain Gustaves Belford and sister to General Belford who died 16 Dec. 1785 aged 72 years.

William Belford married Martha Schalch, the daughter of Andrew Schalch, a colleague at the Royal Arsenal, on 29 March 1744 at Woolwich, Kent. They had 6 children Andrew Schalch (1745 - 1746), William (Captain, Horse Grenadier Guards b abt 1746 - d Nantes, France 1786), Sarah (1747 - 1750), Mary (abt 1749 - 1749), Gustavus (Colonel, Royal Horse Guards b 1751 - d Southtown, Suffolk 1816), and Rachel (1754 - 1754). His wife Martha died at Woolwich in July 1766. General Belford owned "the Grove" at Boxley near Maidstone. British History online reports that he left "by the daughter of Mr. Schalch, of Woolwich, two sons and one daughter; the sons, Gustavus and William, were both officers in the army, and by their father’s will became jointly possessed of this estate".

General William Belford had another son, also called William (b 15 March 1762 - d Woolwich, Kent Oct 1841), with Mary Barber. In General Belford's 1777 will and Codicils to his will, Mary Barber was provided with a substantial legacy. In the will, it states that Mary Barber was “now living with me” and that William Belford otherwise Barber was about eleven and a student at Rochester. This William was appointed an ensign with the 13th Foot, later Somerset Light Infantry, which spent many years in the West Indies. He became a Lt. Colonel of the 3rd Veteran Battalion and in 1824 was appointed to be Fort Major of Dartmouth Castle. In 1825, his son wrote to the Lord Lieutenant seeking financial assistance.

== Career ==
Until the early 18th century, the majority of British regiments were raised for specific campaigns and disbanded on completion. An exception were small numbers of trained gunners based in key locations like the Tower of London and controlled by the Ordnance Office, which provided personnel for the artillery 'traynes' used in field campaigns. However, the military was becoming increasingly professional, particularly in the areas of artillery and engineering and Britain's lack of a consistent approach was a weakness; Vauban had established a French Corps royal des ingénieurs militaires as far back as 1690.

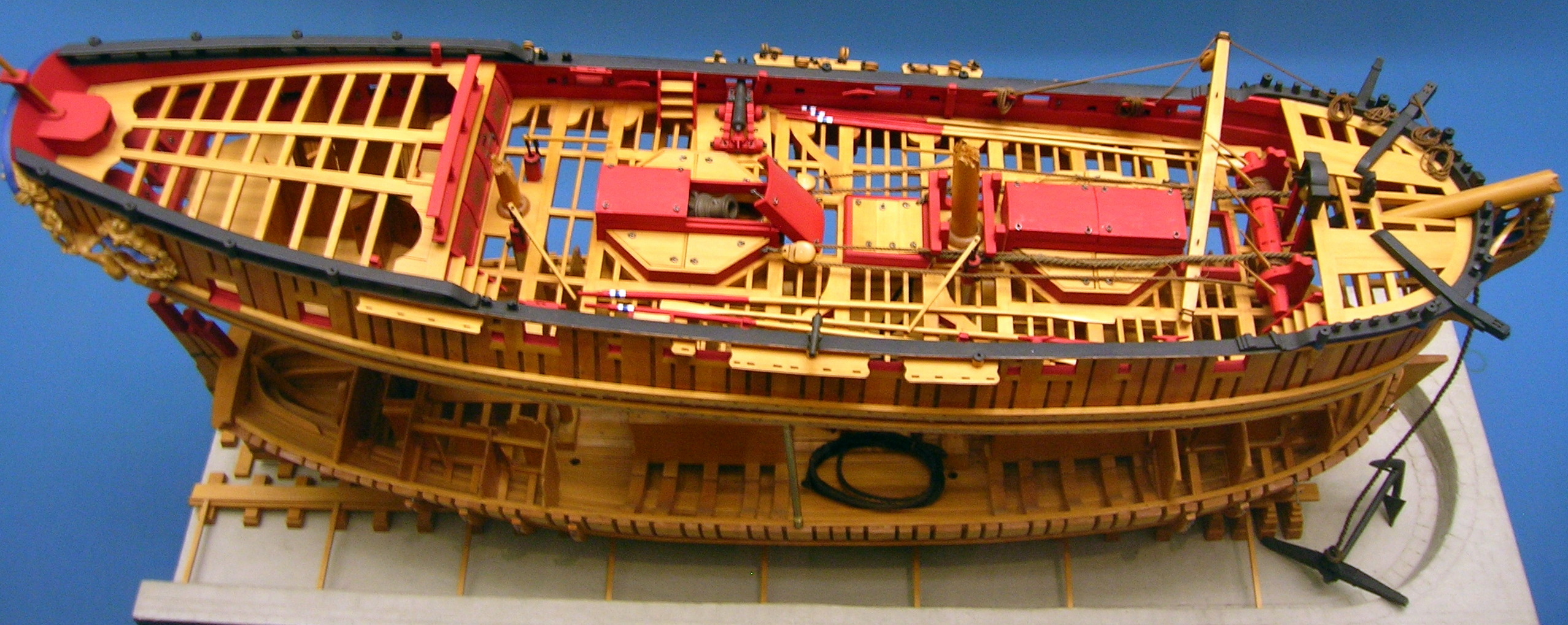
Bomb vessel, ca 1742; note mortar sites in middle (red hatches). Belford served on one in 1738

The Ordnance Board had a reputation for inefficiency and after Marlborough was restored as Master-General of the Ordnance in 1714, he initiated a series of reforms. This included the establishment in 1716 of two permanent companies of field artillery, which became the Royal Regiment of Artillery in 1720. Its first commander was Colonel Albert Borgard, a Dane who had served in the British army since 1698.

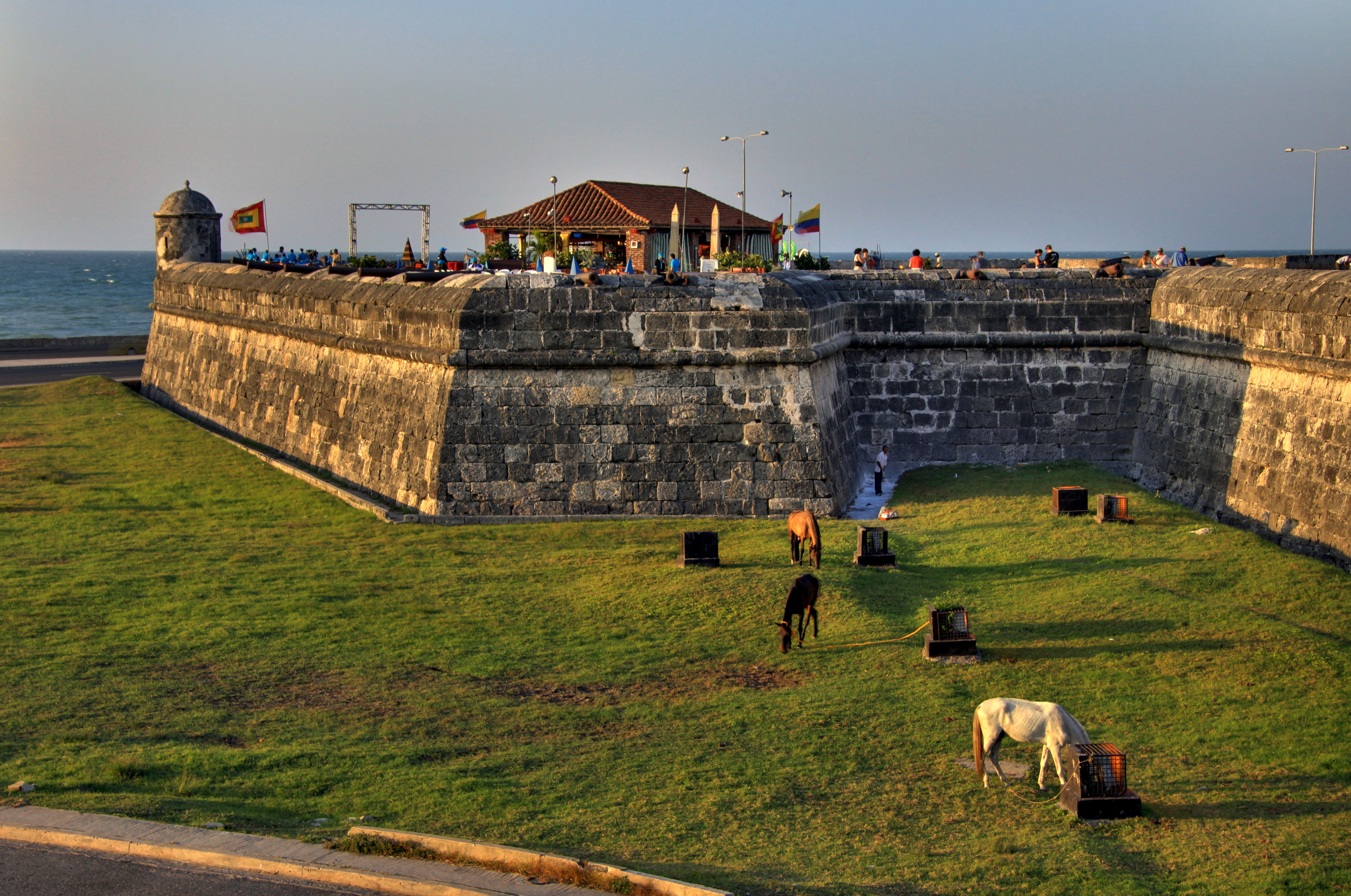
Part of the defences at Cartagena de Indias in modern Colombia; Belford served in the unsuccessful assault of March 1741

Belford joined the artillery as a cadet in 1726; unlike the rest of the army which used the commission purchase system, selection and promotion within the Royal Artillery was largely based on merit. He quickly showed technical aptitude in a number of areas, including periods spent aboard a bomb vessel in 1738 and with the sappers and miners, later the Royal Engineers in 1739.

During the War of Jenkins' Ear with Spain, he joined the expeditionary force sent to the Spanish West Indies in 1740. In March 1741, he served in the disastrous assault on Cartagena de Indias, a defeat that ended the career of long-serving prime minister Robert Walpole. Almost forgotten in Britain, this victory is still remembered in Colombia; a plaque commemorating the 1741 attack was unveiled during a state visit by Prince Charles in 2014, then subsequently removed after protests against 'glorifying English pirates.'

Over 6,000 men died from yellow fever and the survivors returned to Britain in October 1742 with little to show for the investment of men and money. Belford enhanced his reputation and was promoted to captain, although survival in itself was an achievement; from 1740 to 1742, British navy and army deaths from disease and combat were over 20,000, with death rates of 80-90% among land forces.

In the War of the Austrian Succession, he served in Flanders under the Duke of Cumberland and fought at Dettingen in 1743 and Fontenoy in 1745. During the Jacobite rising of 1745, he supervised the artillery at the Second Siege of Carlisle in December 1745 and Culloden in April 1746. He returned to Flanders and was promoted Colonel in December 1746, with a number of senior but elderly officers being retired. He placed a much greater focus on training and discipline, including small arms instruction and weapons drill for his gunners; until then, close protection was provided by the infantry and their flight resulted in the artillery being over-run at Prestonpans and Falkirk.

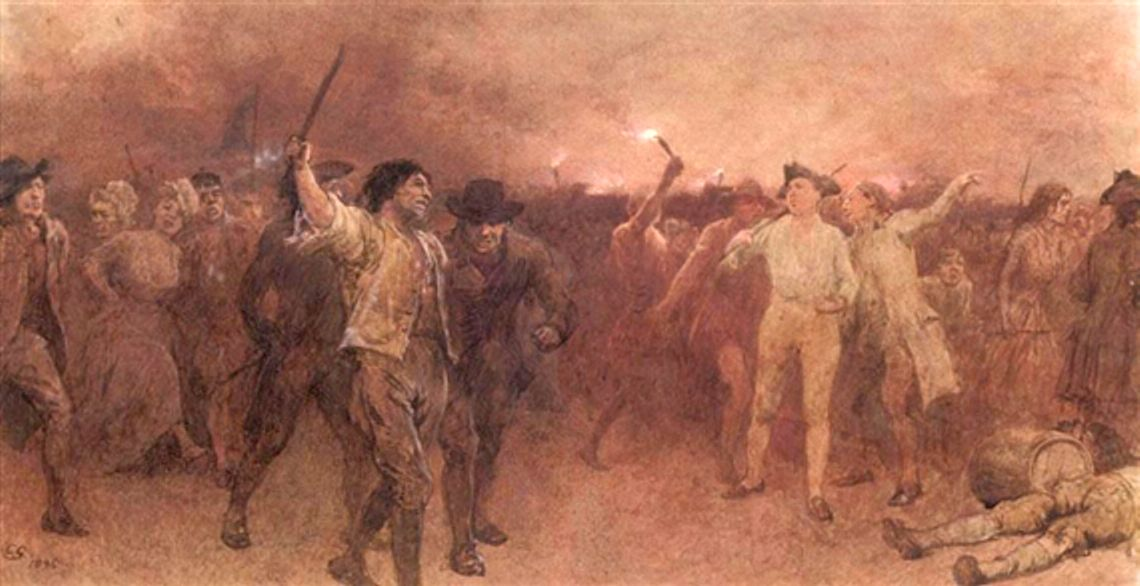
The Gordon Riots, June 1780; Belford died shortly after defending the Royal Arsenal against looters

He succeeded Borgard as Colonel of the regiment in 1751, then of the First Battalion when a second battalion was created in 1757. He relinquished this in 1758 when was appointed Commandant of the Royal Arsenal, then promoted General in 1777. By the time of his death in 1780, the Royal Artillery included four battalions and two "invalid companies" used for garrison duties, with a total strength of 5,241 men and officers.

Belford was at the Royal Arsenal during the Gordon Riots of June 1780, which began when Protestant workers in London demonstrated against the 1778 Papists Act reducing restrictions on Catholics. This led to widespread looting and violence that ended only when the army was called out on 7 June; over 300 people died, with extensive damage to Catholic property and immigrant areas like Moorfields. Rioters attempted to storm the Bank of England and the Arsenal was also a target; Belford successfully organised its defence and Parliament later voted him a gratuity of £330 for his 'good service.' However, on 1 July, he died in his rooms at the Arsenal after his efforts 'burst a blood-vessel, and brought on a fever, which carried him off in a few days.'

== Legacy ==
Belford championed the use of gun laying by using screw elevation rather than the traditional wedges or quoins. He also reportedly introduced the fife into the British army in 1748 by bringing a Hanoverian musician named Johann Ulrich to teach the instrument to the Royal Artillery Band.

== Sources ==
- Browning, Reed (1994). The War of the Austrian Succession. Sutton Publishing. ISBN 978-0750905787.
- Chandler David, Beckett Ian (1996). The Oxford History Of The British Army. Oxford University Press. ISBN 978-0-19-280311-5.
- Hasted, Edward (1798). 'Parishes: Boxley', in The History and Topographical Survey of the County of Kent: Volume 4. Canterbury Press.
- Hogg, Brigadier O.F.G. (1963). The Royal Arsenal. Oxford University Press.
- Journals of the House of Commons, Volume 37; November 1778 to August 1780. HMSO. 1803.
- Mousnier, Roland (1979). The Institutions of France Under the Absolute Monarchy, 1598-1789. University of Chicago Press. ISBN 978-0226543277.
- * Stephens, HM, Annis, PGW (ed) (2008). Belford, William (Online ed.). Oxford DNB.
- The Gentleman's Magazine; Volume I. 1780.
- Woodfine, PL (1987). "The War of Jenkins Ear; the Vernon-Wentworth debate". Journal of the Society for Army Historical Research. 65 (262).

Military offices
Preceded by Albert Borgard	Colonel, Royal Regiment of Artillery; 1751–1757	Succeeded by expanded
New title	Colonel, First Battalion, Royal Regiment of Artillery; 1757	Succeeded by
Preceded by	Commandant of the Royal Arsenal; 1758–1780	Succeeded by
