= Friedrich Wilhelm von Lossberg =

Hessian Lieutenant General

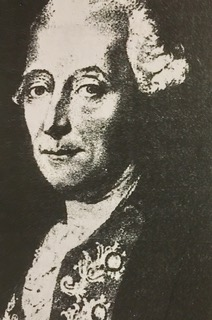
- Friedrich Wilhelm von Lossberg
- Born: 20 April 1720; Sylbach
- Died: 25 June 1800 (aged 80); Rinteln
- Military career
- Allegiance: Prussia; Hesse-Kassel
- Commands: Hessian auxiliaries
- Conflicts: American Revolutionary War

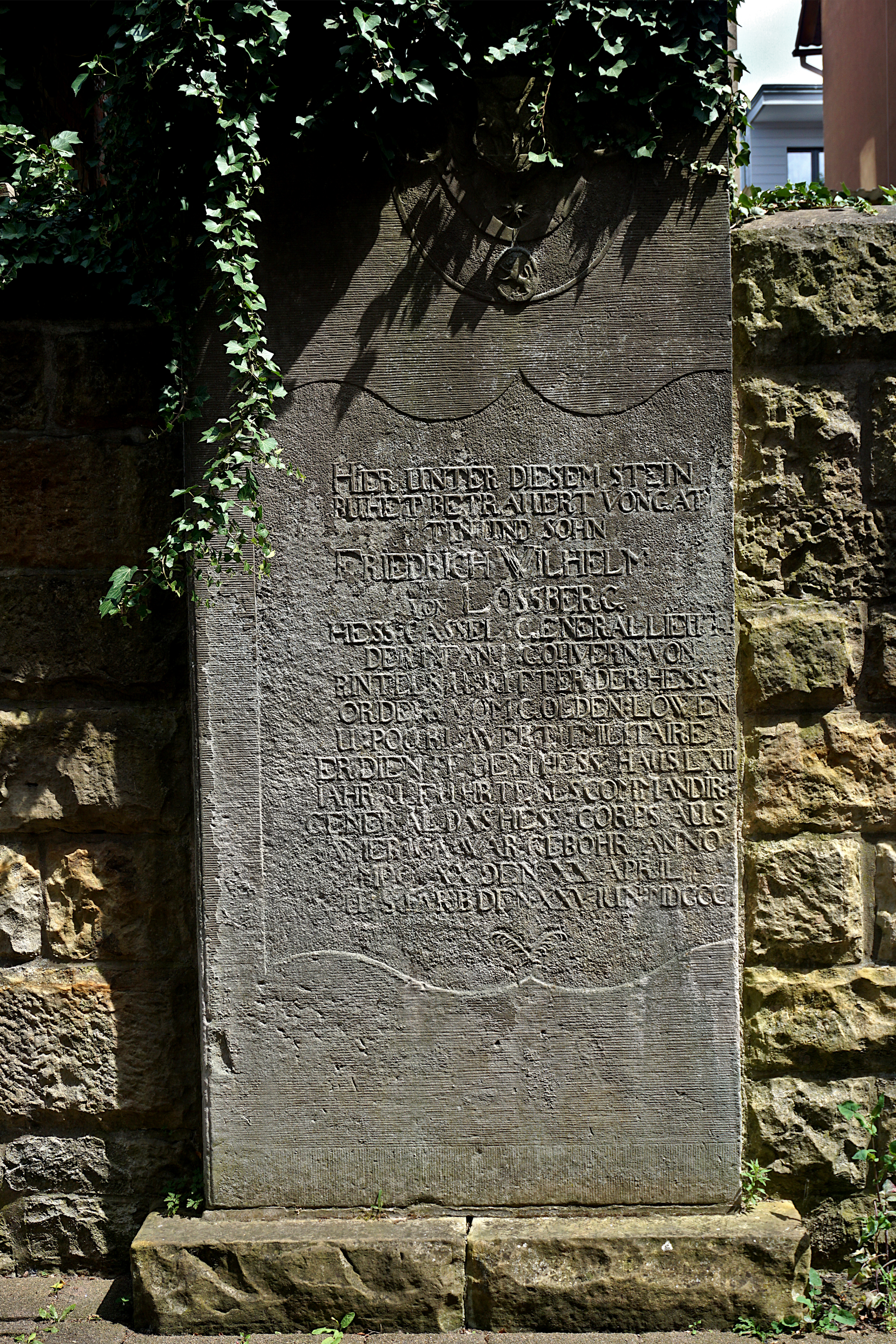
Leger stone in Rinteln

Friedrich Wilhelm von Lossberg (20 April 1720 – 25 June 1800) was a Hessian Lieutenant General fighting with the British-allied German contingents in the American Revolutionary War. He was sent to America in 1776 as a colonel commanding the First Brigade of the Second Hessian Division under Lieutenant General Wilhelm von Knyphausen. Von Knyphausen in turn was second in command under General Leopold Philip de Heister.

During the course of the war, in 1777, disagreements between General Sir William Howe and Heister led to the latter's recall, and Von Knyphausen replaced him. In May 1782, after the British surrender at the Battle of Yorktown in October 1781, Von Lossberg replaced Von Knyphausen as the last commander of the Hessian troops in North America.

== Early life ==
Von Lossberg was born in Sylbach, County of Lippe on 20 April 1720 and married Dorothea Elisabeth Gmeling (1725-1821). His son Johann Karl Jeremias von Lossberg (1750-1804) served as a lieutenant during the American Revolution with the Grenadierbataillon von Lengerke (made up of the Grenadier companies Leibinfanterie Regiment, Regiment Prinz Carl, Regiment Donop and Regiment Bose). Jeremias married Henriette von Kospoth, the daughter of Major General Heinrich Julius Graf von Kospoth (17 March 1724 – 26 February 1801) with whom Friedrich Wilhelm had served in the American War of Independence.

== War of the American Revolution ==
On 15 January 1776 Great Britain entered into a Subsidy Agreement with Frederick II, Landgrave of Hesse-Kassel to secure the services of 12,500 soldiers (raising to 17,000 during the course of the War). Frederick II was the uncle of King George III having married a member of the House of Hanover when he wed Princess Mary of Great Britain, the daughter of George II, and the king's aunt. George III was the grandson of George II.

The initial contingent of troops consisted of 15 infantry regiments of 5 companies each, four grenadier battalions, a Jäger corps and two batteries of artillery.

== Regiment von Lossberg Alt (Old) ==
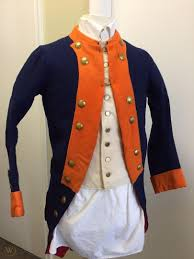
Von Lossberg Regiment

The Regiment von Lossberg was created in 1683 and was headquartered in Rinteln, a small town on the Weser River, between Hameln and Minden in the County of Schaumburg. The largest part of Schaumburg, including Rinteln, became part of Hesse-Cassel at the Treaty of Westphalia in 1648. The regiment was first known as the Regiment Schaumburg and fought against Louis XIV in the Spanish Netherlands between 1693 and 1697. It also fought against the French in the War of the Spanish Succession, distinguishing itself at Oudenarde in 1708 and at Malplaquet in 1709. The regiment also fought during the War of the Polish Succession and the War of the Austrian Succession where it distinguished itself at the defense of Bergen op Zoom. It was also fought at the Battle of Hastenbeck near Hameln during the Seven Years' War, where it supported the British and the Hanoverian armies.

The regiment took its name prior to serving in North America from its commander Lieutenant General Anton Heinrich August von Lossberg, the older brother of Friedrich Wilhelm, as was the practice at that time. Friederich Wilhelm von Lossberg never personally commanded the regiment in North America, since he was detached for brigade command before departing Germany and moved continually higher in the Hessian command structure; first becoming a major general (1779) and then a lieutenant general (1780) and commander of all German forces serving in North America in 1782.

Friedrich Wilhelm von Lossberg did become the commander of the Von Lossberg Regiment Jung (Young) in 1780. This regiment, not to be confused with the Von Lossberg Regiment Alt (Old), was made up of the Mirbach Regiment, renamed in 1780.

== American service ==
=== Mobilization ===
The strength of the Von Lossberg Regiment at the end of 1775 was 437 men, including 21 officers and 60 non-commissioned officers. The uniform of the regiment was distinguished from other Hessian regiments as the facing color of the coat was scarlet as was its cuffs. In North America the regiment consisted of five companies, all armed with muskets. The companies served as a single unit, rather than in two battalions as they had in Europe.

The Fusilier Regiment von Lossberg, departed from Rinteln on 10 March 1776. It first sailed to Portsmouth where it joined a British convoy and arrived in Sandy Hook, New York in October 1776.

While Von Lossberg accompanied the regiment to America, he did not command it, as he was at the time commander of the Leib-Infanterie-Regiment, that also sailed in the same convoy. The regiment with Heinrich Anton von Heringen in command, left Rinteln on 10 March 1776 for the 120 mile march to the port of Lehe (today Bremerhaven) for embarkation. The Von Lossberg Regiment was reported to have had the most deserters during the march, with a loss of 15 men. Heringen in being ordered by Heister to determine the cause reported that it was due to the existence of a rumor of a free pardon in Schaumberg, where Rinteln was located. Most of these men were married and felt that they were therefore exempt from foreign service.

On 7 April the regiment reached the staging area for embarkation and the oath of loyalty to the crown of England was administered. The regiment embarked on 13 April and a fleet of fifty-four vessels, including four carrying the Regiment Von Lossberg, set sail on 17 April 1776. The ships met a larger British fleet at Spithead off the Isle of Wight on 26 April and the entire fleet of 150 ships sailed for North America on 6 May.

=== New York ===
Von Lossberg landed in New York on 12 August 1776, together with the Regiment von Lossberg and the First Division under the overall command of Heister. The Second Division, in which von Lossberg was made a brigade commander, landed in Sandy Hook in October 1776. Von Lossberg and the Second Division were put into the lines for the Battle of White Plains on 28 October, the attack on Fort Washington on Manhattan Island and Fort Lee across the Hudson in New Jersey, although von Lossberg was not present at the battle of Fort Lee.

=== Newport ===
Lord Howe, the Commander of the British forces in North America, ordered the occupation of Newport on Rhode Island to secure a seaport; after the loss of Boston, Narragansett Bay, being recognized as one of the best anchorage for a fleet on the coast. As a result, British and Hessian troops under General Sir Henry Clinton landed at Newport on 8 December 1776, securing the town and nearby Conanicut Island. Among the Hessian contingent was Colonel von Lossberg. The Von Lossberg Regiment was at that time settling into winter quarters in Trenton. On arrival at Newport, von Lossberg, while still a colonel, was given the command of a brigade consisting of the Von Ditfurth Regiment, DuCorps Leib Regiment and Prinz Carl Musketeer Regiment. He was promoted to major general on 24 May 1777 and assumed command of all Hessian troops in Newport and on Rhode Island.

=== Trenton ===
Although Friedrich Wilhelm Von Lossberg was not in attendance at the battle, being at the time posted as a brigade commander in Newport, The Regiment Von Lossberg played a prominent role at the Battle of Trenton.

=== Newport, 1778 ===
In early May 1778 von Lossberg moved to the northern end of Rhode Island with 1,000 men from the Landgrave and Von Ditfurth regiments. Newport had a garrison of 6,000 men, which George Washington hoped to capture. For this a force of 11,000 Americas under Major General John Sullivan were to coordinate an operation with the French Vice Admiral Count d'Estaing. On 9 August Sullivan landed his troops at Howland's Ferry and began to march on Newport, anticipating that French troops landed by D'Estaing would join him. At that time a British fleet under Admiral Richard Howe appeared. D'Estaing reembarked the French troops and sailed away to meet the British further out at sea. This frustrated Sullivan's advance and he decided to wait for the French to return. This they were prevented from doing due to a violent storm on 12–13 August, which then forced D'Estaing to sail to Boston to repair his damaged ships. This led Sullivan to decide to evacuate his troops from Rhode Island.

=== Battle of Rhode Island ===
On the morning of 28 August, the American war council decided to withdraw the last troops from their siege camps. They had engaged the British with occasional rounds of cannon fire for a few days, as some of their equipment was being withdrawn. Deserters had made General Robert Pigot aware of the American plans to withdraw on 26 August, so he was prepared to respond when they withdrew that night.

The American generals established a defensive line across the entire island just south of a valley that cut across the island, hoping to deny the British the high ground in the north. They organized their forces in two sections. On the west, General Nathanael Greene concentrated his forces in front of Turkey Hill but sent the 1st Rhode Island Regiment to establish advanced positions a half mile (1 km) south under the command of Brigadier General James Varnum. On the east, Brigadier General John Glover concentrated his forces behind a stone wall overlooking Quaker Hill.

The British organized their attack in a corresponding way, sending von Lossberg up the west road and Major General Francis Smith up the east road with two regiments each, under orders not to make a general attack. As it turned out, this advance led to the main battle.

Smith's advance stalled when it came under fire from troops commanded by Lt. Col. Henry Brockholst Livingston, who was stationed at a windmill near Quaker Hill. Pigot sent word to the commander of the British reserve, Major General Richard Prescott to dispatch the 54th Regiment and Browne's Provincial Regiment to reinforce Smith. Thus reinforced, Smith returned to the attack, sending the 22nd and 43rd regiments and the flank companies of the 38th and 54th regiments against Livingston's left flank. Livingston had also been reinforced with Col. Edward Wigglesworth's regiment, sent by Sullivan, but was nevertheless driven back to Quaker Hill. Then, with a German regiment threatening to outflank Quaker Hill itself, Livingston and Wigglesworth abandoned the hill and retreated all the way to Glover's lines. Smith made a probing attack but was repulsed by Glover's troops. "Seeing the strength of the American position, Smith decided against launching a major assault". This ended the fighting on the American left.

On the American right, by 7:30 a.m. Von Lossberg had advanced against the American Light Corps under Col. John Laurens, who were positioned behind some stone walls south of the Redwood House. Von Lossberg pushed Laurens' men back onto Turkey Hill with the Hessian chasseurs, Huyne's Hessian regiment, and Fanning's Provincial Regiment. Laurens had been reinforced by a regiment sent by Sullivan, but von Lossberg stormed Turkey Hill and drove the defenders back on Nathanael Greene's wing of the army before starting a cannonade of Greene's lines.

By 10 a.m., the sixth-rate HMS Sphynx, the converted merchantman HMS Vigilant, and the row galley HMS Spitfire had negotiated the passage between Rhode Island (Aquidneck) and Prudence Island and commenced a bombardment of Greene's troops on the American right flank. Von Lossberg now attacked Greene. German troops assailed Major Samuel Ward's Rhode Island Colored Regiment but were repulsed, so they bayoneted the American wounded as they fell back. Meanwhile, Greene's artillery and the American battery at Bristol Neck concentrated their fire on the three British ships and drove them off.

At 2 p.m., von Lossberg once again attacked Greene's positions without success. Greene counterattacked with Col. Israel Angell's 2nd Rhode Island Regiment, Brigadier General Solomon Lovell's brigade of Massachusetts militia, and Livingston's troops. Failing in a frontal attack, Greene sent his 1,500 men forward to try to turn von Lossberg's right flank. Heavily outnumbered, von Lossberg withdrew to the summit of Turkey Hill. By 3 p.m., Greene's wing was holding a stone wall three hundred paces from the foot of Turkey Hill. Towards evening, an attempt was made to cut off the Hessians on von Lossberg's left flank, but Huyne's Hessians and Fanning's Provincials drove off Greene's men. This ended the battle, although some artillery fire went on through the night. The British suffered 260 casualties, of whom 128 were German.

At the conclusion of the battle von Lossberg wrote to his superiors: "During the retreat of the rebels and our pursuit, we lost altogether 231 men including English, Hessian and Ansbach troops, comprising dead, wounded, captured and missing personnel." He added: " Sullivan [General] in his report to Congress made a lot of noise about having annihilated us so we left more than 1,000 men on the battlefield... All men are liars-this man is no exception."

All British and Hessian troops were fully evacuated from Newport by 25 October 1779. Von Lossberg returned to New York under the command of von Knyphausen, then commanding all Hessian troops in North America after replacing Heister on 24 June 1777. Von Lossberg was promoted to lieutenant general on 7 March 1781.

== Commander of the Hessian Forces in North America ==
With the departure of Lieutenant General von Knyphausen on 15 May 1782, together with Lieutenant General Sir Henry Clinton, von Lossberg became the commander of the Hessian troops in North America while Lieutenant General Sir Guy Carleton became overall commander of the British Allied Forces.

Generals Clinton and von Knyphausen departed to England on board the frigate HMS Pearl.

In his role von Lossberg was responsible for the repatriation of the Hessian troops remaining in America. Both Congress and the British Government offered German soldiers land if they remained in America or in Nova Scotia, and about 1/4th of the men accepted.

On 15 September 1783 von Lossberg's men of the Prince Friedrich, Von Knyphausen, Bose, Ditfurth, D'Angelelli, Knoblauch, Benning and Von Buenau regiments under Major General von Kospoth and Major Generals von Knoblauch and von Bischhausen, departed America to return to Germany. The other German troops had begun their return voyage from Halifax and Quebec from the first of that month.

Von Lossberg himself left New York on 16 November 1783 and arrived in Portsmouth aboard the transport ship Duchess of Gordon on 26 December 1783. He returned to Hesse and died at Hesse-Nassau on 25 June 1800.

== Correspondence with George Washington ==
In July 1782, after the surrender of British forces at the Battle of Yorktown the previous October, von Lossberg wrote to George Washington asking for help in obtaining documentation that would enable the passage of supplies to assist Hessian prisoners of war within the city of Philadelphia. Von Lossberg said in his letter that, "this indulgence will in all human probability save the Lives of many Men".

Washington wrote back, and although he expressed concern that there had been, "many abuses", that had been, "practiced under Cover of passports granted for the relief & Support of the prisoners of War", nevertheless issued von Lossberg a passport specifically intended for, "Money ready made Cloathing & Medicine", intended, "for the Use of your prisoners in Phila—".
