= Albert Borgard =

Danish and British general

Albert Borgard (Danish: Albrecht Borgaard or Borregaard; 10 November 1659 – 7 February 1751) was a Danish artillery and engineer officer.

== Early career ==
Albert Borgard was born in Holbæk, Jutland, on 10 November 1659 of unknown parents. He is generally referred to as Albert Borgard in English and Albrecht Borgaard or Borregaard in Danish. He joined the Danish army in 1675, during the war between Sweden and Denmark, and was made a gunner in 1676. He served throughout the war, and at its close, in 1679, held the rank of fireworker, and was ordered to make a survey of the island of Zealand. "In 1680," he wrote, "I, with another fireworker, was ordered to Berlin, in exchange of two Brandenburgher fireworkers, sent to Denmark to learn the difference of each nation's works, relating to all sorts of warlike and pleasant fireworks". He served at the relief of Vienna, at the battle of Gran, Hungary (1685), and the siege of Buda. In 1688 he left the Danish service, on account of "some injustice done him in his promotion", and went to Poland as a volunteer; but he was offered a commission in the Prussian Guards, which he accepted. In the Prussian army he served upon the Rhine, and at the siege of Bonn. In 1692 he left the Prussian army, with a commission to raise a regiment for the emperor; but failing in this design, he went in April to the camp of Louis XIV before Namur. He distinguished himself in the attack on the fortress; and the French king ordered him 1,000 crowns, and offered him a captain's commission. But Borgard, a sturdy Protestant, refused the tempting offer, and joined Colonel Gore, whose acquaintance he had made at Bonn, as a volunteer.

== Family ==
Borgard first married in 1703 Barbara Bradshaw (d. 1714); they had several children including George (baptised 1704) and Albert (baptised 30 May 1706 at St Dunstan, Stepney).

His second wife was Catherine [Cathrine/Catharine)], daughter of Georg Mikkelsen (d. 1665), merchant and head of the Danish church in London. Their children included Thomas Michael (bap. 1717), Catharine (bap. 17 September 1717), Mary (bap. 1724), Katharine Ambrosia (bap. 30 December 1727), Frederick (bap. 1728) and Elizabeth (bap. 1730).

Mary Borgard married James Pattison, Royal Artillery officer. They had one son, Nathaniel, who died as an infant.

Albert Borgard died at Woolwich, where he was living, on 7 February 1751 and was buried in the Danish church in Marine [Wellclose] Square, near the Tower of London.

== British service ==
Though but thirty-three years of age when he joined the English army, he had been present at eleven battles and twelve sieges, and was one of the most experienced artillery and engineer officers in the world. Gore introduced him to William III, who saw his ability, and made him a firemaster in the English service in 1693, and captain and adjutant of the artillery in Flanders in 1695. He was present at the battles of Steenkirk and Landen and the sieges of Huy and Namur. When at the peace of 1697 all the foreign artillerymen in English pay were dismissed, he, with only one other officer named Schlunt, was taken to England, and in 1698 made an engineer by William III's special command. In 1702 he helped to take Forts Ste.-Catherine, Matagorda, and Durand. On his return to England he married Barbara Bradshaw, by whom he had several children. After serving in Flanders he was gazetted lieutenant-colonel of artillery, and sent to command the artillery in Spain and Portugal in the army of Lord Galway. He took Valencia de Alcántara, Ciudad Rodrigo, and Alcántara, and made Galway's advance into Spain justifiable from a purely military point of view. In 1708 he superintended the reduction of the castle of San Felipe in Minorca. He was present with Stanhope at the battles of Almanza, Almanara, Saragossa, where he was wounded in four places, and at Villa Viciosa, where he was wounded, left for dead, and taken prisoner. On being exchanged he returned to England, and was appointed chief firemaster on 9 August 1712. In 1713 he made use of some of his old Berlin lessons in "pleasant fireworks", and, to quote his own words, "made pleasure fireworks which were burnt on the River Thames in the month of August over against Whitehall on the Thanksgiving-day for the peace made at Utrecht". In 1715 he commanded the train of artillery sent to the Duke of Argyll in Scotland, in 1718 he was made assistant-surveyor of ordnance, and in 1719 commanded the artillery in the expedition to Vigo. This was Colonel Borgard's last piece of active service; but his greatest service of all was the formation of the Regiment of Royal Artillery.

== Royal Artillery ==
In his own account of his services Borgard says: "In 1722 his late Majesty was graciously pleased to renew my old commission as colonel, and to give me the command of the regiment of artillery, established for his service, consisting of four companies." His honourable behaviour as colonel-commandant is noted in a letter of his nephew, Major-General Albert Borgard Michelsen: "He was strictly honest, and declared often, and shortly before he died, that he could safely affirm it upon oath that he had never made 6 pence out of his regiment above what the king allowed, and gave up the cloathing of the regiment to the Board of Ordnance, that he might not be suspected to have any profit of it... He was in great favour with Prince George of Denmark, and with King George the 1st and 2nd" (Olsen). Borgard was promoted major-general in 1735, and lieutenant-general in 1739. When he died at Woolwich, on 7 February 1751, at the great age of ninety-two, he left to his successor, General Belford, one of the finest corps of artillery in the world.
