= Samuel Birch (British Army officer) =

British Army officer (1721–1811)

Major-General Samuel Birch
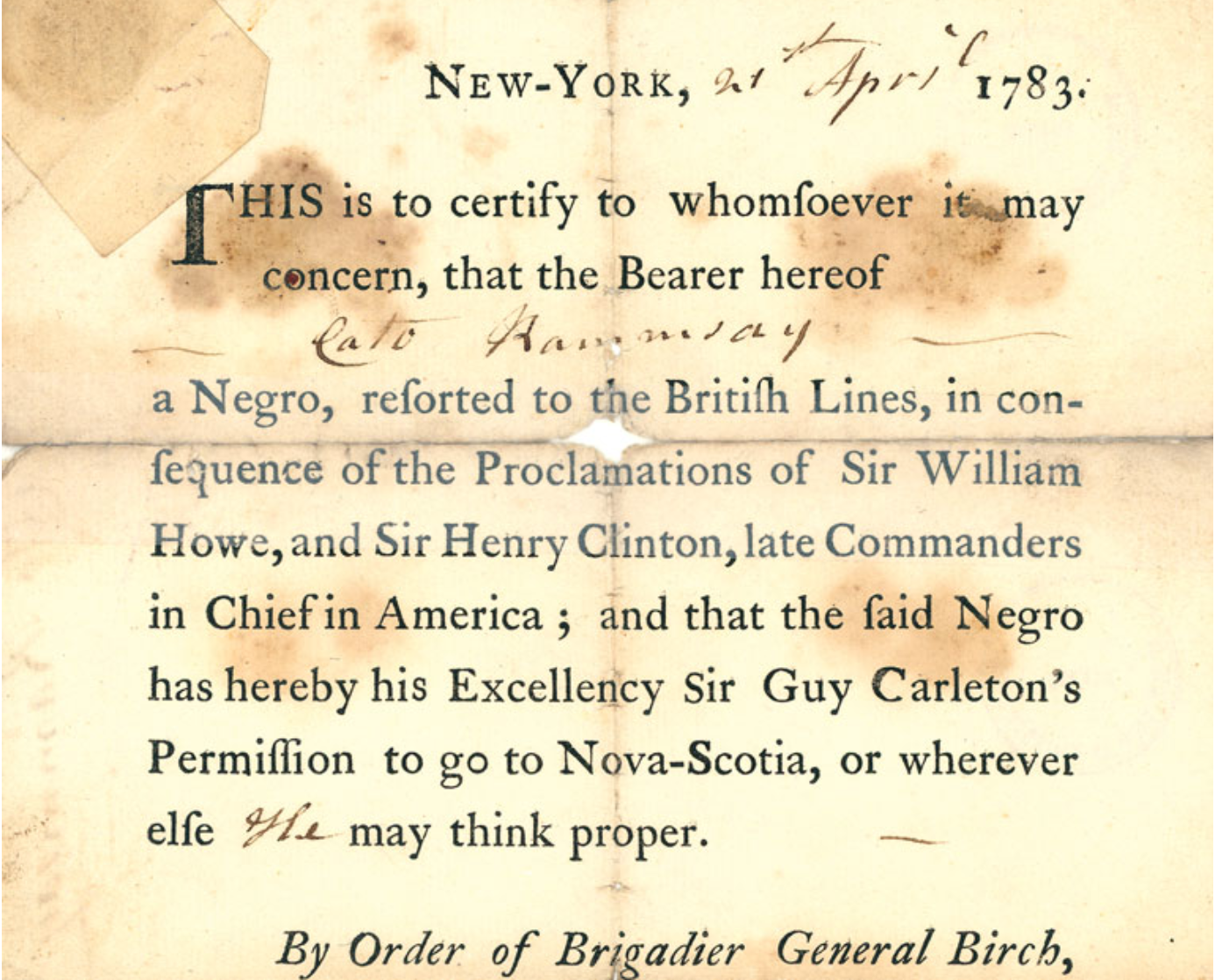
- Certificate of Freedom (Birch Certificate), (only 5 certificates remain of the 3500 issued)
- Born: 21 February 1721; Gorton, England
- Died: 1811 (aged 89–90); London, England
- Burial place: Ardwick
- Relatives: John Birch (great great uncle)
- Military career
- Allegiance: Great Britain; United Kingdom
- Branch: British Army
- Rank: Major-General
- Commands: 17th Regiment of (Light) Dragoons; Commandant of New York City
- Conflicts: Seven Years' War; American Revolution; Battle of Bunker Hill; Battle of Long Island; Battle of White Plains; Battle of Fort Washington; Battle of Forts Clinton and Montgomery; Battle of Crooked Billet; Battle of Barren Hill; Battle of Monmouth

Major-General Samuel Birch (21 February 1735 – 1811) was a British Army officer who served as the commandant of New York City during the American Revolution. He helped free and shelter thousands of slaves as recorded in the Book of Negroes. Birch was the commander of the 17th Regiment of (Light) Dragoons, the only British cavalry regiment in North America. He participated in most of the significant engagements in the north. He is known for leading the failed attempt to kidnap George Washington.

== Career ==
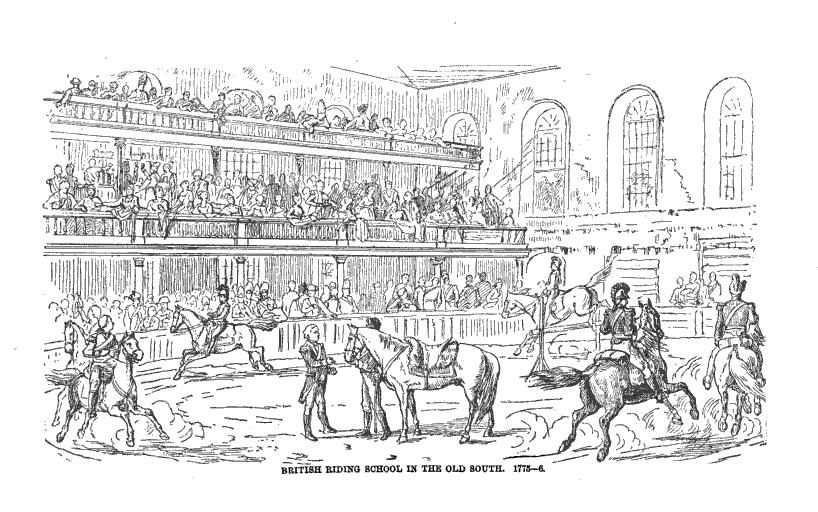
Birch leading the 17th Dragoons in the Old South Meeting House, Boston

Birch initially served in the 11th Dragoons during the Seven Years' War. Under the command of John Hale, Birch served as Captain in the newly formed 17th Regiment of (Light) Dragoons in 1759. The regiment was stationed in Scotland for three years. In 1771, as Major Birch, he fell under the command of George Preston. On 24 April 1773 he became commissioned as a Lieut. Colonel. After the war, the regiment was stationed in Ireland for 11 years.

The regiment was sent to North America in 1775, arriving in Boston, then besieged by American rebels in the American Revolutionary War. Birch fought in the Battle of Bunker Hill, a costly British victory, in June 1775. On 27 October 1775, Birch and his regiment famously rode their horses to disrupt the gatherings of patriots in Boston’s Old South Meeting House. The regiment was part of the evacuation of Boston in 1776 and was withdrawn to Halifax for two months.

In June 1776, Birch was given command of the regiment and arrived at Staten Island, attached to the Highland Brigade under Brigadier-General Sir William Erskine. He fought at the Battle of Long Island in August 1776 at the Battle of White Plains in October 1776 and at the Battle of Fort Washington in November 1776. It was in action again at the Battle of Forts Clinton and Montgomery in October 1777, the Battle of Crooked Billet in May 1778 and the Battle of Barren Hill later that month. He then led the 2nd Division in the Battle of Monmouth.

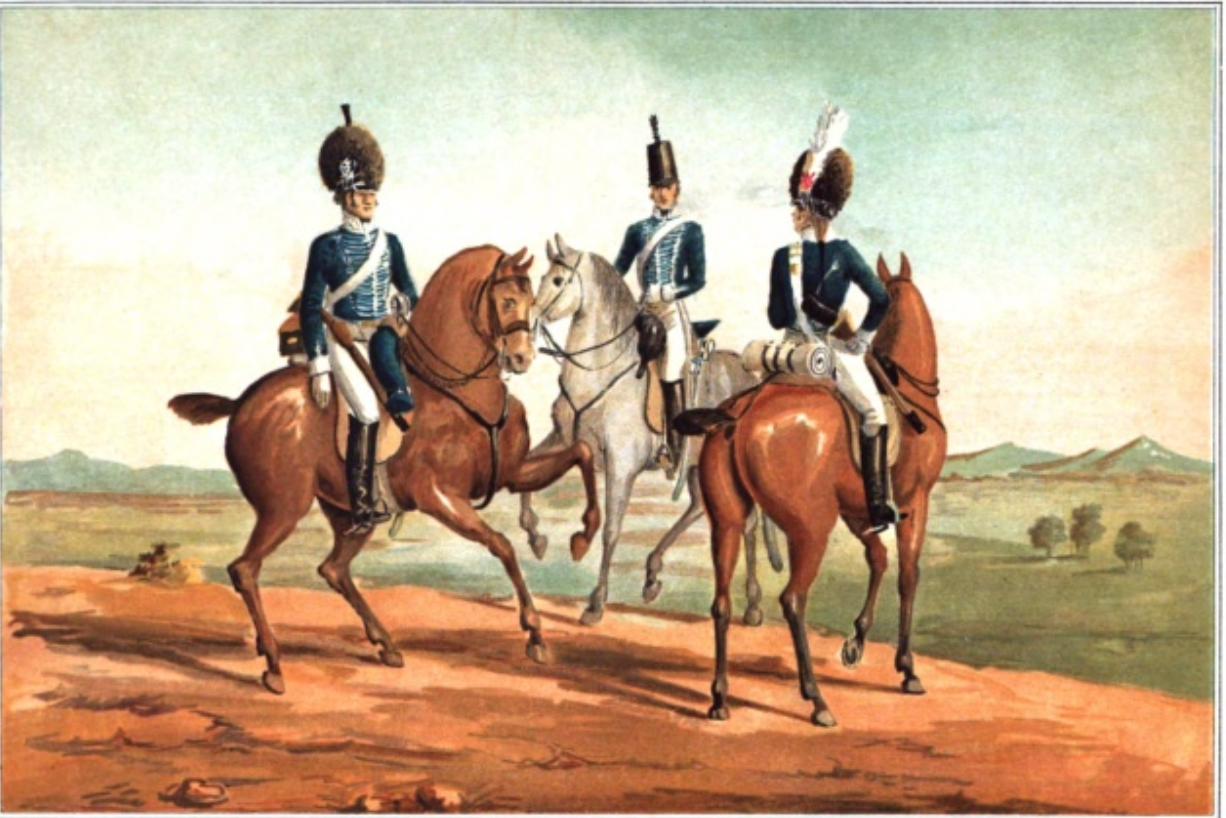
17th Regiment of (Light) Dragoons (17th Lancers) (1784–1810)

In 1780, serving under the command of Colonel George Preston, Birch became commandant of New York City.

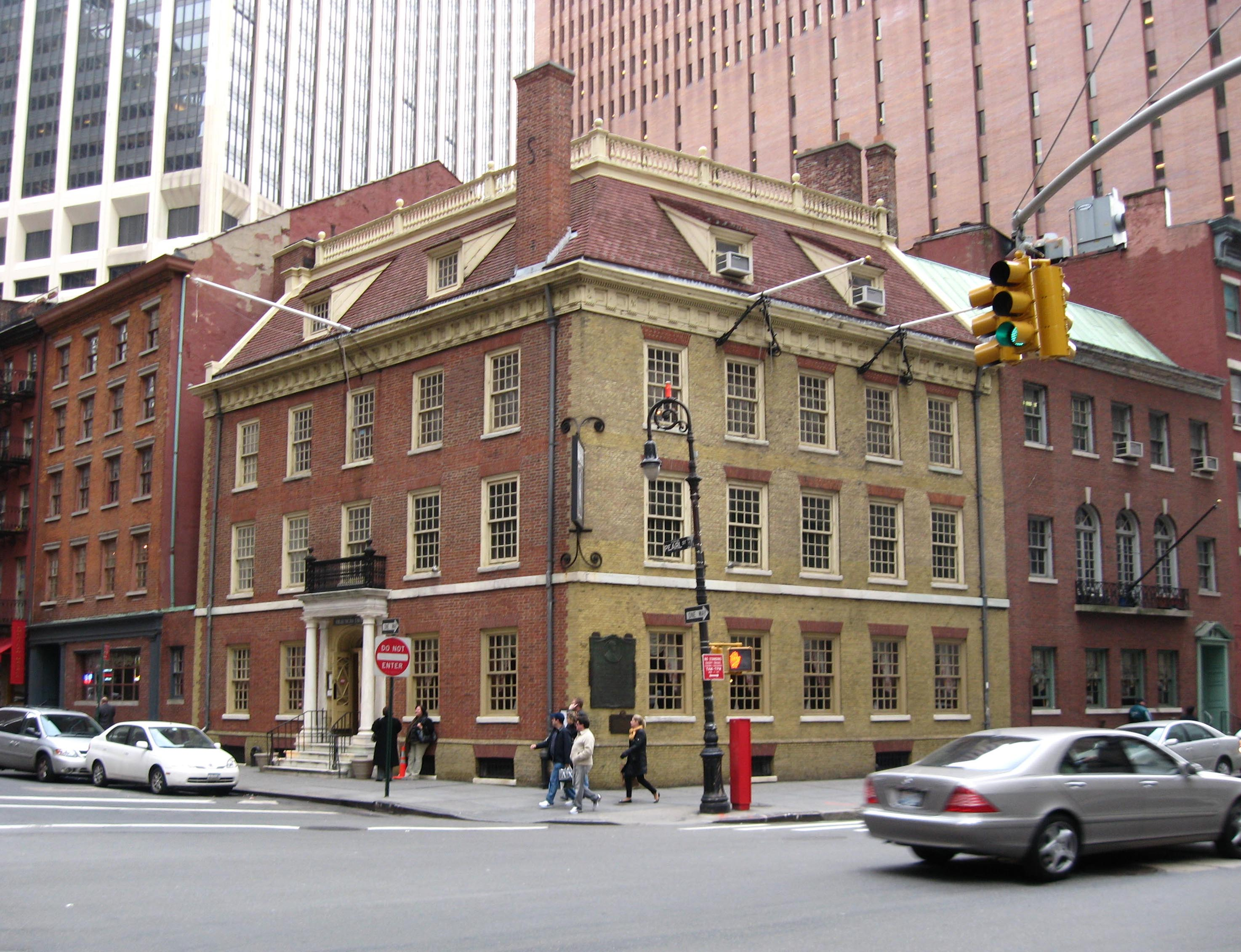
Fraunces Tavern, NYC – Location where Birch assembled the Book of Negroes

General Guy Carleton appointed Birch to determine which Blacks had earned their freedom as Loyalist soldiers. These meetings became known as "The Birch Trials" and they happened at Fraunces Tavern, NYC every Wednesday from April to November of 1783. Its members judged each black on the testimony that he/she offered as evidence of loyal service. There were 3,500 freed slaves.

On August 21, 1783, Birch left New York. (General Thomas Musgrave would sign his name to more than 340 additional emancipation certificates before the last Black Loyalist had set sail for Nova Scotia on November 30, 1783.) After the war, the regiment returned to Ireland (1784). They were under the command of Thomas Gage (1783–1784).

He remained in the 17th Regiment as a Lieutenant Col. in 1785 – 1793 under Col. Thomas, Earl of Lincoln. The Regiment was posted to Jamaica and he became a Major General (1790). For his last year with the regiment, 1794, he was under the command of Col Thomas, Duke of Newcastle. He was the last surviving soldier of those who had originally established the regiment 35 years earlier (1759–1794).

== Family ==
Birch's great grandfather was Major Samuel Birch and his great, great uncle was Col. John Birch.

Birch was the son of Samuel Birch (1690–1757) of Lower Ardwick and Elizabeth Hill (1704–1782) of Manchester. Samuel Sr. was a High Sheriff of Lancashire he also donated the site for the St. Thomas Chapel, Ardwick (1740) (present-day St. Thomas Centre). Birch was baptised at Gorton Chapel (1735). His father's will left the manors of Upper and Lower Ardwick to his son Thomas, who then willed them to his brother Samuel. Samuel owned them for 15 years (1780–1795). In 1795, Birch sold his properties to William Horridge, which was legally contested (Watson v. Birch). (Note: Samuel Birch of Ardwick. Baptised April 30, 1730; brother Thomas died 1781. Both brothers died issueless.) With the sale of these properties and the lack of hiers, one commentator wrote,

"And so the story of the vicissitudes of the ancient owners of the lands of Ardwick closes. The old family of the Birches seem to have quite disappeared from the seat and scene of their past prosperity. Captains and major-generals and high-sheriffs, men of a renown larger than their own lands, wider than the great country wherein they formerly flourished! "Sic transit gloria mundi."

The sale of the estates in 1795 is that last known record of Birch other than that he died January 1811 at age 76, without marrying or having children. He lived the last fifteen years of his life in Ludgate Hill, London, but the location of his gravestone is unknown.

== Legacy ==
- Birch is the namesake of Birchtown, Nova Scotia and Birchtown, Guysborough County, Nova Scotia
- Namesake of Birch Street, Digby, Nova Scotia

== See also ==
- Black Nova Scotians

== Links ==
- Proclamations by Samuel Birch (1780–1781)
