= 1st Virginia State Regiment =

- Active: December 1776 – c. 1779
- Allegiance: Commonwealth of Virginia
- Branch: Infantry
- Type: Regular state troops
- Role: Line infantry
- Size: 10 companies
- Engagements: Philadelphia campaign: Valley Forge (encampment); Battle of Monmouth

Commanders
- Notable commanders: George Gibson

The 1st Virginia State Regiment was a regiment of regular state troops raised by the Commonwealth of Virginia during the American Revolutionary War.

== Formation ==
The regiment was authorized by the Virginia General Assembly in December 1776 as part of the Commonwealth's regular military establishment. It was organized as a ten-company infantry regiment for the defense of Virginia and for service in support of the Continental Army when required.

== Continental Army service ==
In 1777, due to Virginia's difficulty meeting its Continental Army quota, the regiment was ordered north and placed in Continental service under Colonel George Gibson.

The regiment participated in the Philadelphia campaign and encamped with the Continental Army at Valley Forge during the winter of 1777–1778. It later fought in the Battle of Monmouth in June 1778 and wintered at the Middlebrook encampment during 1778–1779.

== Organization and command ==
The regiment was organized as a ten-company infantry formation, including a light infantry company, unlike most Virginia Continental Line regiments, which generally consisted of eight companies.

=== Field officers ===
- Colonel George Gibson
- Lieutenant Colonel William Brent
- Lieutenant Colonel John Allison (promoted from major in 1778)
- Major Thomas Meriwether (formerly a company commander)

=== Company officers ===
Surviving records list the following company commanders during Continental Army service (incomplete):

- Captain Thomas Pollard
- Captain William Hoffler
- Captain Thomas Ewell
- Captain Windsor Brown
- Captain John Nicholas
- Captain William Payne
- Captain John Lee
- Captain John Camp
- Captain Abner Crump
- Captain Thomas Hamilton
- Captain Robert Daniel Brown
- Captain Thomas Smith

The full sequence of company-level command over time is incompletely documented in surviving records.

== Post-Continental service and later history ==
The regiment returned to Virginia service in 1779.

After this point, surviving Virginia military and payroll records no longer consistently identify the unit as a single cohesive formation. Officers associated with the regiment continued to appear in Virginia service records, typically in company- or district-level assignments following the broader reorganization of Virginia's forces.

The subsequent administrative status of the regiment is unclear. No surviving primary source documents either a formal disbandment or continued service as a unified formation after 1779.

== Bibliography ==
- Flagg, C. A.; Waters, W. O. (1913). "Virginia Soldiers in the Revolution". The Virginia Magazine of History and Biography. 21 (4): 337–346.
- Hening, William Waller (1821). The Statutes at Large; Being a Collection of All the Laws of Virginia. Vol. 9. Richmond: J. & G. Cochran.
- Revolutionary War Rolls, 1775–1783. National Archives Microfilm Publication M246. Vol. Rolls 93–94. National Archives.
- Shelby, John E. (1988). The Revolution in Virginia, 1775–1783. Charlottesville: University Press of Virginia.
- Wright, Robert K. Jr. (1983). The Continental Army. Army Lineage Series. Washington, D.C.: Center of Military History, United States Army.
