= James Pattison (British Army officer) =

British Army general (1723–1805)

James Pattison (1723–1805) was a distinguished officer in the Royal Artillery who made important contributions inter alia at the Battle of Fontenoy, in the American War of Independence, and as military commandant of New York City. He had been Chief Firemaster at Woolwich and ended his career as Colonel Commanding, Royal Artillery.

== Family ==
James Pattison was born in 1723, the second of three sons of James Pattison, a merchant, and Mary Maxey. His two siblings, Nathaniel (c. 1714–1784) and Samuel (1726–1756), went on to play important roles in the silk industry in Cheshire, especially in Congleton.

James married Mary, daughter of Albert Borgard, the man of Danish origin who was instrumental in the establishment of the Royal Regiment of Artillery. Mary was baptised in 1724 and was buried at St. Nicholas, Plumstead, Kent on 1 July 1792, aged 72. They had a son Nathaniel, born on 8 February 1754 in Perth, Scotland. He died the following year and was also buried at St. Nicholas on 9 December 1755. General Pattison died on 1 March 1805, at his house in Hill Street, Berkeley Square. He was buried on the 9th with his family in Plumstead.

== Promotions and other positions held in the Royal Artillery ==
Rank	Date
Colonel Commandant	25 Apr 1777
Chief Firemaster	1746–1748
General	26 Jan 1797
Lieutenant General	28 Sep 1787
Major General	19 Feb 1779
Colonel	29 Sep 1775
Lieutenant Colonel	23 Oct 1761
Major	1 Jan 1759
Captain	1 Aug 1747
Captain Lieutenant	1 Sep 1743
1st Lieutenant	2 Apr 1742
2nd Lieutenant	1 Sep 1741
Lieut. Fireworker	1 Apr 1740

Pattison was appointed the first lieutenant-governor of the Royal Military Academy in 1764, and was given a free hand to make changes to the regime of the academy as he saw fit. He "entered on his new duties with great zeal" and introduced a complete set of new rules and regulations.

== Military Assignments ==
=== Flanders and Portugal ===
Pattison “served with distinction in Flanders (Battle of Fontenoy); later, at the end of the Seven Years' War, he was chosen to command the companies selected for service in Portugal." His detachment in 1762 consisted of eight artillery companies. When so employed, he won the respect of all by his dignified firmness and courtesy, and laid the foundation of an affection towards himself from the officers serving under him which never even waned.” Lieutenant Stephen Payne Adye (1743-1794) was on Pattison's staff in Portugal and later, as Captain-Lieutenant, was aide-de-camp to General Pattison in New York (see below). He had three sons, the third of whom was born in 1783 and named James Pattison Adye, presumably as a token of respect for the General.

=== Venice ===
In 1769 Colonel Pattison was sent to Venice to superintend the organisation of the Venetian Artillery, where his task was made difficult not so much by the Artillerymen but by the authorities. He remained until 1772.

=== America ===
In 1777 James Pattison became colonel commandant of the 4th Battalion, Royal Regiment of Artillery. He arrived in New York to take command of the Royal Artillery in America with the rank of brigadier-general. He was involved in the capture of Verplanck's Point and of Forts Clinton and Montgomery on the Hudson River in October 1777. Pattison remained in command of the artillery in the field until Sir Henry Clinton, the British Commander-in-Chief, withdrew the army to New York the following year.

Amongst Pattison's duties in New York was his appointment as military commandant of the city, making him responsible for its fortifications and the militia. He lived at No. 1 Broadway, on Bowling Green. The house had been occupied first by Sir Henry Clinton and then - immediately before Pattison - by General Robertson, also Commandant of New York.

In September 1780, James Pattison returned to England because of ill health and did not return to active service. He twice served as Commandant of the Woolwich Garrison.

== Artistic Interests ==
During his time in Venice Pattison became interested in pictures. Letters to his brother show that he knew Consul Smith and Sir James Wright and that, with them, he was one of the few admitted to the circle of the self-exiled Lord Bute.

The sale of the contents of Pattison's house on Hill Street was handled by Christie's on 24 May 1805. Included were a number of Venetian paintings, with works by Bellini, Titian, Bassano, and five by Gaudi.

General Pattison sat "for one of the more remarkable of Lawrence's early portraits, exhibited at the Royal Academy in 1790."
