= Heinrich Julius von Kospoth =

Hessian Major General (1724–1801)

Count Heinrich Julius von Kospoth (8 March 1724 – 28 February, 1801) was a Hessian major general who served in the American Revolutionary War. He was first colonel of the Musketeer Regiment Wutgenau and later as a major general, commanded the First Hessian Division; consisting of the regiments Knyphausen, Ditfurth, Prince Frederick, Bose, Borbeck, Bunau, Benning and Knobloch as well as the Grenadier Battalion Angenelli.

== Early life ==
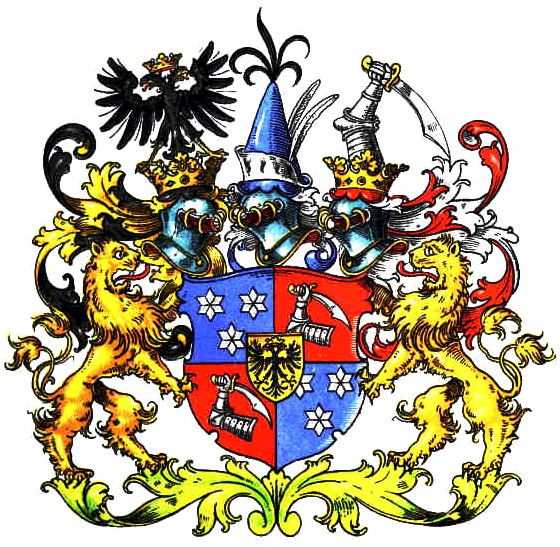
Coat of arms of Counts von Kospoth

Kospoth was born at Schilbach, Tanna, Saale-Orla-Kreis, Thuringia on 8 March 1724, as the son of Johann August von Kospoth (1683-1758) and his wife, Sophie Friederike Amalie von Beulwitz (1691-1733).

By birth, he is the member of an old German noble family from Thuringia that stems from Kospoda near Neustadt an der Orla. On 27 July 1776 the family was raised to the hereditary title of Count in the Kingdom of Prussia by Frederick the Great.

== American Revolutionary War ==
Kospoth was colonel of the Musketeer Regiment Wutgenau (later Landgraf 1777) when it sailed for America. He was promoted to major general in February 1779 at the same time as Generals Friedrich Wilhelm von Lossberg, Carl von Bose and Johann von Huyan. Two of his nephews also served as officers in the Hessian Forces, Friedrich August Carl von Kospoth (1767–1832 Regiments Landgraf and Lengercke) he later served as Mayor of Breslau. and Ludwig von Kospoth (1757–1787 Regiments Landgraf and Lengercke).

=== Siege of Charleston ===
Kospoth served with General Henry Clinton at the siege of Charleston, where the Hessians distinguished themselves by protecting the men digging the parallel trenches for besieging the City. Charleston with 3371 American and French troops was surrendered by General Lincoln on 12 May 1780. General Clinton praised the Hessian Grenadiers and paid them the compliment of wearing white plumes for their bravery and in his report praised in particular, Generals v. Huyne and v. Kospoth. Kospoth with part of the Hessian force left Charleston on 31 May 1780 for New York and went into Quarters on Staaten Island, thereby avoiding the eventual surrender of General Charles Cornwallis at Yorktown on 19 October 1781.

The Hessian Regiments serving at Charleston were the Regiments von Bose, von Linsingen, von Lengerke, von Minnigerode, Köler, von Wissenbach, von Huyn and the Feldjägerkorps.

=== Court-martial into the Trenton "Surprise" ===
The court-martial into the "Surprise" at Trenton was ordered by Frederick II, Landgrave of Hesse-Kassel to investigate the events surrounding the defeat and surrender at Trenton and to punish those found to be responsible. He instructed Lieutenant-General Wilhelm von Knyphausen to convene a court-martial under a major general presiding and three officers on the court of each rank. Major general Heinrich Julius von Kospoth was appointed to be the presiding judge and 3 officers from every rank from colonel through ensign were also appointed.

"You may order such courts-martial to carefully investigate all the circumstances of this affair and after due considerations pass judgment thereon. If any are found guilty according to law you should pass sentence on each one according as your conscience may dictate and send the verdict to me".

The verdict of the court as rendered by Kospoth and Stabsauditeur Lotheisen, after hearing the findings from each of the ranked officers commencing with the junior officers through to the colonels blamed Colonel Johann Rall and Major Dechow for the disaster and acquitting all others, while recommending that the regiments involved at Trenton be given new colors.

On 15 August 1783 Kospoth and his troops sailed from New York, reaching home in October and November. Kospoth returned to Kassel in Hessen, where he died on 26 February 1801.

== Personal life ==
He married Wilhelmina Dorothea Charlotte von Heydwolff. They had one daughter, Countess Henriette von Kospoth (1766-1839), who married Johann Karl Jeremias von Lossberg (1759-1804), the son of Lieutenant general Friedrich Wilhelm von Lossberg. His great-niece Countess Stella von Kospoth (1811-1892) later married Baron Ernst Friedrich Moritz zu Innhausen und Knyphausen (1795-1894).
