= 2nd Virginia State Regiment =

- Active: 1776-1782
- Country: United States
- Allegiance: Commonwealth of Virginia
- Branch: Infantry
- Type: Regular state troops
- Role: Line infantry
- Size: 10 companies
- Engagements: American Revolutionary War

The 2nd Virginia State Regiment was a regiment of regular state troops from Virginia which fought during the American Revolutionary War.

== Formation ==
The regiment was authorized by the General Assembly of the Commonwealth of Virginia in December, 1776 as a force of regular troops for the Commonwealth's defense.

== In the Contintenal Army ==
In January, 1778, with low recruitment to the Virginia line of the Continental Army and in the wake of heavy losses to Virginia regiments at the Battle of Germantown, the 2nd Virginia State Regiment was sent by Governor Patrick Henry (per an act of the General Assembly) to join the Continental Army in the Philadelphia Campaign. By May, 1778, the regiment was in Valley Forge training with the Continental Army. The regiment camped at Middlebrook in the winter of 1778-79 and participated in the Battle of Monmouth. The regiment remained in the service of the Continental Army until late 1779 when called back to Virginia.

== Disbandment ==
In April and May 1780, most of the regiment was discharged. The remaining companies of the Virginia state regiments were organized under Colonel Charles Dabney in the summer of 1781 and were under his command at the siege of Yorktown. It was disbanded in 1782.

== Field Officers ==
- Colonel Gregory Smith
- Colonel William Brent
- Lt. Colonel Charles Dabney
- Major John Lee
- Major Robert B. Bagby

== Company Commanders ==
- Captain Peter Bernard
  - Captain John McElhaney (replaced Capt. Bernard)
- Captain John Lewis
  - Captain Machen Boswell (replaced Capt. Lewis)
- Captain Harry Dudley
- Captain Henry Garnett
  - Captain John Dudley (replaced Capt. Garnett)
  - Captain John Hudson (Replaced Capt. Dudley)
- Captain Thomas Bressie
  - Captain James Moody (replaced Capt. Bressie)
- Captain James Quarles
  - Captain William Long (replaced Capt. Quarles)
- Captain Benjamin Spiller
  - Captain Augustine Tabb (replaced Capt. Spiller)
- Captain William Taliaferro
  - Captain Thomas Minor (replaced Capt. Taliaferro)
  - Captain Nathaniel Welch (replaced Capt. Minor)
