= Pennsylvania Navy =

Two naval forces raised by Pennsylvania

Pennsylvania State Navy
- The ensign of the Pennsylvania State Navy
- Active: 1775–1783
- Country: United Colonies; United States
- Branch: Navy
- Motto: "An Appeal to Heaven"
- Engagements: American Revolutionary War; Philadelphia campaign; Siege of Fort Mifflin; Battle of Red Bank

Commanders
- Notable commanders: Thomas Read; John Hazelwood; Joshua Barney

The Pennsylvania State Navy was the state navy of Pennsylvania during the American Revolutionary War. It was founded on July 6, 1775, and spent most of its existence operating almost exclusively in the Delaware River. The state navy acquired dozens of vessels over the course of the war, many of which were 1-gun row galleys. Its most prominent engagement was the 1777 Philadelphia campaign, during the state navy unsuccessfully attempted to resist advancing British forces before being entirely destroyed. To protect Pennsylvanian merchantmen from British attacks, the state navy raised more ships. On April 10, 1783, the navy was disbanded when its last vessels were sold.

In April 1889, the Naval Force of Pennsylvania was raised by state authorities. By 1894, the United States Navy had started lending warships to serve in the Naval Force of Pennsylvania, which was organized on a battalion level. Ships lent included the protected cruiser USS Chicago, which served from April 26, 1916 to April 1917 and the steamship USS Wolverine which served for 11 years making summer training cruises for the United States Naval Reserve. Under 10 U.S. Code §7851, naval militias form part of the U.S. militia and therefore are considered as such. Any attempt to reactivate a naval militia in Pennsylvania must be done either by the governor of Pennsylvania or the Pennsylvania General Assembly.

== Background ==
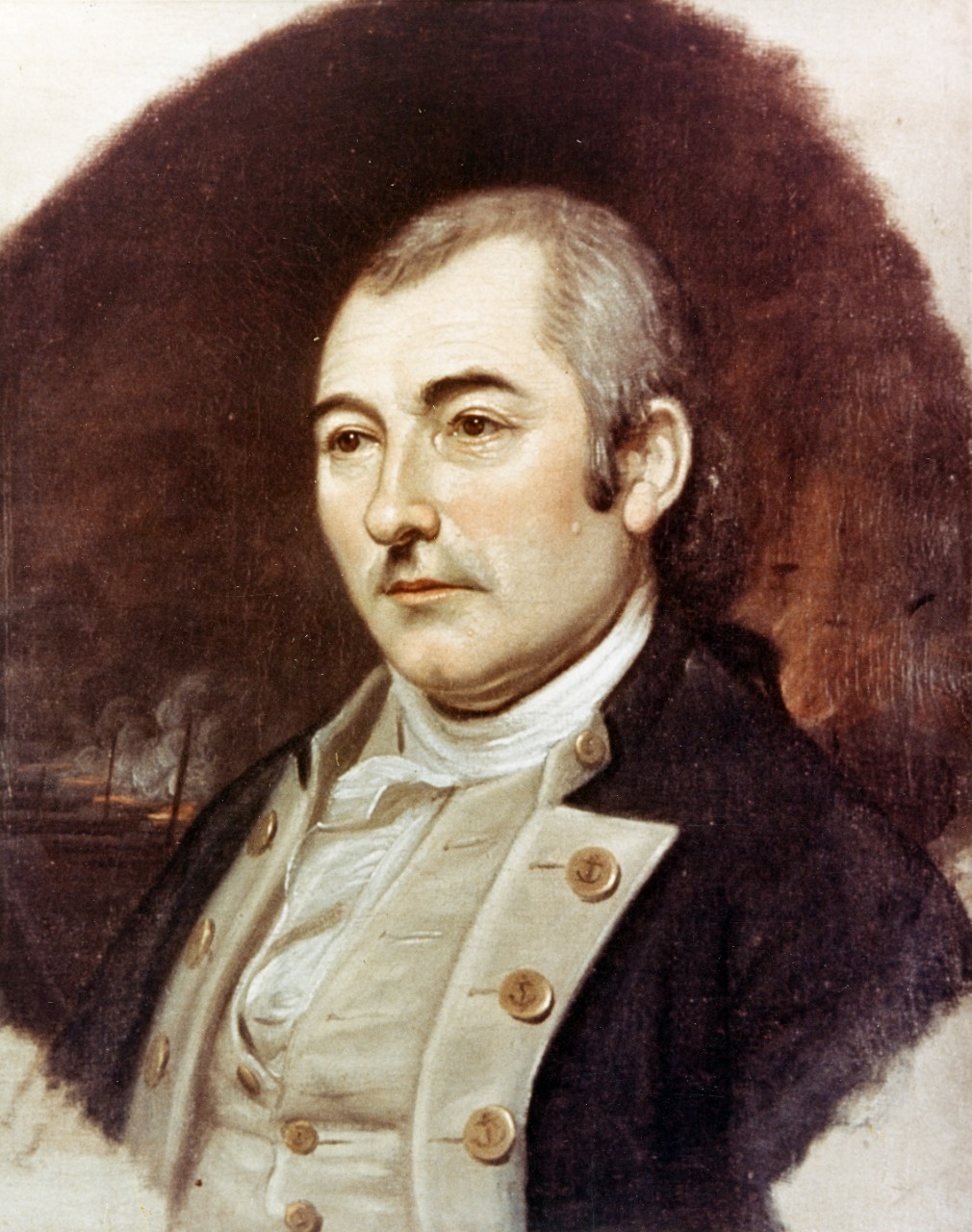
John Hazelwood, who served as commodore of the Pennsylvania State Navy

When the American Revolutionary War broke out in early 1775, the Province of Pennsylvania's Committee of Safety decided that the colony's capital and seat of the Second Continental Congress, Philadelphia, would need to be protected against the incursions of British naval vessels on the Delaware River. On July 6, 1775, it authorized the purchase and outfitting of ships for that purpose. Two days later it placed its first order for an armed galley. By October thirteen such boats had been built at a cost of £550 each, and outfitted with a single cannon in the bow. Thomas Read was appointed commodore of the navy. The first six were launched by July 19, and another six had been launched by the end of August. Their names were: Bulldog, Burke, Camden, Congress, Dickinson, Effingham I, Experiment, Franklin, Hancock, Ranger, and Warren.

Additionally, 10 fire ships were built in late 1775 and early 1776 and placed under the command of Captain John Hazelwood; the Arnold and the Putnam were built as floating batteries and were manned by American colonial marines. In April 1776 the state acquired the Montgomery, which Read served as captain of until he received a Continental Navy commission in October 1776. By the end of August 1776, the Pennsylvania State Navy consisted of 768 men manning 27 vessels, with 21 more smaller vessels on order. These were armed with a four-pounder gun in the bow and were classed as guard boats.

== Administration ==
The navy fell under the broad control of the Committee of Safety, which established subcommittees to manage the navy's operations and acquisitions. When the state established a new constitution, with a Supreme Executive Council as its executive, the navy's administration was assigned to the Council of Safety. In March 1777 the council established a naval board, which had full responsibility for the navy, with the exception of the issuance of officer commissions, which authority the council retained. Overall command of the navy was at times contentious. Thomas Read served as its first commodore, but he was replaced on January 13, 1776, by Thomas Caldwell, who only served briefly, resigning due to poor health in March.

His replacement, Samuel Davidson, was promoted by the committee ahead of other captains, and almost caused a mutiny. As a result, Davidson was first removed from command, and then eventually dismissed from the navy. Command was then given to Thomas Seymour, but Captain Hazelwood objected to serving under the elderly Seymour. When British operations began to threaten Philadelphia in September 1777, the council dismissed Seymour and gave overall command to Hazelwood. In September 1778, the state established an admiralty court to adjudicate maritime cases and deal with the distribution of prizes. While no explicit legislation authorizing privateering appears to have been passed, the state did issue more than 400 letters of marque between 1776 and 1782.

== Service ==
The navy saw action on May 6, 1776, when they engaged the British warships HMS Roebuck and HMS Liverpool, both of which subsequently withdrew to Newcastle, Delaware. The navy also attempted to keep British and Hessian troops away from the river's eastern shore when General George Washington retreated across New Jersey following the loss of New York City. Hazelwood was instrumental in preventing Hessian troops from quartering in Burlington, New Jersey, a town sympathetic to the Loyalist cause, by bombarding it when Hessians were spotted there. This forced their commander, Carl von Donop, to quarter his troops much more widely, and may have contributed to Washington's victory at the Battle of Trenton on December 26, 1776.

The Pennsylvania State Navy was responsible for defense of the Delaware river when Philadelphia was occupied by British troops led by General Sir William Howe in 1777, as the Royal Navy wanted to control the river to resupply Howe's army. At first the combined Pennsylvania and Continental fleet was successful, resisting one attempt by British warships to pass the defenses of Fort Mercer and Fort Mifflin on October 22 and 23, during which the ship of the line HMS Augusta blew up from unknown causes and the sloop-of-war HMS Merlin was scuttled. The American fleet also bombarded von Donop's forces as they attacked Fort Mercer in the Battle of Red Bank, in which the Hessians suffered one of their worst defeats of the war.

In November, the two forts were captured by British troops, and Commodore John Hazelwood's fleet was then forced to withdraw upriver. Unfavorable winds slowed their progress, and four ships, Montgomery, Delaware, Arnold, and Putnam, were burned to prevent their capture. In April 1778 most of the navy's remaining ships were destroyed in advance of expected British operations against it. However, news that the British were going to evacuate Philadelphia led to its resurrection, and in July Hazelwood reported that the brig Convention was ready for action. Its existence as a significant force was limited by the arrival of a French Navy fleet on the North American coast, and in August 1778 the state's assembly voted to sell off most of its remaining ships, keeping only Convention and a few smaller ships.

The smaller ships proved inadequate protection for the trade ships of Pennsylvania's merchants. In response to their petitions, the state authorized the construction of General Greene in March 1779. Under her captain, James Montgomery, she cruised between New York and the Chesapeake Bay, often in conjunction with Continental Navy ships or privateers, and sent a number of prizes to Philadelphia. According to Montgomery, her crew was virtually unmanageable, and she was sold at the end of the 1779 sailing season. Her unusually low sales price aroused suspicions of collusion in the process.

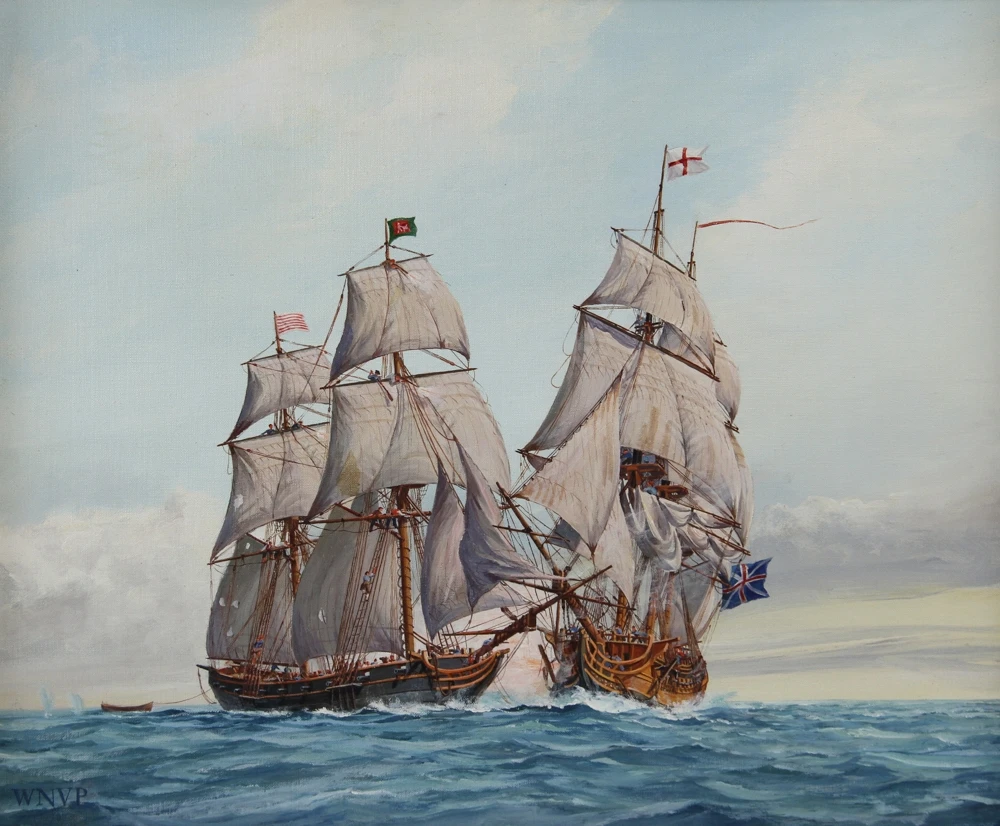
Hyder Ally engaging HMS General Monk at the Battle of Delaware Bay

By 1782, the devastating losses inflicted on Pennsylvanian merchant shipping by British warships and privateers led Philadelphia merchants to petition for better naval defenses. This resulted in the commissioning of Hyder Ally, which was outfitted by the merchants and placed under the command of the Continental Navy's Joshua Barney. After she captured HMS General Monk on April 8 at the Battle of Delaware Bay, Barney took over her command, renaming her Washington. After a trip to the West Indies, she was sold to the Continental Navy. Hyder Ally continued to patrol without significant success. By February 1783, with peace appearing to near, most of the state's ships had been sold and its sailors dismissed. On April 10, 1783, the Supreme Executive Council ordered the remaining armed vessels to be disposed of.

== Flags ==
The flags of the Pennsylvania navy were overseen by the Pennsylvania Navy Board. The board reported to the Pennsylvania Provincial Assembly's Committee of Safety. In July 1775, the President of the Committee of Safety was Benjamin Franklin. At that time, the committee ordered the construction of gunboats that would eventually need flags as part of their equipment. As late as October 1776, Captain William Richards was still writing to the Committee of Safety to request the design that he could use to order flags for the navy.

Betsy Ross was one of those hired to make flags for the Pennsylvania State Navy. An entry dated May 29, 1777, in the records of the Pennsylvania Navy Board, includes an order to pay her for her work. It is worded as follows:

An order on William Webb to Elizabeth
Ross for fourteen pounds twelve shillings and two
pence for Making Ships Colours [etc.] put into William
Richards store……………………………………….£14.12.2

The Pennsylvania navy's ship color included (1) an ensign; (2) a long, narrow pennant; and (3) a short, narrow pennant. The ensign was a blue flag with 13 stripes—seven red stripes and six white stripes in the flag's canton (upper-left-hand corner). It was flown from a pole at the rear of the ship. The long pennant had 13 vertical, red-and-white stripes near the mast; the rest was solid red. It flew from the top of the ship's mainmast, the center pole holding the sails. The short pennant was solid red, and flew from the top of the ship's mizzenmast—the pole holding the ship's sails nearest the stern (rear of the ship).

== Naval militia ==
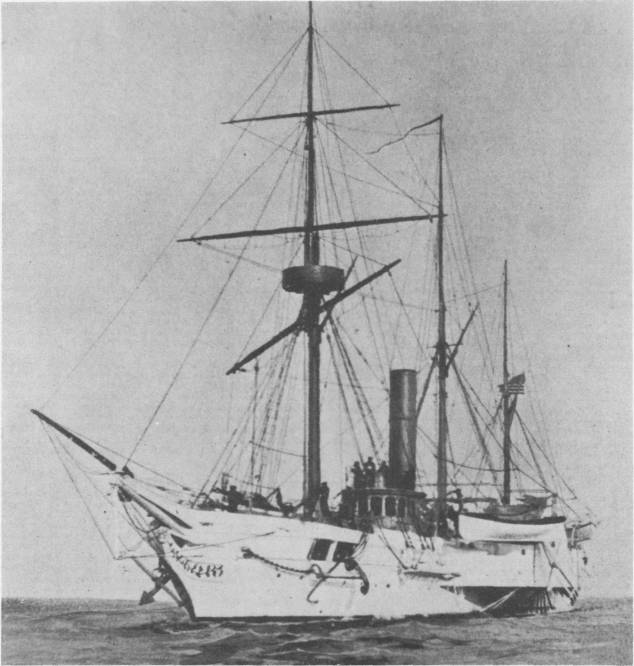
USS Wolverine

In April 1889, the Pennsylvania Naval Militia was reconstituted as the Naval Force of Pennsylvania - one of many organized state naval militias which were the predecessors to the modern day Naval Reserve. By 1894, Pennsylvania was one of many states using ships lent by the regular navy. It was organized on a battalion level.

Ships that served with this militia until the creation of the Naval Reserve included the protected cruiser USS Chicago which served from 26 April 1916 to April 1917 and the ironclad USS Wolverine which served for 11 years making summer training cruises for the Naval Reserve.
