= Hyder Ally (1782 ship) =

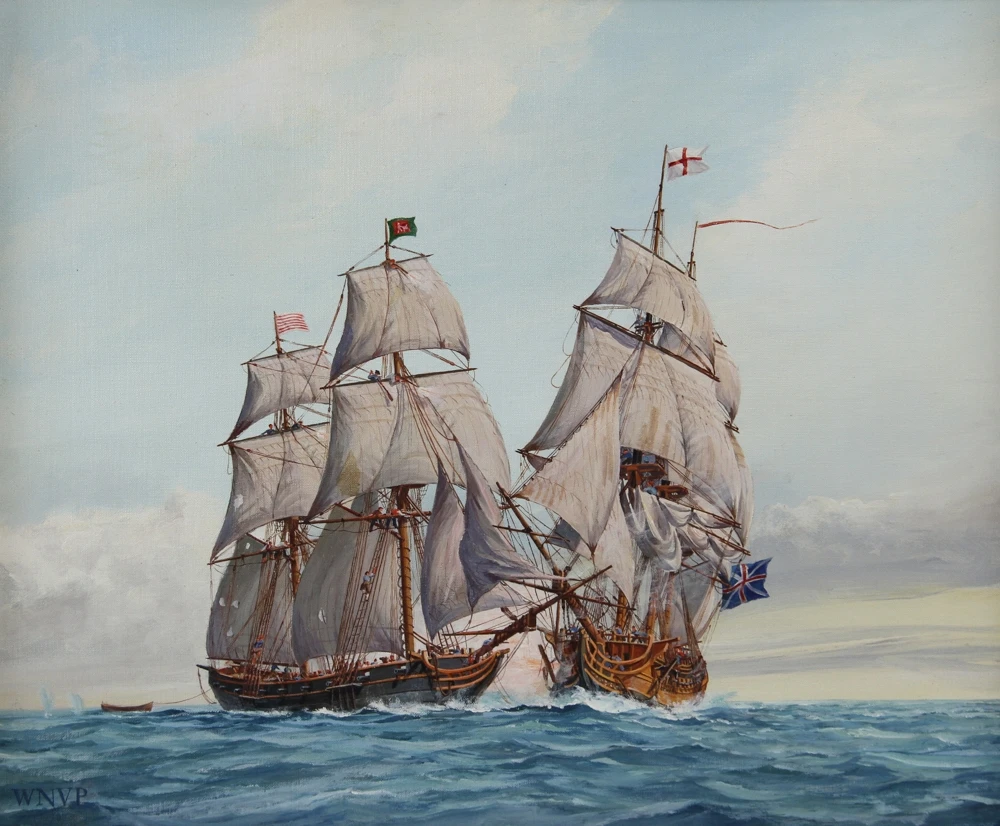
A painting of Hyder Ally in combat against the British armed sloop, General Monk, during the Battle of Delaware Bay.

Hyder Ally was an armed ship of the Pennsylvania State Navy during the American Revolutionary War. Originally a merchant vessel, the ship was acquired and armed by Pennsylvania in 1782 and named after Hyder Ali, the ruler of the Kingdom of Mysore in southern India at that time.

She was placed under the command of Lt. Joshua Barney who is best known for commanding her during the Battle of Delaware Bay on 8 April 1782. Hyder Ally engaged the more heavily armed British vessel HMS General Monk in a close engagement. Her victory became one of the notable American naval actions of the later stages of the Revolutionary War.
