= USS Hazelwood (DD-531) =

Fletcher-class destroyer

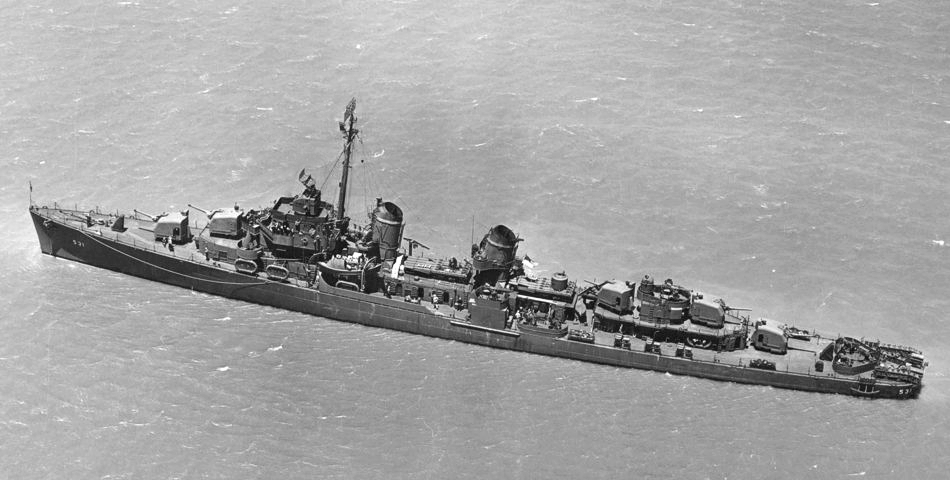
- USS Hazelwood (DD-531) in 1943

History

United States
- Namesake: John Hazelwood
- Builder: Bethlehem Shipbuilding Corporation, San Francisco, California
- Laid down: 11 April 1942
- Launched: 20 November 1942
- Commissioned: 18 June 1943 to 18 January 1946; 12 September 1951 to 19 March 1965
- Stricken: 1 December 1974
- Honours and awards: 10 Battle Stars
- Fate: Sold 14 April 1976, scrapped

General characteristics
- Class & type: Fletcher-class destroyer
- Displacement: 2,050 tons
- Length: 376 ft 6 in (114.7 m)
- Beam: 39 ft 8 in (12.1 m)
- Draft: 17 ft 9 in (5.4 m)
- Propulsion: 60,000 shp (45 MW); 2 propellers
- Speed: 35 knots (65 km/h; 40 mph)
- Range: 6500 nm (12,000 km) at 15 kn
- Complement: 336
- Armament: 5 × single Mk 12 5 in (127 mm)/38 guns; 5 × twin 40 mm (1.6 in) Bofors AA guns; 7 × single 20 mm (0.8 in) Oerlikon AA guns; 2 × quintuple 21 in (533 mm) torpedo tubes; 6 × single depth charge throwers; 2 × depth charge racks

USS Hazelwood (DD-531) was a World War II-era Fletcher-class destroyer in the service of the United States Navy. The ship was the second named for Commodore John Hazelwood; a naval leader in the American Continental Navy.

== World War II ==
Hazelwood was laid down 11 April 1942 by the Bethlehem Shipbuilding Co., San Francisco, California; launched 20 November 1942; sponsored by Mrs. Harold J. Fosdick; and commissioned 18 June 1943.

After shakedown, Hazelwood departed the West Coast 5 September. Reaching Pearl Harbor 9 September, she sailed 2 days later with a fast carrier strike force under Rear Admiral C. A. Pownall in Lexington to launch carrier-based air strikes against Tarawa, Gilbert Islands. Hazelwood next joined a second fast carrier force—6 carriers, 7 cruisers, and 24 destroyers under Rear Admiral Alfred E. Montgomery—for strikes against Wake Island 5 October and 6 October.

Returning to Pearl Harbor 11 October, the destroyer took part in intensive training to prepare for the giant amphibious drive to Japan. She joined Task Force 53 under Vice Admiral Raymond A. Spruance at Havannah Harbor, New Hebrides, 5 November. Departing 13 November, she took part in invasion of the Gilbert Islands 20 November. In one of the bitterest struggles during the fleet's push across the Pacific, she served on antisubmarine patrol and as standby fighter-director ship. Hazelwood returned to Pearl Harbor 7 December 1943 to prepare for the next operation.

As the war in the Pacific gained momentum, Hazelwood sortied from Pearl Harbor 22 January 1944 as part of Task Force 52 under Admiral Spruance for the invasion of Kwajalein and Majuro Atolls in the Marshall Islands. After troops stormed ashore 31 January, she anchored in Kwajalein Harbor as primary fighter-director ship and also patrolled against enemy submarines. This objective secured, she departed Kwajalein 15 February for several months of patrol and escort duty through the Solomons and Marshalls. She also bombarded Japanese shore positions at Ungalabu Harbor and a tank farm on New Ireland.

=== Palau ===
Hazelwood next participated in the invasion of the Palaus. As the 1st Marine Division landed on Peleliu, Palau Islands, 15 September, she pounded enemy shore positions with gunfire to lessen Japanese opposition. She remained off Peleliu on patrol until 3 October, when she sailed to Seeadler Harbor, Manus Island. There the ship joined Vice Admiral Kinkaid's naval forces for the invasion and liberation of the Philippines. As troops landed under naval cover on Leyte 20 October, Hazelwood came under heavy Japanese air attacks.

Over the next week, Hazelwood screened the escort carrier group Taffy 1 during the Battle of Leyte Gulf, accounting for at least two kamikazes destroyed.

=== Leyte Gulf ===
Hazelwood engaged in patrols off Leyte Gulf and gunnery and training exercises out of Ulithi during December. She then joined Vice Admiral McCain's fast carrier strike force and sailed 30 December. Carrying the war home to the enemy, the carriers launched heavy air raids against Japanese positions in the Ryukyu Islands, Taiwan, Okinawa, and along the China coast 3–7 January 1945. These strikes also diverted Japanese attention from the Philippines, where landings were made at Lingayen Gulf 9 January. After further strikes on Japanese positions in Indochina, the force returned to Ulithi 26 January.

=== Japan and Iwo Jima ===
Joining another fast and mobile carrier task force, Hazelwood sortied 11 February to protect carriers as they launched heavy air strikes against the Japanese home islands 16 and 17 February. Swiftly shifting positions, the fleet then sped south to provide support for the landings on Iwo Jima, begun 19 February. Although under constant attack from kamikazes as well as fighters and dive-bombers, Hazelwood came through the invasion untouched and on the night of 25 February sank two small enemy freighters with her guns.

=== Okinawa ===
Returning to Ulithi 1 March, the destroyer sailed again for action 14 March with a fast carrier force to provide air cover and shore bombardment for the invasion of Okinawa, last step before invasion of the Japanese home islands. After the invasion 1 April, Hazelwood operated off Okinawa on radar picket and escort patrols through intense Japanese air attacks. On 29 April, the carrier group she was shepherding was attacked by kamikazes who dove out of low cloud cover.

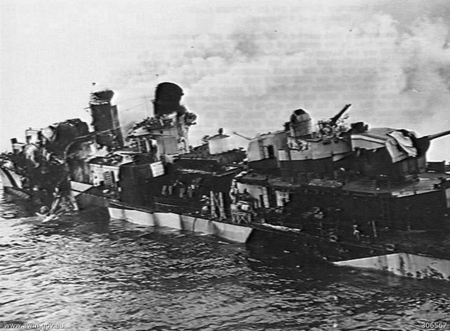
Hazelwood after the Kamikaze hit off Okinawa.

Hazelwood, all guns blazing, maneuvered to avoid two of the Zeros. A third screamed out of the clouds from astern. Although hit by Hazelwood’s fire, the enemy plane careened past the superstructure. It hit #2 stack on the port side, smashed into the bridge, and exploded. Flaming gasoline spilled over the decks and bulkheads as the mast toppled and the forward guns were put out of action. Ten officers and 67 men were killed, including the Commanding Officer, Cmdr. V. P. Douw, and 36 were missing. Hazelwood’s engineering officer, Lt. (j.g.) C. M. Locke, took command and directed her crew in fighting the damage and aiding wounded. Proceeding by tow and part way under her own power, the ship reached Ulithi 5 May for temporary repairs, then sailed to Mare Island Naval Shipyard via Pearl Harbor 14 June for permanent repairs. Hazelwood decommissioned 18 January 1946 and entered the Pacific Reserve Fleet at San Diego, California.

== Post War service ==
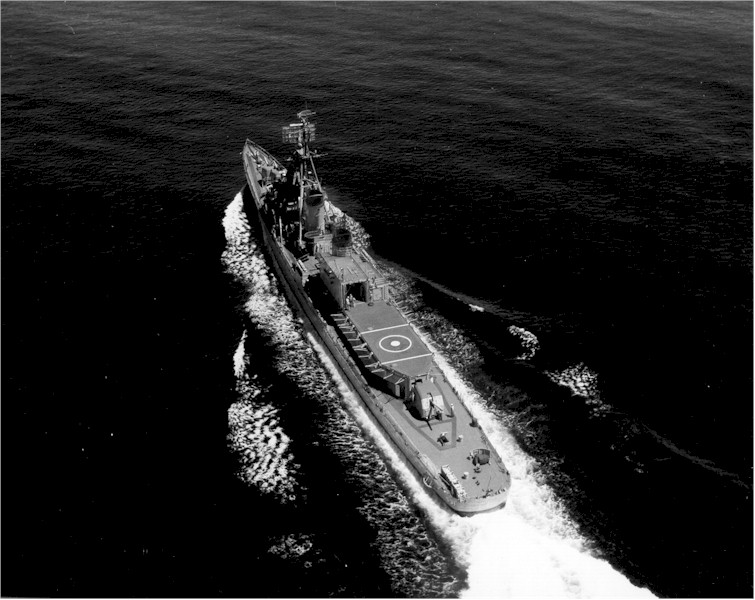
Hazelwood in 1960, fitted with the experimental flight deck.

Hazelwood recommissioned at San Diego 12 September 1951 to participate in the Korean War. After shakedown she departed San Diego 4 January 1952, and reached Newport, Rhode Island, 21 January to join Destroyer Forces, Atlantic Fleet. Operations and exercises along the East Coast and in the Caribbean, as well as hunter-killer training with carrier groups, occupied Hazelwood until she departed Newport for the Far East 7 December 1953.

She reached Tokyo 12 January 1954, via Pearl Harbor and spent the next few months operating with a fast carrier task force and patrolling along the Korean coast to enforce an uneasy armistice. The far-ranging destroyer returned to the States the long way, departing Hong Kong 28 May 1954 and sailing through the Suez Canal to reach Newport 17 July.

During the next few years, Hazelwood maintained a pattern of training and readiness operations along the East Coast and in the Caribbean interspersed with deployments to the Mediterranean. During the Suez Crisis in the fall of 1956 she served with the mighty 6th Fleet, patrolling the eastern Mediterranean and helping to stabilize a tense international situation.

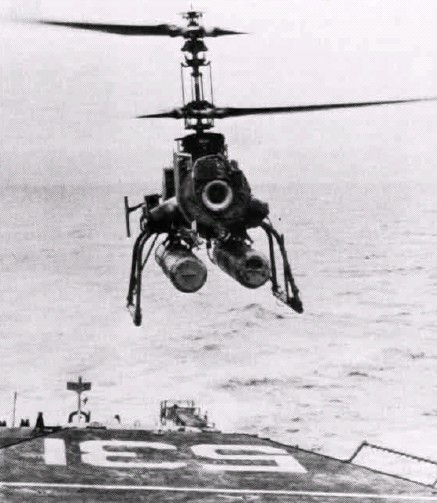
A DASH-drone over Hazelwood´s flight deck.

In 1958, Hazelwood began extensive testing of helicopters for antisubmarine warfare both in Narragansett Bay and out of the Naval Ordnance Laboratory in Maryland. Assigned to the Destroyer Development Division, she participated in tests on equipment used with radar and electronic counter-measure systems. Her primary research and development work involved the testing of the Drone Anti-Submarine Helicopter (DASH). Hazelwood provided on board testing facilities, and helped make possible the perfection of DASH, an advanced and vital ASW weapons system. In August 1963 alone, the drone helicopter made 1,000 landings on the versatile destroyer's flight deck.

In addition to experimental developments, Hazelwood continued to engage in the many duties assigned to a destroyer. As America confronted Russia over the introduction of offensive missiles into Cuba in October 1962, she steamed again to the troubled Caribbean for antisubmarine and surveillance patrols. Hazelwood arrived Guantanamo Naval Base 5 November, just after the quarantine of Cuba had gone into effect and remained on guard during the crisis, serving as a Gun Fire Support Ship for Task Force 84. When the nuclear submarine Thresher failed to surface 10 April 1963, Hazelwood immediately deployed to the scene of the tragedy with scientists from the Woods Hole Oceanographic Institution to begin a systematic search for the missing ship.

Hazelwood resumed testing of DASH during June and later in the year conducted on board trials of the Shipboard Landing Assist Device (SLAD). She continued both developmental and tactical operations along the East Coast during the next year. She decommissioned 19 March 1965, and entered the Atlantic Reserve Fleet. Hazelwood was struck from the Naval Vessel Register 1 December 1974 and sold 14 April 1976.

== Honors ==
Hazelwood received 10 battle stars for World War II service.
