= Battle of Delaware Bay =

1782 battle of the American Revolutionary War

Coordinates: 39.08317°N 74.96658°W

- Part of the American Revolutionary War
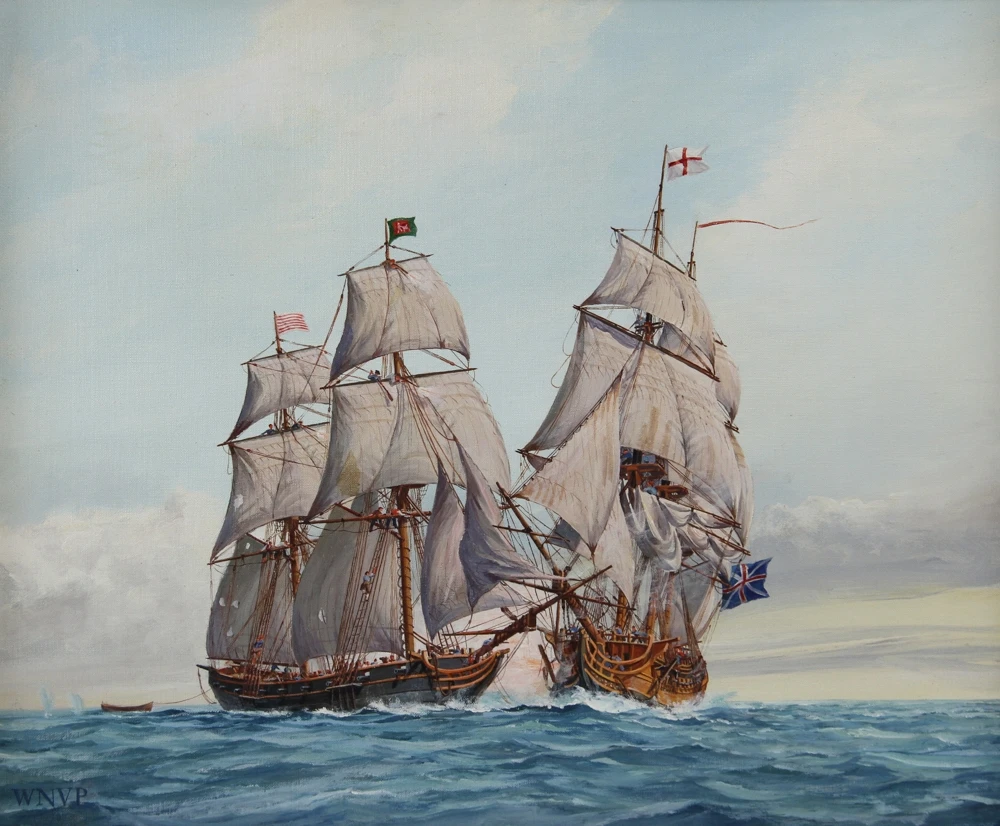
- Painting of the battle by William Nowland Van Powell
Date	April 8, 1782
Location	Off Cape May, Delaware Bay
Result	American victory

Belligerents
United States	Great Britain

Commanders and leaders
Joshua Barney	Christopher Mason; Josias Rogers (surrendered)

Strength
3 sloops	1 frigate 1 sloop-of-war 1 brig

Casualties and losses
4 killed 11 wounded 1 sloop captured	20 killed 33 wounded 1 sloop-of-war captured

The Battle of Delaware Bay, or the Battle of Cape May, was a naval engagement fought between the Kingdom of Great Britain and the United States during the American Revolutionary War. A British force of three vessels attacked three American privateers that were escorting a fleet of merchantmen. The ensuing combat in Delaware Bay near Cape May ended with the American sloop Hyder Ally capturing the British sloop-of-war HMS General Monk.

== Background ==
Twenty-three-year-old Lieutenant Joshua Barney of the Continental Navy commanded the privateer sloop Hyder Ally during the battles. She was owned by Pennsylvania businessman John Willcocks and was issued a letter of marque. The sloop was armed with 16 six-pounders and had a crew of about 110 men, officers and marines, and was named after Hyder Ali, the ruler of the Kingdom of Mysore and a British enemy. With Lieutenant Barney were two privateer sloops: 10-gun Charming Sally and 12-gun General Greene.

Barney's first command was to escort a rebel fleet of five merchantmen to Delaware Bay. During this cruise, three British ships were sighted and a battle began. The three ships were the 32-gun frigate HMS Quebec under Captain Christopher Mason, the 18-gun sloop-of-war HMS General Monk under Captain Josias Rogers, and a Loyalist privateer brig named Fair American from New York. Fair American was the former American privateer General Washington, commanded by Silas Talbot at her capture.

== Battle ==
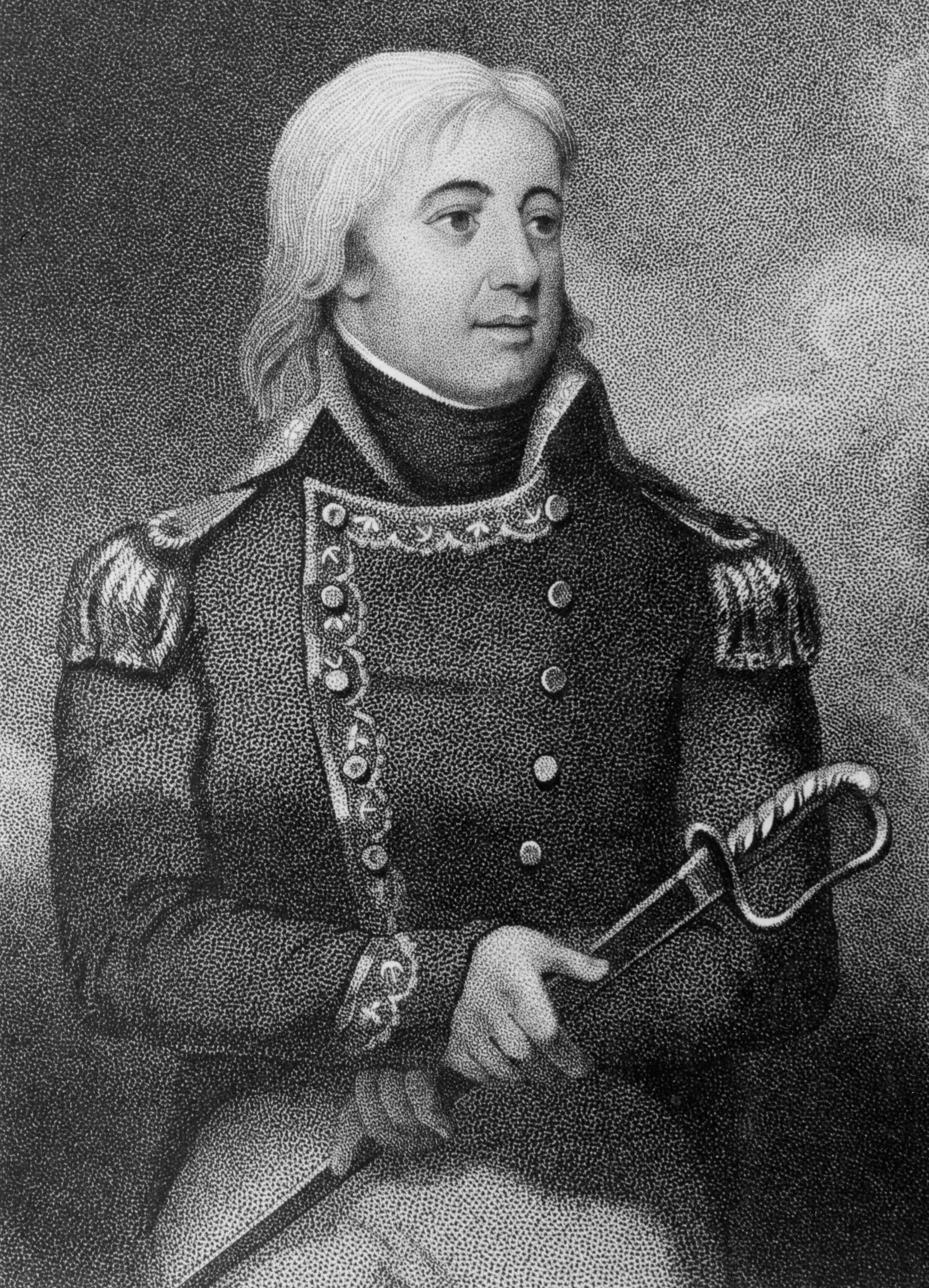
Portrait of Barney

At nightfall on April 7, 1782, the American convoy anchored within Cape May due to calm after the wind had abated. Later that night the British in Quebec and General Monk sighted the enemy fleet and anchored off the cape to make preparations to attack Hyder Ally: she was considered the most formidable ship of the fleet. Unaware of the British vessels nearby, the Americans spent the night believing they were safe. The following morning three British privateers were spotted and Mason signaled them to join him; only Fair American responded. At 10:00 am the Americans sighted the British vessels approaching. Lieutenant Barney ordered the merchantmen to flee up Delaware Bay under the protection of General Greene and Charming Sally, while Hyder Ally remained behind to engage the British. The fleet was directed to sail as close to the shoreline as possible so as to disallow pursuit. The larger British vessels would have difficulty following in the shallow water.

General Greene disobeyed Barney's orders and prepared for battle. Charming Sally grounded on a shoal and was abandoned by her crew. At about 11:00 am the three British vessels were identified by the Americans. Quebec stood off nearby Cape Henlopen to prevent the Americans from escaping Cape May into the Atlantic, but this was unnecessary as the Americans were headed into the bay rather than into open sea. Fair American led the advance with General Monk behind. Sometime after noon the British came within range of the two American privateers. To try to lure General Monk closer, Barney turned about as if attempting to flee. Fair American opened fire with a broadside followed by another; the shots were accurate but caused little damage. Still in a fake retreat, Hyder Ally's gun ports remained closed and no shots had yet been fired by the Americans. General Greene did the same as Hyder Ally and turned around, but she grounded just outside British gun range. The trick had worked: Fair American broke off the effort to attack General Greene as General Monk proceeded forward to attack Hyder Ally. Fortunately for the Americans, Fair American grounded in shallow water and was put out of the action permanently because of damage to her hull.

Heading forward, Rogers decided to slow down and launch a boat to take the abandoned Charming Sally, after which he continued on until he caught up with Hyder Ally. When within range of pistols, Rogers ordered her to surrender. Barney answered with a broadside of grape, canister and round shot that raked the deck of General Monk, killing some of her crew. General Monk replied with her bow chasers, which were the only weapons bearing down on the Americans at the time. Barney ordered his ship to port and unleashed another broadside whose shots passed through the sails and rigging of General Monk and damaged her main and top-gallant masts. Before the battle, the crew of General Monk had bored their ship's six-pounders to fire nine-pound balls. This proved fatal when General Monk came within a few yards off Hyder Ally's beam for a full broadside of their own. When they fired, General Monk's cannons were torn up from the deck and flipped over. Several sailors burned themselves as they tried to right the cannons.

A few minutes later the two sloops had drifted close enough to each other that the British and Americans could hear each other shouting commands. Barney took the opportunity to reload his cannon but he did not give his gunners the order to open fire. Instead, Barney shouted "hard a-port, do you want him to run abroad of us?". Hearing this, Rogers ordered his ship to port as Barney ordered his vessel to starboard. As a result, the two vessels collided and became entangled in each other's rigging. The American sailors fastened General Monk to their ship to prevent her from breaking loose and then fired their broadside. The shots knocked out some of General Monk's guns and sent the crew into confusion. The American marines sat high in the rigging of Hyder Ally and poured musket fire into General Monk. Barney's men boarded while he remained on top of the compass box to direct the attack.

About this time the box was shot out from under Barney's feet but he suffered only a slight injury. Barney also ordered that his port-side guns be turned around to the starboard so they could assist in the battle. After only 26 minutes of close-quarters combat, Rogers was wounded and all of his officers were killed except a midshipman who struck the colors. The British had suffered 20 killed and 33 wounded. General Monk was captured and Fair American was aground and stranded, and so Quebec decided to retreat. American forces suffered the loss of four killed and 11 wounded. Charming Sally was captured without a fight, Hyder Ally was damaged considerably, and General Greene was grounded but re-floated after Quebec began her retreat.

== Aftermath ==
The Americans won the day and Barney was given command of the prize General Monk, which had well over 300 shot-holes in her sides. Barney sailed both Hyder Ally and Monk to Chester, Pennsylvania, where he left Hyder Ally and sailed on to Philadelphia in Monk. He was then ordered to France to deliver dispatches to Benjamin Franklin. After the war ended Barney joined the French Navy. During the War of 1812, Barney was a captain, commanded the Chesapeake Bay Flotilla, and later commanded marines and sailors at the Battle of Bladensburg.

== Order of battle ==
Continental Navy:

- Hyder Ally, was, flagship
- Charming Sally, was
- General Greene, was

Royal Navy:

- HMS Quebec, frigate, flagship
- HMS General Monk, sloop-of-war
- Fair American, brig

== See also ==
- Sampson Incident

== Bibliography ==
- Brewington, Myron V. (1939) The Battle of Delaware Bay, 1782. (U.S. Naval Institute). ASIN B0008BW3TM
- Goldbrough, Charles W. (1824). The United States' Naval Chronicle.
- Rowe, William H. (1948). The Maritime History of Maine. W.W. Norton.
- Joshua Barney: hero of the Revolution and 1812
- Hazard's Register of Pennsylvania, Volumes 9-10
