= USS Barney (DDG-6) =

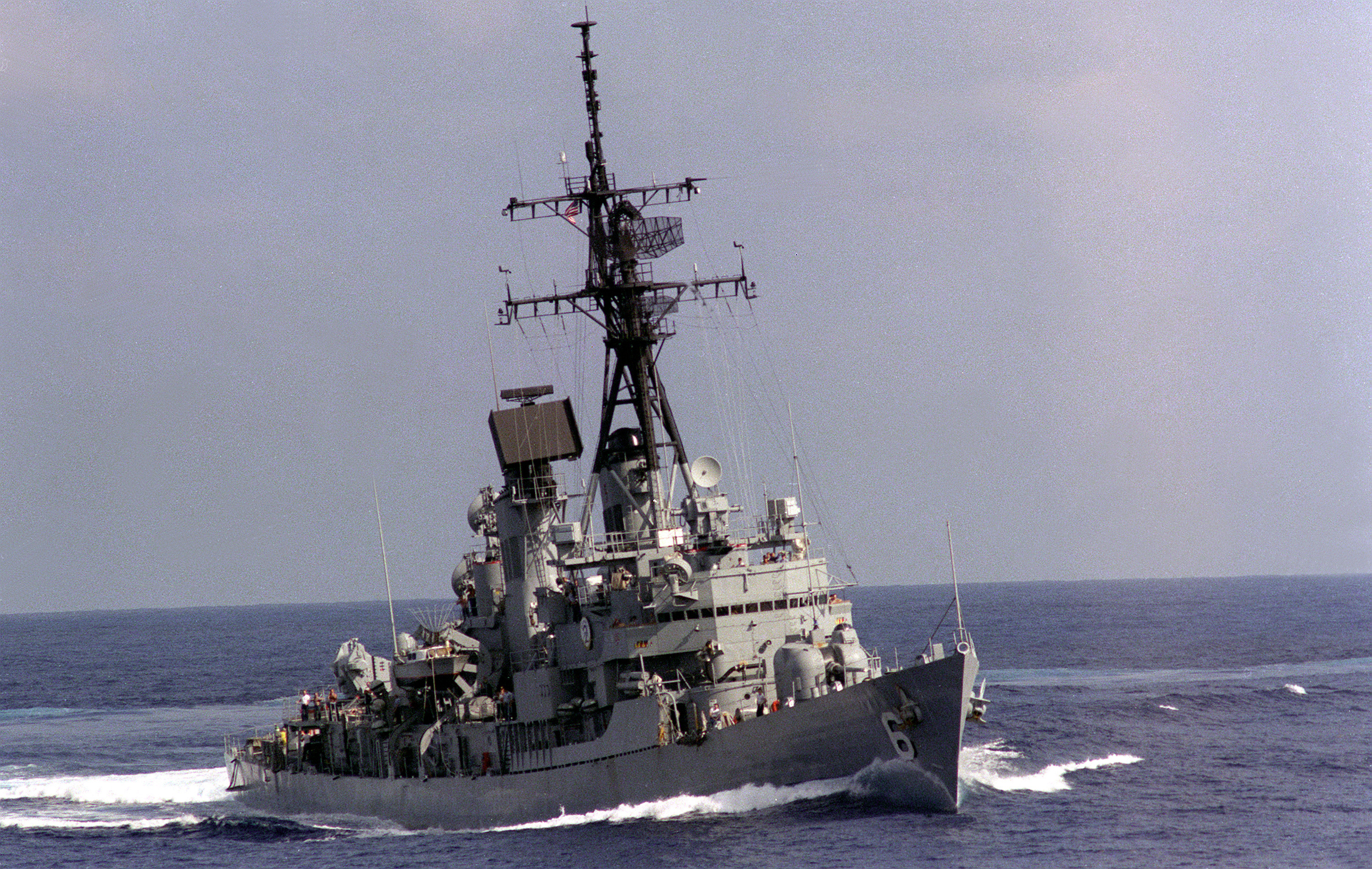
- USS Barney on 1 November 1984

History

United States
- Name: Barney
- Namesake: Joshua Barney
- Ordered: 28 March 1957
- Builder: New York Shipbuilding Corporation
- Laid down: 10 August 1959
- Launched: 10 December 1960
- Acquired: 31 July 1962
- Commissioned: 11 August 1962
- Decommissioned: 17 December 1990
- Reclassified: DDG-6, 23 April 1957
- Stricken: 20 November 1992
- Identification: Callsign: NDSD; Hull number: DD-956
- Fate: Scrapped, 22 February 2006
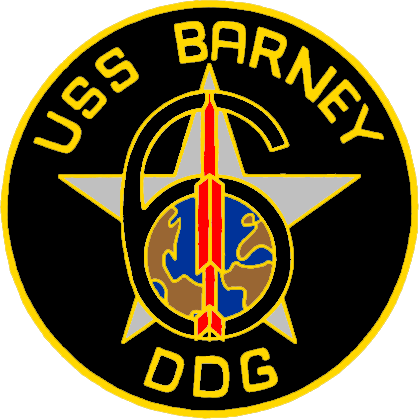
- Badge

General characteristics
- Class & type: Charles F. Adams-class destroyer
- Displacement: 3,277 tons standard, 4,526 full load
- Length: 437 ft (133 m)
- Beam: 47 ft (14 m)
- Draft: 15 ft (4.6 m)
- Propulsion: 2 × Westinghouse steam turbines providing 70,000 shp (52 MW); 2 shafts; 4 × Foster Wheeler 1,275 psi (8,790 kPa) boilers
- Speed: 33 knots (61 km/h; 38 mph)
- Range: 4,500 nautical miles (8,300 km) at 20 knots (37 km/h)
- Complement: 354 (24 officers, 330 enlisted)
- Sensors & processing systems: AN/SPS-39 3D air search radar; AN/SPS-10 surface search radar; AN/SPG-51 missile fire control radar; AN/SPG-53 gunfire control radar; AN/SQS-23 Sonar and the hull mounted SQQ-23 Pair Sonar for DDG-2 through 19; AN/SPS-40 Air Search Radar
- Armament: 1 Mk 11 missile launcher (DDG2-14) or Mk 13 single arm missile launcher (DDG-15-24) for RIM-24 Tartar SAM system, or later the RIM-66 Standard (SM-1) and Harpoon antiship missile; 2 × 5"/54 caliber Mark 42 (127 mm) gun; 1 × RUR-5 ASROC Launcher; 6 × 12.8 in (324 mm) ASW Torpedo Tubes (2 x Mark 32 Surface Vessel Torpedo Tubes)

USS Barney (DD-956/DDG-6) was a Charles F. Adams-class guided missile destroyer in the United States Navy. She was the third Navy ship named for Commodore Joshua Barney USN (1759–1818).

Her original designation was DD-956. On 23 April 1957, it was decided to build her as a guided missile destroyer.

Barney was laid down by the New York Shipbuilding Corporation at Camden, New Jersey on 10 August 1959, launched on 10 December 1960, sponsored by Mrs. Harry D. Wortman, and commissioned at the Philadelphia Naval Shipyard on 11 August 1962.

== 1960s ==
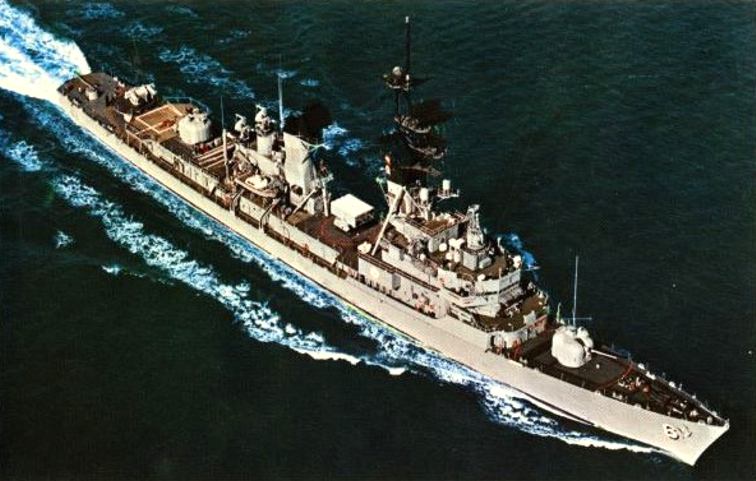
Barney underway in 1962

After outfitting at Philadelphia, the guided missile destroyer put to sea on 27 September to conduct pre-shakedown qualification tests off the Virginia Capes and missile firings at Roosevelt Roads near Puerto Rico. At the conclusion of that mission, she arrived in Norfolk, Virginia, on 8 December and remained there until the end of the year. Barney embarked upon her shakedown cruise on New Year's Day 1963 and returned to Norfolk on 20 February 1963 for availability alongside a destroyer tender before moving north to the Philadelphia Naval Shipyard in mid-March for a post shakedown overhaul. The guided missile destroyer completed the overhaul on 31 May and began normal operations out of Norfolk with the 2nd Fleet. That fall, she headed for the Mediterranean Sea for a five-month cruise with the 6th Fleet. During that deployment, she made port visits and conducted training operations with units of the 6th Fleet and with ships of Allied navies. The warship returned to Norfolk in March 1964 and resumed operations with the 2nd Fleet.

In September 1964, she returned to sea to participate in a series of NATO exercises. Those evolutions continued into November when Barney headed back to Norfolk. Type training and 2nd Fleet operations carried her into the New Year. On 15 February 1965, she embarked upon her second tour of duty in the Mediterranean. For the next five months, the warship steamed the length and breadth of the "middle sea" in the screen of a fast carrier task force. She visited a number of ports in France, Italy, and Turkey and participated in a bilateral, American French, anti-submarine warfare (ASW) exercise, Operation "Fairgame III." Barney returned to Norfolk on 12 July 1965. Second Fleet operations out of Norfolk kept her busy for the remainder of 1965 and the first two months of 1966. Those evolutions included a tour of duty at Key West, Florida, early in January as school ship for the Fleet Sonar School. On 1 March, Barney entered the Norfolk Naval Shipyard to begin her first regular overhaul.

Repairs complete, the guided missile destroyer put to sea on 26 September to conduct ship's qualification tests and missile firings. On 7 November, she began a month of post overhaul refresher training out of Guantánamo Bay, Cuba. Following that, the warship conducted a missile firing exercise on the Atlantic Fleet Weapons Range located near Puerto Rico and a gun shoot at Culebra Island. After a visit to St. Thomas in the Virgin Islands, Barney returned to Norfolk on 19 December and remained in the Hampton Roads area for the rest of 1966.

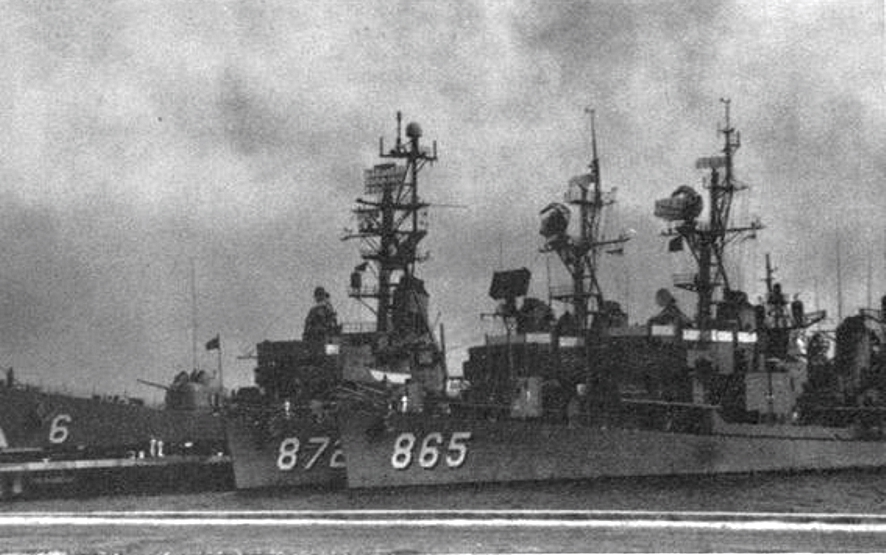
Barney, Charles R. Ware and Forrest Royal docked at Midway Atoll, March 1967

In mid February 1967, the warship departed Norfolk bound for the Far East and her only cruise in the combat zone during the Vietnam War. That deployment lasted almost exactly seven months. On the outbound voyage, she stopped at Mayport, Florida; Guantánamo Bay; the Panama Canal Zone; Pearl Harbor, Hawaii; Midway Island; Guam in the Marianas; and at Subic Bay in the Philippines. While off Vietnam, Barney served in various ways. She performed duty as sea air rescue controller, interdicted Viet Cong seaborne logistics, and shelled targets ashore in both North and South Vietnam. On several occasions, the guided missile destroyer came within range of enemy shore batteries. She suffered no hits, but a member of her crew was wounded, lost his leg, by a shell fragment from a near miss. The warship also visited Hong Kong and ports in the Philippine Islands and in Japan.

Reversing her outbound itinerary—and adding a stop at Okinawa--Barney returned to Norfolk on 19 September 1967 and began a post deployment leave and upkeep period. Following the standdown time, the warship resumed operations along the Atlantic seaboard. That occupation continued until early in March 1968 when Barney departed Norfolk for her third deployment with the 6th Fleet. Exercises and port visits constituted her main fare as they had in the past. The warship concluded her assignment with the 6th Fleet on 12 July when she departed Pollença Bay, Mallorca, to return to Norfolk. She reentered her homeport on 22 July 1968.

After completing the usual post-deployment standdown, Barney resumed 2d Fleet operations out of Norfolk. Those operations included the annual winter exercise in the West Indian waters in January 1969 and ASW exercises off the coast of Florida late in February and early in March. She returned to Norfolk on 5 March 1969 to prepare for overseas movement. The guided missile destroyer stood out of Norfolk again on 1 April, bound for European waters. Later that month before Barney joined the 6th Fleet, she participated in a trilateral ASW exercise with American, Spanish, and Portuguese warships. That operation was followed by hunter killer exercises in cooperation with USS Wasp. Between 14 and 22 May, the guided missile destroyer visited Portsmouth, England, for the naval review celebrating the 20th anniversary of NATO. She resumed hunter-killer exercises on 22 May and continued them until 2 June when she entered the Mediterranean.

Immediately upon joining the 6th Fleet, Barney took part in a bilateral ASW exercise with other units of the fleet and ships of the French Navy. She then visited several ports before joining in an amphibious exercise conducted at Sardinia early in August. More port visits and a carrier screening exercise followed. Finally, on 28 September, she was relieved by USS Stickell at Pollença Bay, Mallorca. On the 30th, Barney headed back to the United States and arrived in Norfolk on 10 October. The customary leave and upkeep period followed. On 1 December 1969, the guided missile destroyer entered the Norfolk Naval Shipyard to begin regular overhaul.

== 1970s ==
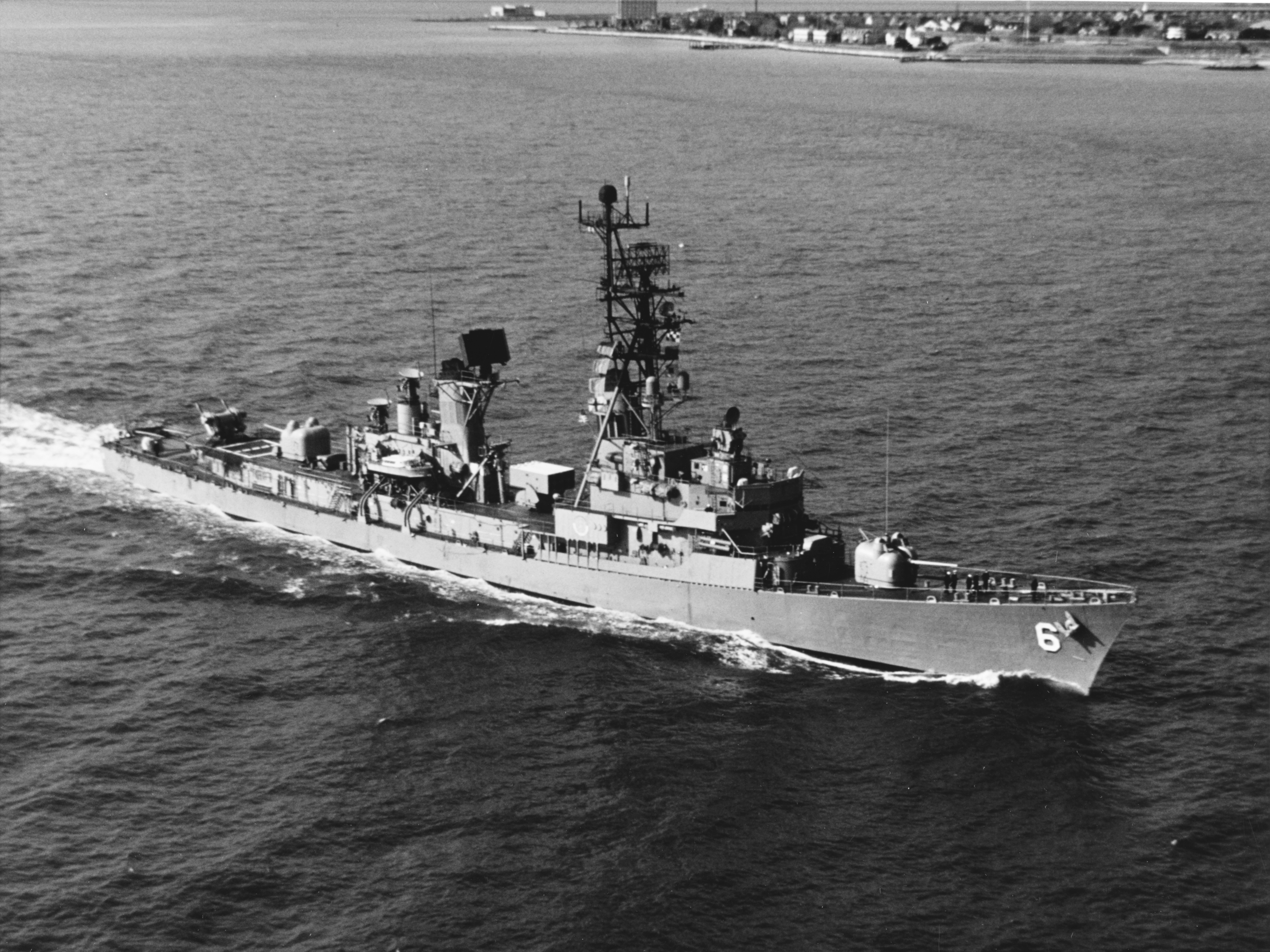
Barney underway in 1971

Barney completed repairs in June 1970. After post-repair trials, she departed Norfolk on 7 July for refresher training in the West Indies. That assignment lasted until September when she began missile exercises. Those, however, were cut short by an urgent need for her presence in the eastern Mediterranean in response to the Jordanian crisis that resulted when open fighting erupted between the Jordanian Army and PLO guerillas. Barney departed Norfolk on 23 September and arrived on station with Task Group (TG) 60.1 on 7 October. Built around carrier John F. Kennedy, TG 60.1—with Barney in the screen—cruised the eastern Mediterranean until the crisis abated early in November. The guided missile destroyer operated with the 6th Fleet for about another month during which time she visited Spanish, Italian, and Maltese ports. On 8 December 1970, she departed Rota, Spain, to return to the United States. She tied up at Norfolk on the 15th and began post deployment and holiday standdown.

Resuming normal operations at and out of Norfolk on 15 January 1971, she underwent various efficiency inspections and got underway frequently for multiship exercises, type training, and single ship drills. She remained so occupied through the summer and into the fall. In October, Barney began preparations for another tour of duty with the 6th Fleet. On 1 December, the warship stood out of Norfolk wearing the pennant of the Commander, Destroyer Squadron (DesRon) 2. She joined the 6th Fleet at Rota on the 9th and, for the next six months, cruised in the Mediterranean in company with other ships of the 6th Fleet, most frequently in a task group built around John F. Kennedy. The guided missile destroyer visited ports on the European, African, and Middle Eastern shores of the "middle sea." She frequently engaged in intelligence surveillance missions directed at Soviet ships in the area. She also participated in at least one bilateral exercise—with HMS Juno of the Royal Navy—as well as in a number of unilateral exercises with other units of the 6th Fleet. On 22 June, she departed the Mediterranean to return home. Barney arrived back in Norfolk on 29 June 1972. After the normal leave and upkeep period, she resumed operations out of Norfolk. It was announced that Barney would be relieving a destroyer currently on operations in Vietnam, with operations to begin in January 1973. However, during the prep period for this deployment, Nixon's "Vietnamization" plan had begun to be implemented. This had Barney's deployment order 'frozen'. During this 'freeze' period the decision to deploy Barney to Nato force beginning in July 1973 was ordered. This change of deployment orders allowed for the implementation of the power plant conversion from 600 PSI operation to 1200 PSI, and the conversion of fuel from 'black oil' to Navy distillate. Those evolutions continued until 8 November when work began to convert her main propulsion plant to the use of Navy distillate fuel.

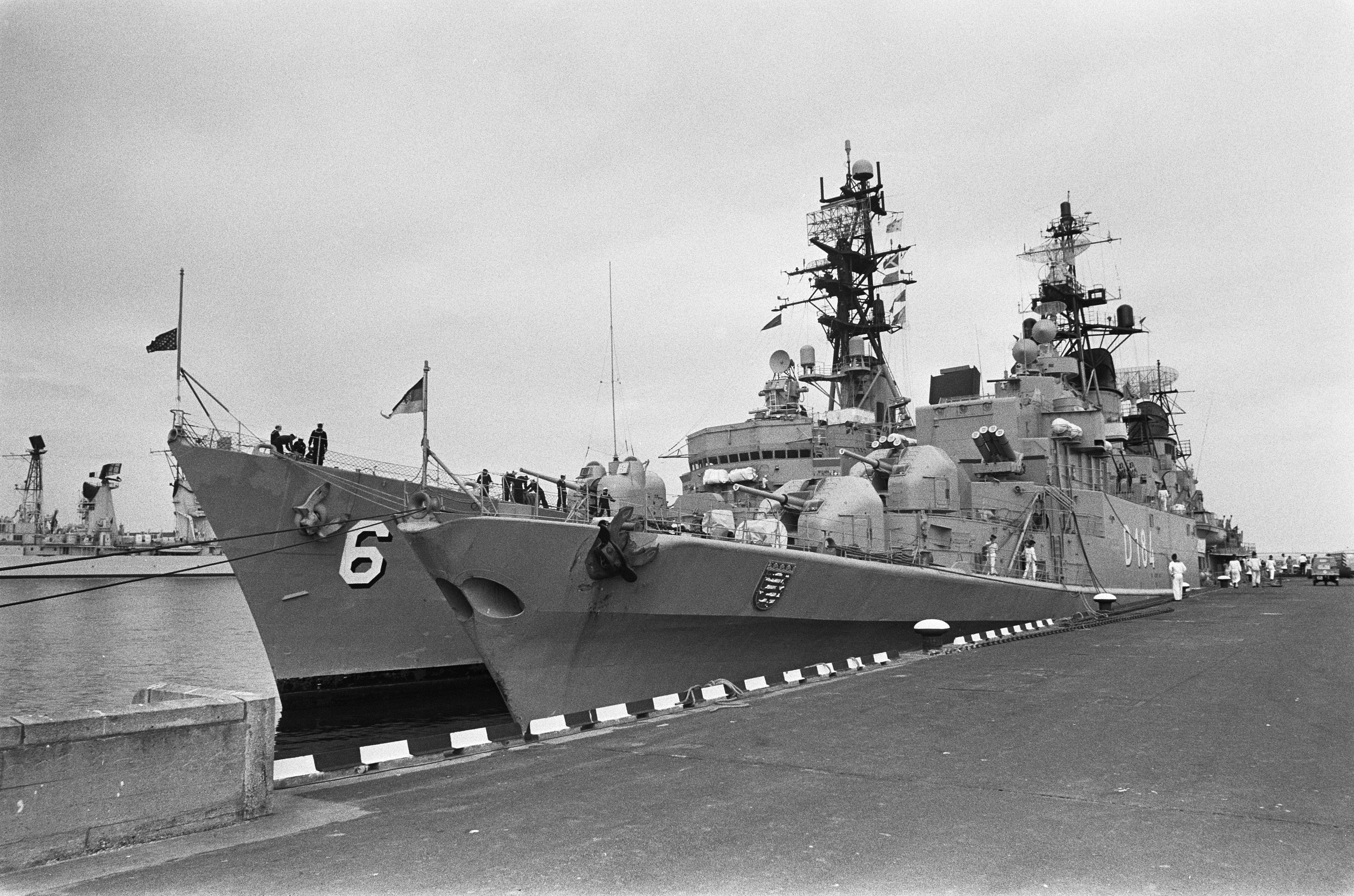
Barney alongside Hessen at Den Helder on 1 August 1984

Barney's fuel conversion lasted until early in the spring of 1973. On 23 April, she got underway from Norfolk for refresher training in the West Indies. The warship returned to Norfolk on 19 May and remained there until 25 June when she got underway to join NATO's Standing Naval Force, Atlantic. Barney arrived at the Royal Navy dockyard, Portsmouth, England, on 6 July and operated with the NATO force in European waters for the next five months. During that period, she participated in three multinational maneuvers. One took her into the Baltic where she shadowed Soviet bloc warships. Another saw her cross the Arctic Circle at zero longitude (acquiring the Blue Nose), while the third took place in the North Sea. While on operations in the area of the Kategat and Skaggerak, between Denmark and Sweden, Barney's propellers struck bottom at a speed of about 21 to 24 knots. Mud and rocks were observed by the fantail watch to be thrown skyward. Engineering called for a full stop, as seawater was flowing into the aft engineroom with some gusto up the port shaft alley. The impact to the portside propeller had broken one leg of the shaft strut from the hull and the ensuing wobble produced in the shaft had the 'packing' on the portside shaft displaced into the engineroom followed by flooding. The 'snipes' did a great job to replace the packing and allow Barney to get back underway, however, speed was limited to a max of 14 knots for the remainder of the deployment. Any attempts at more speed resulted in the shaft packing seal pushing up into the engine room with inevitable flooding. The extent of the damage was unknown to the Captain and crew until a pierside underwater exam complete with live video recording was made in Norfolk (Capt. Corr was standing beside me watching the video). The result of this examination which revealed the extensive damage to both propellers and shafts forced an out of cycle shipyard overhaul, as Barney was unable to be deployed as an effective fighting ship. While finishing the Nato deployment under limited speed restrictions, on 5 December, Barney departed the Nato force and headed back to the United States. She arrived in Norfolk on 17 December 1973 and began the usual post deployment standdown period. It was during this standdown that the divers conducted the pierside inspection which revealed the extent of the damage. She remained at Norfolk through the end of the year and for the first three months of 1974. It was during this period the determination was made to 'jump' Barney ahead of other ships that were due to receive the AN/SQQ-23PAIR sonar retrofit, and conduct the needed major engineering repairs at the same time. On 4 April, she made the short, round trip to Yorktown and back to unload ammunition in preparation for out of cycle overhaul. She stood out of Norfolk on 10 April and arrived at the Philadelphia Naval Shipyard the next day.

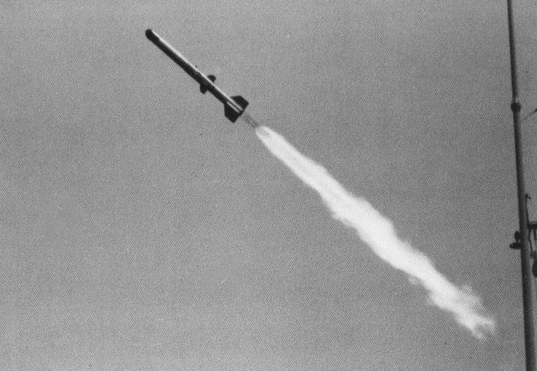
RUR-5 ASROC launch from Barney in 1976

Barney completed her overhaul on 24 February 1975 and arrived back in Norfolk the 26th. She spent the rest of the year operating out of Norfolk, first engaged in post-overhaul refresher training and qualifications and, later, conducting normal Atlantic Fleet operations. That employment carried her into 1976. On 7 July 1976, the guided missile destroyer departed Norfolk bound for the Mediterranean. She reached Rota on 17 July and relieved USS Sellers. For the next six months, she cruised the "middle sea" making port visits and conducting exercises with other units of the 6th Fleet and with elements of allied navies. On 28 January 1977, Barney departed Leixões, Portugal, to return to the United States. She tied up at Norfolk on 7 February and, after two weeks of leave and upkeep, went into the drydock at the Norfolk Naval Shipyard for repairs to her sonar dome. The guided missile destroyer completed repairs on 14 April and, after sea trials, resumed normal operations out of Norfolk a week later. Training evolutions and inspections occupied her for the remainder of the year and for the first 10 weeks of 1978.

On 16 March 1978, Barney departed Norfolk on her way back to the Mediterranean. After stops at Bermuda and at Ponta Delgada in the Azores, she arrived in Rota on the 27th and joined the 6th Fleet. However, Barney remained in the "middle sea" only briefly. On 6 April, she transited the Suez Canal and became a unit of the Middle East Force. The warship conducted exercises and made port visits at various East African and Persian Gulf ports over the next four months. She also collected intelligence on Soviet ships operating in the vicinity. On 12 August, she retransited the Suez Canal and briefly rejoined the 6th Fleet. After a stop at Rota on 21 and 22 August, she headed back to the United States and reached Norfolk on 1 September. After three weeks of post deployment leave and upkeep, the guided missile destroyer entered the Norfolk Naval Shipyard on 29 September for a regular overhaul.

== 1980s ==
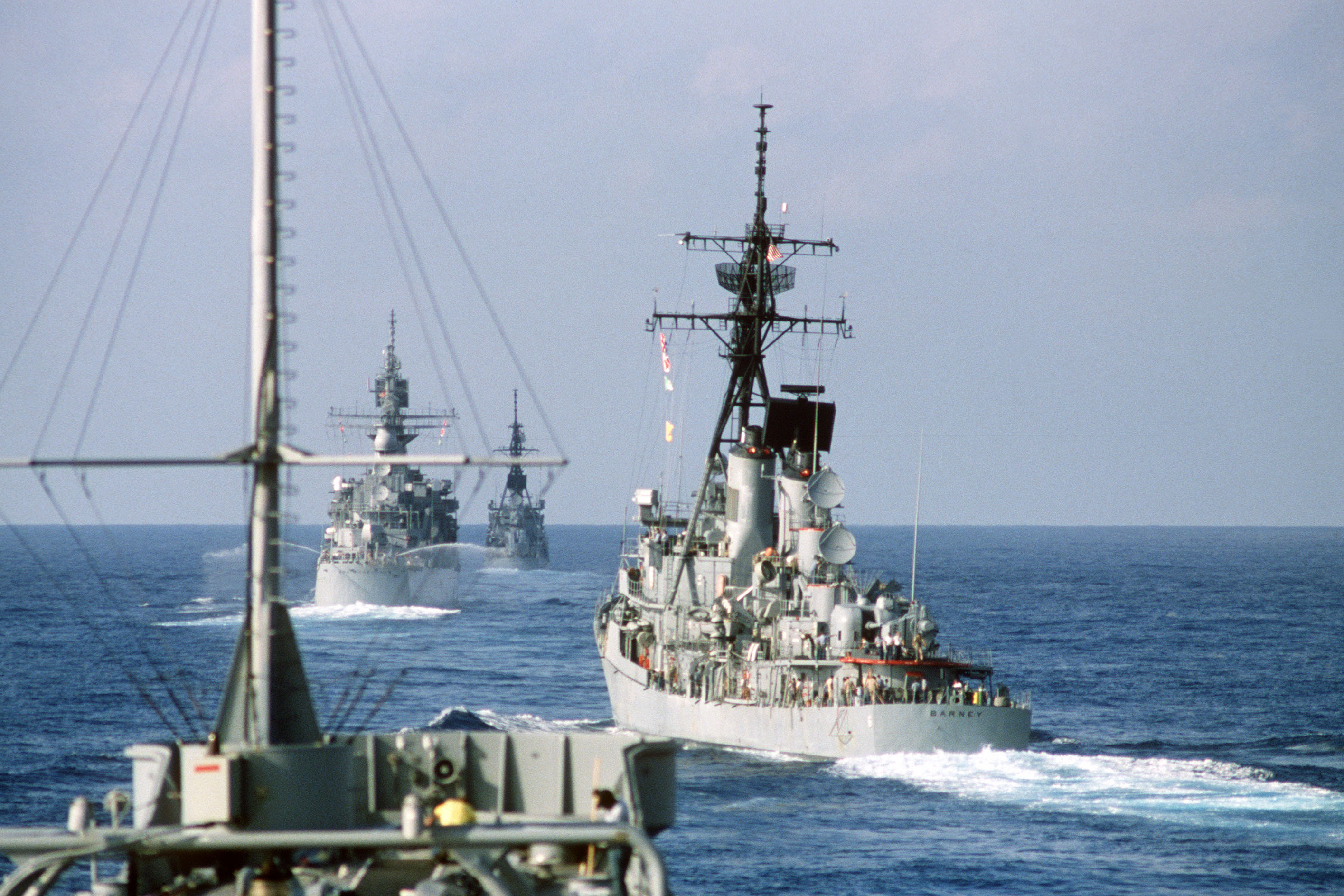
Barney underway in formation, 1984

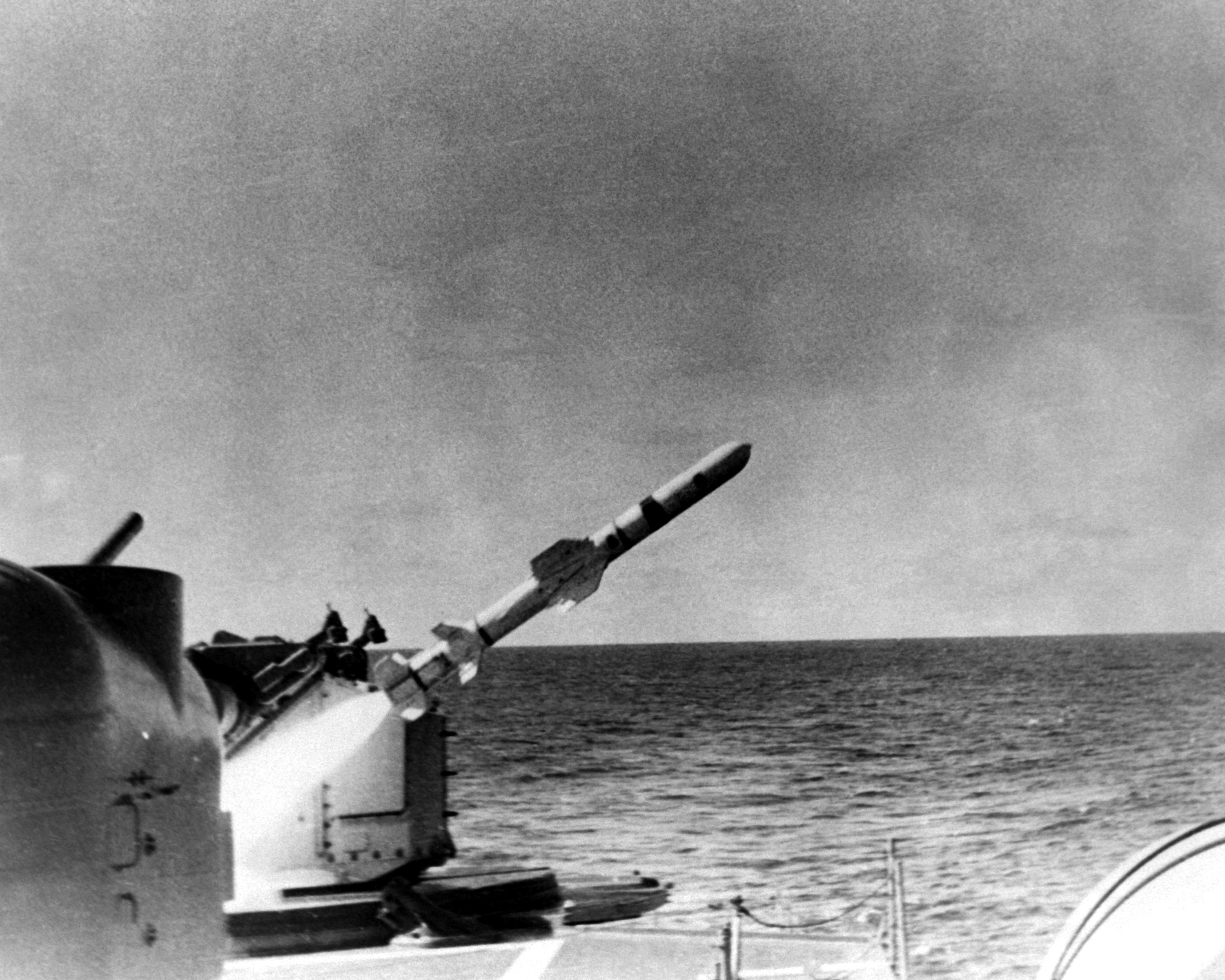
Barney launches Harpoon missile in 1982

The repairs lasted for more than a year. She returned to active duty on 5 November 1979 and for the remainder of that year conducted post overhaul refresher training. Over the next year, she operated along the east coast and in the West Indies training and undergoing inspections. On 18 November 1980, Barney stood out of Norfolk bound for the Mediterranean Sea. She arrived in Rota, Spain on the 29th and joined the 6th Fleet. On 21 December, she transited the Suez Canal once again and joined the Middle East Force. Again, she visited many East African and Persian Gulf ports. That assignment lasted until 22 February 1981 when she departed Bahrain to begin the long voyage home. Steaming via the Suez Canal and performing a short tour of duty with the 6th Fleet en route, Barney arrived back in Norfolk on 9 April. After post deployment leave and upkeep, she resumed 2d Fleet operations out of Norfolk. Three other six-month deployments would occur during the 80's: Indian Ocean Jan 1982-July 1982, Red Sea/Persian Gulf/Indian Ocean Cruise in 84–85. Also, in 1987–1988 Barney embarked on a Med Cruise that involved a stint with other NATO countries in a joint exercise with other NATO ships (including HMS Ambuscade, BMS Molders, TCG Yucitepe and a Spanish, Australian and Canadian ship) and crews. Port visits included stops at: Taranto, Genoa and Naples in Italy – Marseilles, Toulon and Cannes in France – Alexandria, Egypt – Izmir, Turkey – Haifa, Israel – Cagliari, Sardinia – Palermo, Sicily- Barcelona, Spain After this exercise concluded, she then operated as an escort for the USS Coral Sea battle group before returning to her home port in Norfolk.

Duties in between deployments included ship yard repair stints, one in Norfolk Naval Shipyard and another extended repair stay at Sparrows Point Shipyard in Dundalk (Baltimore), Md. Afterwards, she conducted a pair of joint Navy/Coast Guard Narcotic Interdiction Ops cruises in the Caribbean, including refresher training in Guantánamo Bay, Cuba in preparation for what would be her final cruise in August 1989.

The Barneys final six-month deployment was another 'Med Cruise' in 1989–1990. With several port visits that included Naples, Italy- Cavalier, France- Haifa, Israel- Tunis, Tunisia- Dubrovnik, Yugoslavia- Rota, Spain while a member of the USS Forrestal Carrier Battle Group.

== Decommissioning and fate ==
Barney was decommissioned on 17 December 1990, stricken from the Naval Vessel Register on 20 November 1992 and sold for scrap on 15 April 1994. The scrap contract was terminated on 1 October 1996 and the ship was returned to the Navy on 10 February 1999. The ship was resold on 22 February 2006 for dismantling.
