= USS Commodore Barney =

Gunboat of the United States Navy

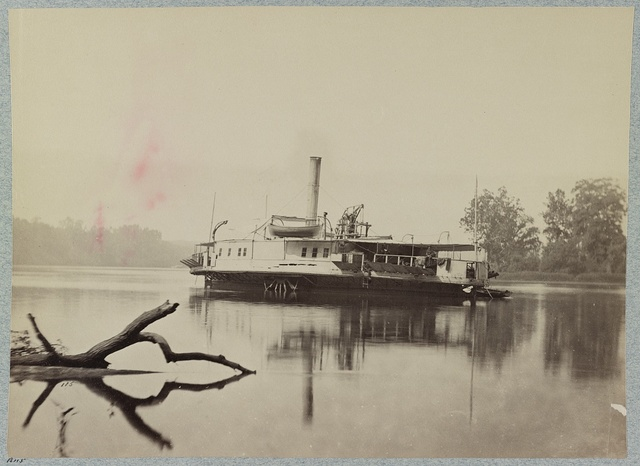
- USS Commodore Barney

History

United States
- Name: USS Commodore Barney
- Namesake: Joshua Barney
- Ordered: as Ethan Allen
- Launched: 1859 at New York City
- Acquired: 2 October 1861
- Commissioned: October 1861
- Decommissioned: 5 May 1865 at the Washington Navy Yard
- Fate: Sold, 20 July 1865

General characteristics
- Type: Gunboat
- Displacement: 512 long tons (520 t)
- Length: 143 ft (44 m)
- Beam: 33 ft (10 m)
- Draft: 9 ft (2.7 m)
- Propulsion: Steam engine; side-wheel propelled
- Speed: 8 kn (9.2 mph; 15 km/h)
- Complement: 96
- Armament: 1 × 100-pounder rifle; 3 × 9 in (229 mm) smoothbore guns

USS Commodore Barney was a ferryboat acquired by the Union Navy during the American Civil War. Ferryboats were of great value, since, because of their flat bottom and shallow draft, they could navigate streams and shallow waters that other ships could not.

== Service history ==
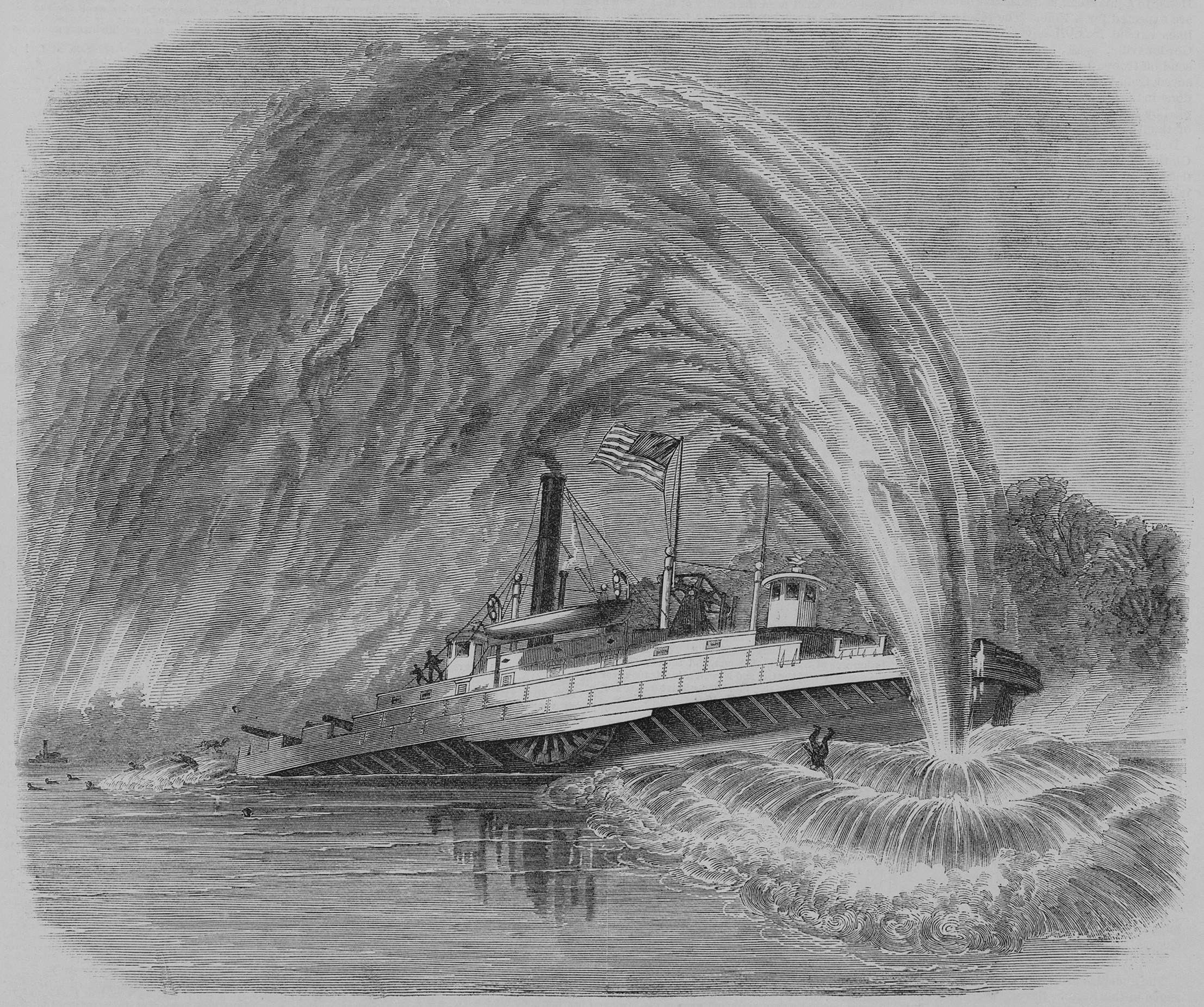
An illustration from Frank Leslie's Illustrated Newspaper depicting the explosion of the mine.

Commodore Barney – an armed, side-wheel ferry – was built in 1859 at New York City as the ferryboat Ethan Allen; purchased by the Navy on 2 October 1861; and commissioned later in the month. Ordered to take part in the expedition against Port Royal, South Carolina in October 1861, Commodore Barney was badly damaged during a storm en route and had to put into Baltimore, Maryland for repairs. She joined the North Atlantic Blockading Squadron in January 1862 and cruised along the Virginia and North Carolina coasts until June. She took part in the seizure of Roanoke Island (7–9 February 1862), the Chowan River reconnaissance (18–20 February) and the capture of New Bern, North Carolina, (13–14 March). From July 1862-March 1864, she operated out of Hampton Roads, Virginia in the rivers of Virginia. Commodore Barney cooperated with the Union Army in defending Suffolk, Virginia from 11 April – 4 May 1862 and on the Pamunkey River expedition from 24 to 29 June 1863.

From 4–7 August 1863, she took part in the expedition up the James River during which a torpedo (mine) exploded under her bow causing damage to her engine. which also made 20 crewmembers to go overboard and two of whom drowned. She continued the expedition in tow. On 13–14 April 1864, she joined in the James-Nansemond Rivers expedition. After spending the period from 22 April-27 June in the North Carolina sounds she returned to cruise the James and Appomattox Rivers until ordered to Washington Navy Yard on 5 May 1865. She was sold there on 20 July.
