= USS Hazelwood (DD-107) =

Wickes-class destroyer

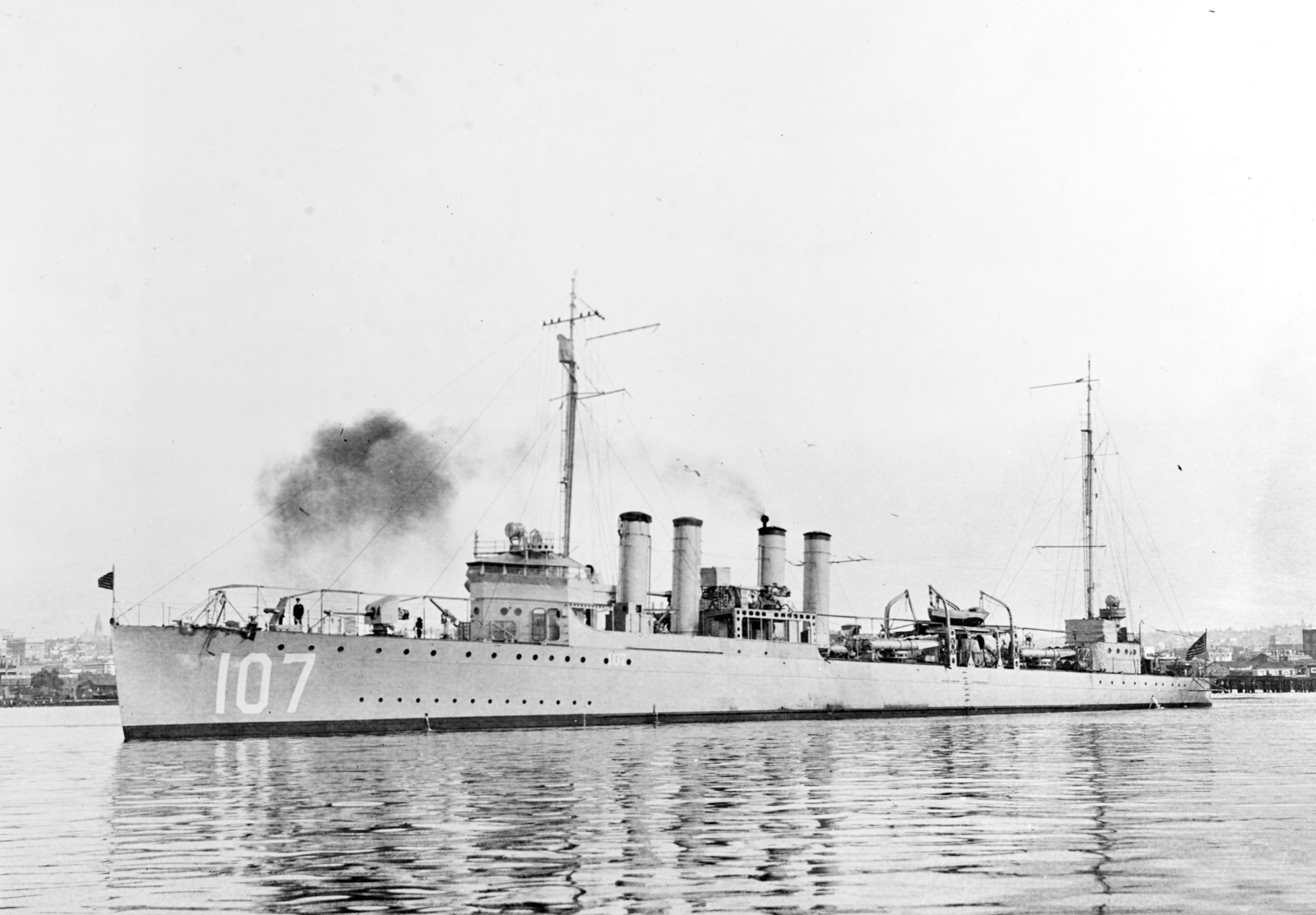
- USS Hazelwood (DD-107)

History

United States
- Name: USS Hazelwood
- Namesake: John Hazelwood
- Builder: Union Iron Works, San Francisco, California
- Laid down: 24 December 1917
- Launched: 22 June 1918
- Commissioned: 20 February 1919
- Decommissioned: 7 July 1922
- Recommissioned: 1 April 1925
- Decommissioned: 15 November 1930
- Fate: Sold for scrapping 30 August 1935

General characteristics
- Class & type: Wickes-class destroyer
- Displacement: 1,202–1,208 long tons (1,221–1,227 t) (standard); 1,295–1,322 long tons (1,316–1,343 t) (deep load)
- Length: 314 ft 4 in (95.8 m)
- Beam: 30 ft 11 in (9.42 m)
- Draught: 9 ft 10 in (3.0 m)
- Installed power: 27,000 shp (20,000 kW); 4 water-tube boilers
- Propulsion: 2 shafts, 2 steam turbines
- Speed: 35 knots (65 km/h; 40 mph) (design)
- Range: 2,500 nautical miles (4,600 km; 2,900 mi) at 20 knots (37 km/h; 23 mph) (design)
- Complement: 6 officers, 108 enlisted men
- Armament: 4 × single 4-inch (102 mm) guns; 2 × single 1-pounder AA guns; 4 × triple 21 inch (533 mm) torpedo tubes; 2 × depth charge rails

USS Hazelwood (DD-107) was a Wickes-class destroyer built for the United States Navy during World War I.

== Description ==
The Wickes class was an improved and faster version of the preceding Caldwell-class. Two different designs were prepared to the same specification that mainly differed in the turbines and boilers used. The ships built to the Bethlehem Steel design, built in the Fore River and Union Iron Works shipyards, mostly used Yarrow boilers that deteriorated badly during service and were mostly scrapped during the 1930s. The ships displaced 1,202–1,208 long tons (1,221–1,227 t) at standard load and 1,295–1,322 long tons (1,316–1,343 t) at deep load. They had an overall length of 314 feet 4 inches (95.8 m), a beam of 30 feet 11 inches (9.4 m) and a draught of 9 feet 10 inches (3.0 m). They had a crew of 6 officers and 108 enlisted men.

Performance differed radically between the ships of the class, often due to poor workmanship. The Wickes class was powered by two steam turbines, each driving one propeller shaft, using steam provided by four water-tube boilers. The turbines were designed to produce a total of 27,000 shaft horsepower (20,000 kW) intended to reach a speed of 35 knots (65 km/h; 40 mph). The ships carried 225 long tons (229 t) of fuel oil which was intended gave them a range of 2,500 nautical miles (4,600 km; 2,900 mi) at 20 knots (37 km/h; 23 mph).

The ships were armed with four 4-inch (102 mm) guns in single mounts and were fitted with two 1-pounder guns for anti-aircraft defense. Their primary weapon, though, was their torpedo battery of a dozen 21 inch (533 mm) torpedo tubes in four triple mounts. In many ships a shortage of 1-pounders caused them to be replaced by 3-inch (76 mm) anti-aircraft (AA) guns. They also carried a pair of depth charge rails. A "Y-gun" depth charge thrower was added to many ships.

== Construction and career ==
Hazelwood, named in honor of John Hazelwood, was laid down 24 December 1917 by Union Iron Works, San Francisco, California, launched 22 June 1918 and commissioned 20 February 1919. Following shakedown and a voyage to Norfolk for supplies, Hazelwood departed New York for the Mediterranean 15 April 1919. Reaching Gibraltar 9 May, she participated in training and served as escort to Arizona (BB-39). After patrolling the Mediterranean, she departed Malta 28 July and arrived New York 13 August. Next day she got underway for her new home waters, the Pacific. Sailing via Cuba and Panama, she arrived at San Francisco 5 September. After operations along the West Coast, she decommissioned at San Diego 7 July 1922.

Hazelwood recommissioned 1 April 1925, and participated in training and readiness exercises with units of the Pacific Fleet for the next five years. She decommissioned again 15 November 1930, at San Diego, was sold to Learner and Rosenthal 30 August 1935, and was scrapped 14 April 1935.
