= Sampson incident =

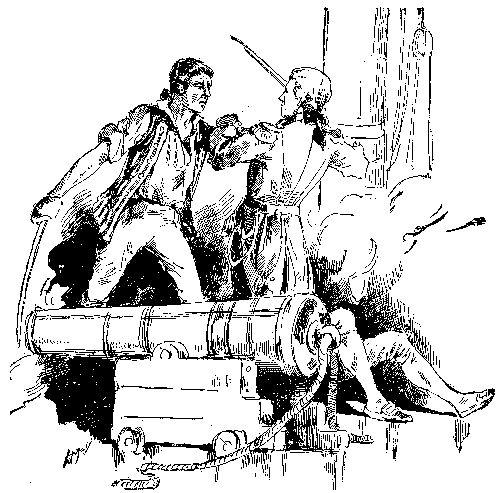
- "Barney Regains His Ship" by Willis J. Abbot.
| Date | July 12–20, 1793 |
| Location | West Indies, Caribbean Sea |
| Result | Successful recapture of the American ship. |

Belligerents
| United States | Great Britain |

Commanders and leaders
| Joshua Barney | unknown |

Strength
| 4 sailors | 11 sailors |

Casualties and losses
| none | 2 wounded |

The Sampson incident occurred in July 1793 when the American merchant ship Sampson was seized by British privateers in the West Indies. Following a week of capture, the American prisoners revolted against the British and retook control of their ship.

== Incident ==
The Sampson was a ship rigged vessel under the command of Captain Joshua Barney, a famous United States Navy officer who served in the American Revolutionary War and the War of 1812. On July 12, 1793, the Sampson was trading in the Caribbean Sea when three British privateers surrounded her. The British put a boarding party on the American ship and they took several prisoners, leaving only the ship's carpenter, boatswain, and the cook on board. Captain Barney was taken to one of the privateers while the British searched the ship, stealing valuable property in the process. A few iron chests were found on the Sampson and it contained about $18,000. The British thought the chests were suspicious, so they told Captain Barney that they would release him if he gave up the money. Barney refused to tolerate the robbery, so he was sent back to the Sampson as a prisoner under guard by eleven armed sailors. They were then to follow the British into the port of New Providence. Later that day, Barney was capable of communicating with the remaining three men on the Sampson, who told him that they had hidden weapons and would retake the ship upon orders. Barney was not ready yet, though, but after a week of listening to the insulting British privateersmen, the Americans decided to act. Captain Barney had concealed a blunderbuss and a broadside sword in his clothing, and the three others managed to hide a musket and a bayonet each in the berths. So at noon on July 20 the Americans executed their plan. That day was rainy and squally, which meant the prize crew was busy navigating while the three British officers were dining on the quarterdeck near the main mast.

Barney picked up his sword, cocked the blunderbuss, and with the boatswain and the carpenter he approached the officers. One of them immediately stood up and tried to wrestle the weapon out of Barney's had, but the gun went off and struck the Englishman in his right arm. A second officer then went for Barney, but he quickly forced him back with his sword and wounded the man in the head. The rest of the prize crew then went below for their weapons, but before they reemerged on deck the boatswain and the carpenter had disarmed them. The Americans were now in control of the ship, and the Britons vowed to do whatever Barney ordered. One by one the men were allowed on deck and their arms were surrendered and thrown over the side. Sampson's crew then set sail for Baltimore, Maryland, where they arrived several days later. The situation on the ship was very tense; Barney refused to sleep except during the day, in an armchair, with his sword and pistols close by. Barney was arrested for piracy in the West Indies by the British on January 2, 1794, by the frigate HMS Penelope. After spending some time as a prisoner, Barney was released, and later the British attempted to assassinate him in Port Royal, Jamaica.
