= Joshua Barney =

American naval officer (1759–1818)

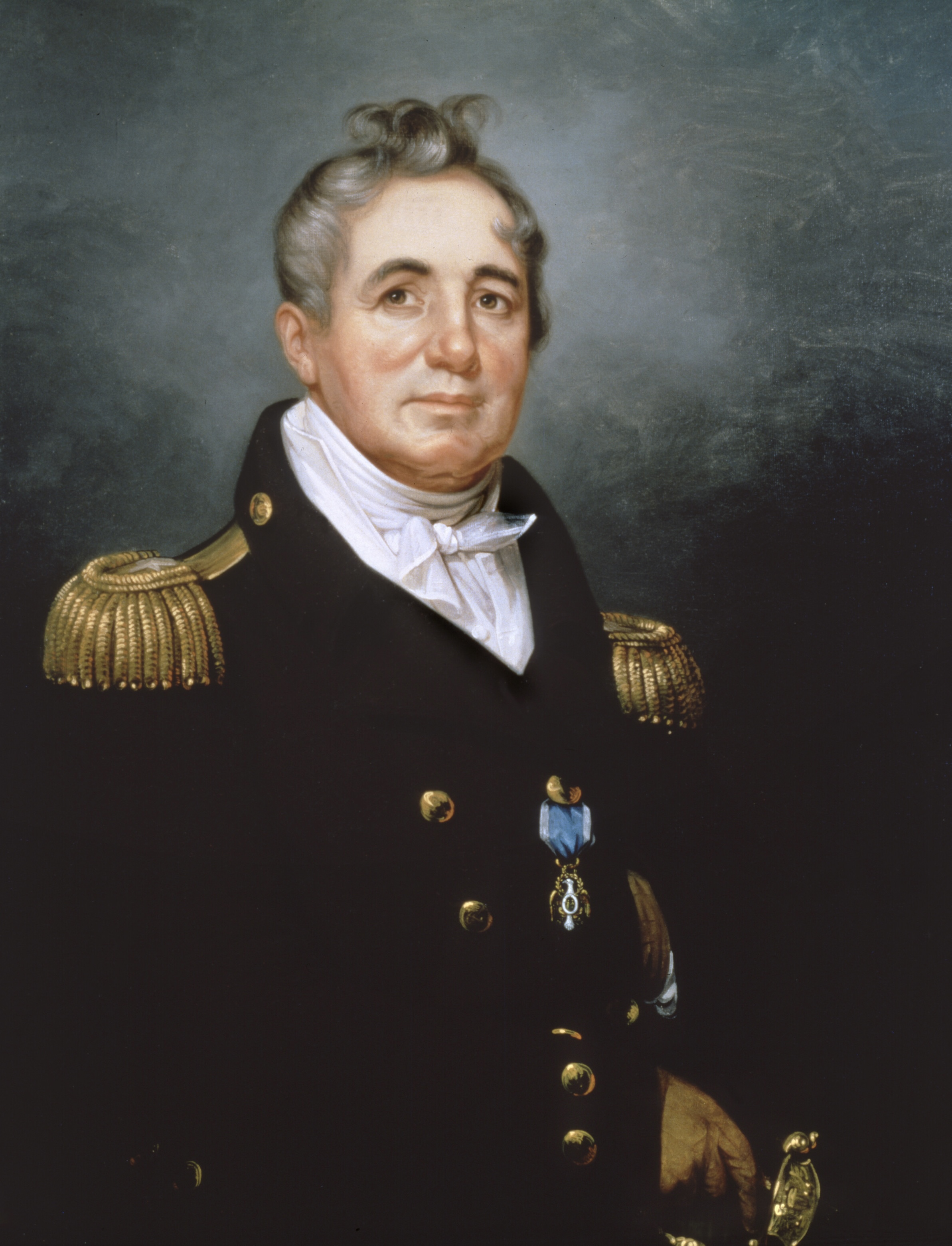
- Portrait by Rembrandt Peale, c. 1817
- Born: 6 July 1759; Baltimore, Maryland
- Died: 10 December 1818 (aged 59); Pittsburgh, Pennsylvania, U.S.
- Military career
- Allegiance: United States; France
- Branch: Continental Navy; French Navy; United States Navy
- Service years: 1776–1792/1802-1818 (U.S.); 1792-1802 (France)
- Rank: Commodore (U.S.); Captain (France)
- Conflicts: American Revolutionary War; Battle of Delaware Bay; Sampson Incident; War of 1812; Chesapeake Bay Flotilla; Battle of Bladensburg (WIA)

Joshua Barney (6 July 1759 – 1 December 1818) was an American naval officer who served in the Continental Navy during the American Revolutionary War and in the French Navy during the French Revolutionary Wars. He later achieved the rank of commodore in the United States Navy and served in the War of 1812.

== Early life and family ==
Barney was born in Baltimore on July 6, 1759. He went to sea at the age of 12 in 1771. In 1775, he served as second-in-command to his brother-in-law aboard a merchant ship bound for Europe; after his brother-in-law died, he assumed command and sailed the ship to Nice.

Barney married twice, and had children with both wives. While on his way to Kentucky, where he planned to retire, he died in Pittsburgh. His widow Harriet settled in Kentucky with their three children. His grandson Joseph Nicholson Barney was also a United States Navy (and Confederate States Navy) officer.

== Revolutionary War ==
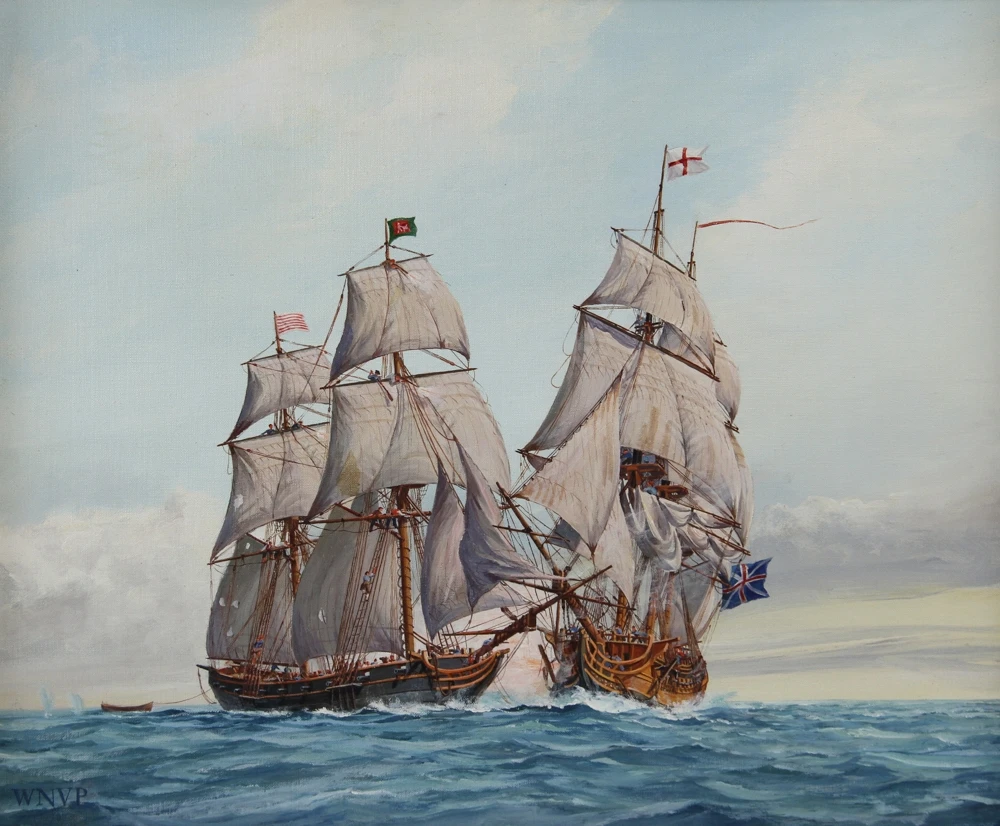
Painting of the Battle of Delaware Bay by William Nowland Van Powell

Barney served in the Continental Navy beginning in February 1776, as master's mate of Hornet where he took part in Commodore Esek Hopkins's raid on New Providence. Later he served aboard Wasp and was promoted to the rank of lieutenant for gallantry in the action between Wasp and a British brig, the tender Betsey. While serving on Andrew Doria he took a prominent part in the defense of the Delaware River.

Barney was taken prisoner and exchanged several times. In 1779, he was again taken prisoner and imprisoned in Old Mill Prison, Plymouth, England, until his escape in 1781. He wrote an account of this in The Memoirs of Commodore Barney, published in Boston in 1832.

=== Battle of Delaware Bay ===
In April 1782, he was put in command of the Pennsylvania ship Hyder Ally, in which he captured the British sloop-of-war HMS General Monk in the Battle of Delaware Bay. He was given command of Monk (renamed General Washington) and sailed for France with dispatches for Benjamin Franklin, returning with news that peace had been declared. The ship also carried a party of Austrian naturalists under the leadership of Franz Jozef Maerter and including Franz Boos.

At the conclusion of the war, Barney was admitted as an original member of the Society of the Cincinnati in the state of Pennsylvania and later transferred to the Maryland Society.

Barney then joined the French Navy, where he was made commander of a squadron.

== Service in the French Navy ==
Between 1796 and 1802 Joshua Barney served as a captain in the French Navy. Between 7 June and 17 October 1796 he was captain of the French frigate Harmonie. He sailed her from Rochefort to ferry weapons and ammunition to Cap-Français. He then cruised in the Caribbean between Havana and Chesapeake Bay, returning to Cap-Français on 17 October.

== War of 1812 ==
=== Chesapeake Bay Flotilla ===
At the outbreak of the War of 1812, after a successful but unprofitable privateering cruise as commander of the Baltimore schooner Rossie, in which he captured the British packet ship Princess Amelia, Barney entered the US Navy as a captain, and commanded the Chesapeake Bay Flotilla, a fleet of gunboats defending the Chesapeake Bay. He authored the plan to defend the Chesapeake, which was submitted to Secretary of the Navy, William Jones and accepted on August 20, 1813. The plan consisted of using a flotilla of shallow-draft barges equipped with a large gun each to launch offensive operations against British forces before retreating to the safety of shoal waters abundant in the Chesapeake region. Barney was commissioned as a captain in the United States Flotilla Service on 25 April 1814.

On 1 June 1814, Barney's flotilla, led by his flagship, the 49-foot (15 m) sloop-rigged, self-propelled floating battery USS Scorpion, mounting two long guns and two carronades, were coming down the Chesapeake Bay when they encountered the 12-gun schooner HMS St Lawrence (the former Baltimore privateer Atlas), and boats from the 74-gun third-rates HMS Dragon and HMS Albion near St. Jerome Creek. The flotilla pursued St Lawrence and the boats until they could reach the protection of Dragon and Albion. The American flotilla then retreated into the Patuxent River where the British quickly blockaded it. The blockaders outnumbered Barney by 7:1, forcing the flotilla to retreat into St. Leonard's Creek on June 7. Three British warships, the 38-gun HMS Loire, 32-gun HMS Narcissus and 18-gun HMS Jasseur blockaded the mouth of the creek. The creek was too shallow for the British warships to enter, and an impasse emerged as the flotilla was too heavily armed for a cutting-out party to capture it.

Captain Robert Barrie, who commanded Dragon, sought to flush Barney's flotilla out by forcing it to come to the assistance of nearby settlements and slave plantations on the Patuxent. Under his direction, the blockaders proceeded to raid nearby towns, villages, and plantations, sacking or burning the settlements of Calverton, Huntingtown, Prince Frederick, Benedict and Lower Marlboro. On 26 June, after the arrival of American troops under US Army Colonel Decius Wadsworth and US Marine Corps Captain Samuel Miller, Barney attempted a breakout. A simultaneous attack from land and sea on the blockading frigates at the mouth of St. Leonard's creek allowed the flotilla to move out of the creek and upriver to Benedict, though Barney had to scuttle gunboats No. 137 and 138 in the creek. The British entered the then-abandoned creek and burned St. Leonard.

British forces under Admiral Sir Alexander Cochrane then moved up the Patuxent, preparing for a landing at Benedict. Concerned that Barney's flotilla could fall into British hands, Secretary of the Navy Jones ordered Barney to take the flotilla as far up the Patuxent as possible, to Queen Anne, and scuttle it if he sighted British forces. Leaving his barges with a skeleton crew under the command of Lieutenant Solomon Kireo Frazier to handle any scuttling of the flotilla, Barney took the majority of his men to join the American army commanded by General William H. Winder where they participated in the Battle of Bladensburg. Frazier subsequently scuttled all but one of the vessels of the Chesapeake Bay Flotilla, which the British captured.

=== Battle of Bladensburg ===
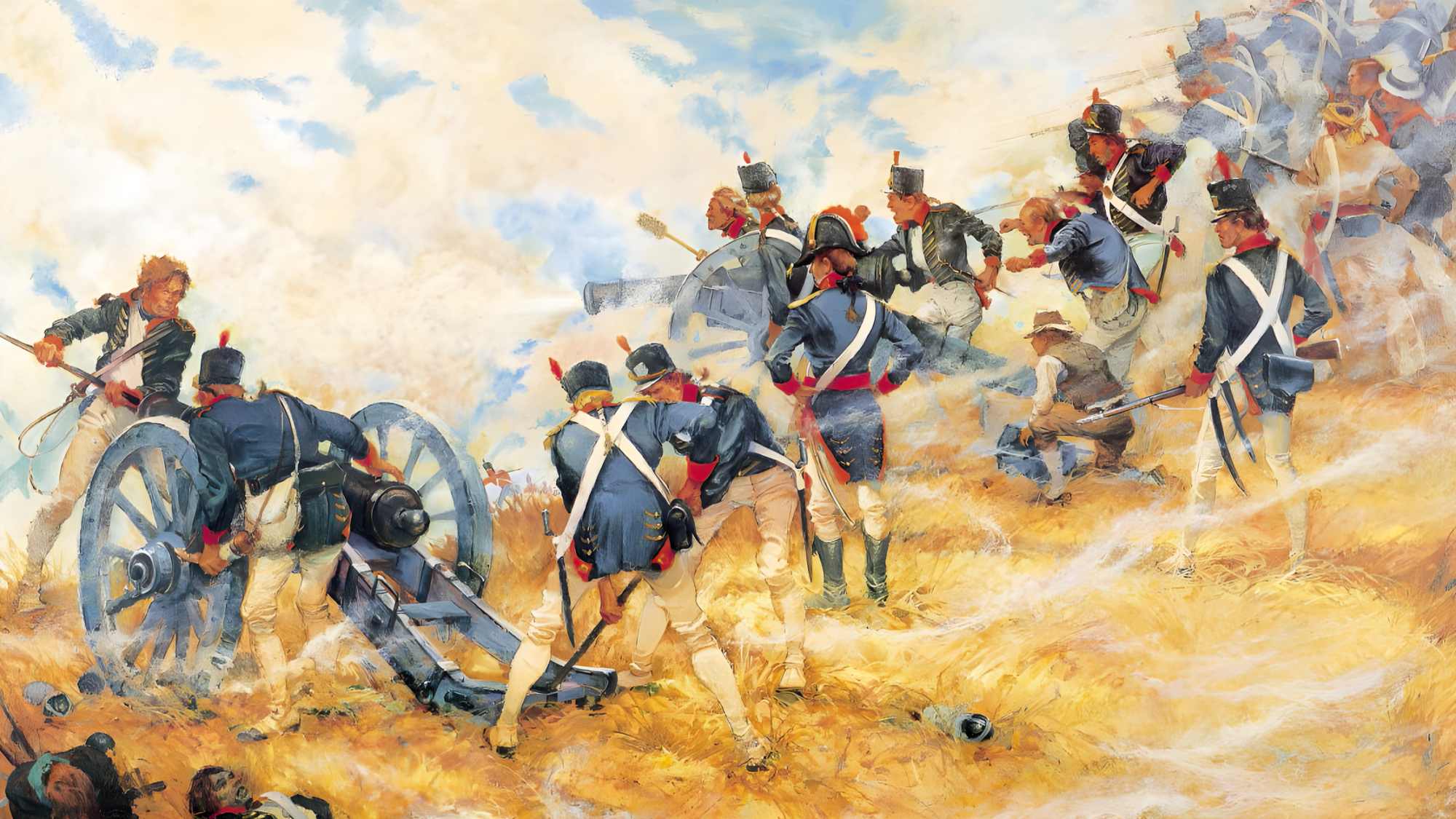
Barney (wearing bicorne) directing American artillery at Bladensburg

At the Battle of Bladensburg, Barney and 360 sailors and 120 Marines defended the national capital—fighting against the British hand-to-hand with cutlasses and pikes. The battle raged for four hours, but the British eventually defeated the Americans. The defenders were forced to fall back after nearly being cut off, and the British went on to burn the Capitol and White House. Barney was severely wounded, receiving a bullet deep in his thigh that could never be removed.

During the battle, President James Madison personally directed the Marines led by Barney. (Prior to the battle, Madison had narrowly avoided capture.) This battle is one of only two instances of a sitting president exercising direct battlefield authority as Commander-in-Chief, the other being when George Washington personally crushed the Whiskey Rebellion.

== Death ==
Commodore Barney died in Pittsburgh, Pennsylvania on 10 December 1818 en route to Kentucky, from complications related to the wound he received at the Battle of Bladensburg. His remains rest in Allegheny Cemetery in Pittsburgh.

== Namesakes and honors ==
Four US Navy ships were named for him:

- USS Commodore Barney, an American Civil War ferryboat
- USS Barney (TB-25), a torpedo boat built at the Bath Iron Works, Bath, Maine in 1900
- USS Barney (DD-149), a Wickes-class destroyer, built at Cramps' Shipbuilding in Philadelphia, launched 5 September 1918
- USS Barney (DDG-6) was a Charles F. Adams-class guided missile destroyer, built at New York Shipbuilding in Camden, New Jersey, launched 10 Dec 1960.

In Washington, D.C., both Barney Circle (a neighborhood on Pennsylvania Avenue, SE) and Commodore Joshua Barney Drive, NE, are named in his honor.

Barney Square, the main drill area between the barracks facilities at the United States Merchant Marine Academy is named in honor of this American Merchant Mariner turned Naval Hero.

There are several sites in Prince George's County that commemorate Commodore Barney. A replica of a gunboat of Barney's Chesapeake Bay Flotilla today sits in Bladensburg Waterside Park, the Battle of Bladensburg Monument, and Fort Lincoln Cemetery hosts the Battle of Bladensburg Commodore Joshua Barney Monument.

== Exhibits ==
The Maryland Historical Society was granted an antique pistol with a folding bayonet, a spyglass and the journal of War of 1812 from descendant Anne Helm Galvin for the exhibit "In Full Glory Reflected: Maryland in the War of 1812."

== See also ==
- Commodore Joshua Barney House
- Bibliography of early American naval history**
- Joshua Barney in Guilford and Savage, Maryland
