= Jeremiah Olney =

Continental Army officer

- Born: 1749; Rhode Island
- Died: 10 November 1812 (aged 62–63) Providence, Rhode Island, US
- Allegiance: United States
- Branch: Continental Army
- Service years: 1775–1783
- Rank: Colonel
- Conflicts: American Revolutionary War: Siege of Boston (1775–1776); Battle of Red Bank (1777); Battle of Monmouth (1778); Battle of Springfield (1780); Siege of Yorktown (1781)
- Other work: Society of the Cincinnati

Colonel Jeremiah Olney (1749 – 10 November 1812) was a Continental Army officer. Born into an old family from Rhode Island, he formed a company of infantry from that state at the start of the American Revolutionary War. After serving as captain in 1776, he was promoted to lieutenant colonel at the beginning of 1777. As second-in-command of the 2nd Rhode Island Regiment, he fought at Red Bank. After its commander was wounded early in the action, he led Varnum's brigade in bitter fighting at Monmouth in June 1778.

In 1780 he married the governor's daughter, Sarah Cooke. Later that year he led his regiment in action at Springfield. He moved south in 1781 to lead the Rhode Island Regiment at Yorktown. After the war he helped found the Rhode Island chapter of the Society of the Cincinnati. He supported the Federalist Party and held various civil offices. After helping to establish the Providence Theater, he defended it against accusations of immorality. He also invested in farms, turnpikes, shipping, and other business ventures.

== Early career ==
Olney was born in 1749 at Providence, Rhode Island to parents Joseph Olney (1706–1777) and Elizabeth T. Mawney (b. 1714). He was one of Joseph's 12 children and was sibling to a twin named Marcy. Olney descended from Thomas Olney, a minister of the First Baptist Church in America and one of the founders of the Rhode Island colony. Olney at first declined a captain's commission in the Rhode Island Army of Observation. Later he assumed command of a company of infantry in Colonel Daniel Hitchcock's Rhode Island Regiment. He held a captain's commission in the regiment beginning on 3 May 1775. He remained a captain during the entire year of 1776 when the unit was called the 11th Continental Regiment.

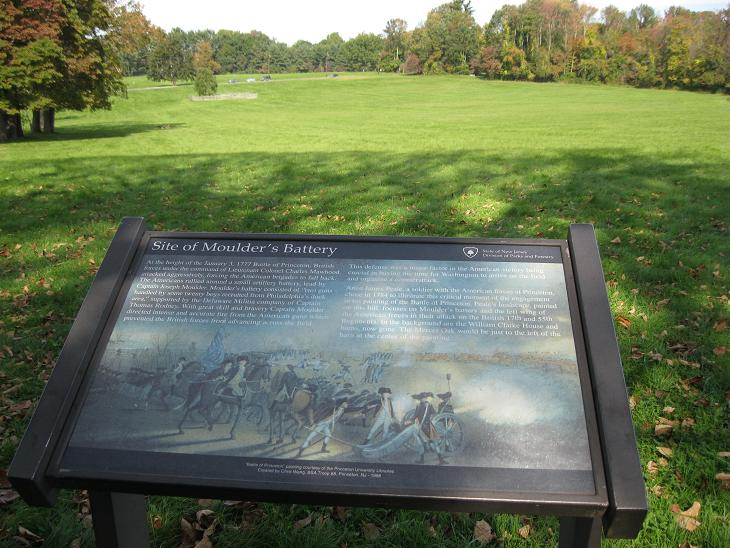
Site of Joseph Moulder's battery at Princeton. Hitchcock's brigade was to the right of this position.

The sources stated only that Olney fought in four battles (Red Bank, Monmouth, Springfield, and Yorktown). However, one source noted that, "he participated in many engagements", so it is likely that he fought in other battles as well. During the period May 1775 to January 1777, the regiment served in the Siege of Boston and the New York and New Jersey Campaign. At the time of the Battle of Long Island in August 1776, John Nixon's brigade of Nathanael Greene's division included Hitchcock's Regiment with a strength of 368 men.

The regiment, renamed the 2nd Rhode Island Regiment on 1 January 1777, fought at the Battle of the Assunpink Creek on 2 January 1777 where they held the lower ford on the left flank. In this position, they repelled the attacks of the British light infantry and Hessian jägers. The regiment, which numbered only 120 men, belonged to a 352-man brigade commanded by Hitchcock. The 2nd Regiment participated in the Battle of Princeton the following day. After Charles Mawhood's initial attack routed Hugh Mercer's advance guard, George Washington rallied the Americans on the hill where Thomas Clark's house still stands. Hitchcock's small brigade joined with forces under Edward Hand, Thomas Mifflin, John Cadwalader, and others to defeat Mawhood. Hitchcock and Hand probably deployed on the American right flank.

Hitchcock died of pneumonia on 13 January 1777 at Morristown, New Jersey. That day, Olney was promoted lieutenant colonel of the 2nd Rhode Island. Israel Angell became colonel while Simeon Thayer became major. The Rhode Island Assembly voted to recruit two full regiments when the terms of enlistment of the 1776 units ran out. By February only 50 men had enrolled but recruiting picked up and 400 men had enlisted by March. Another 1,800 state troops contained the British foothold at Newport. Together with the 1st Rhode Island Regiment, 4th Connecticut Regiment, and 8th Connecticut Regiment, the 2nd Regiment served in Brigadier General James Mitchell Varnum's brigade. The 2nd Regiment transferred to the Highlands Department on 12 March 1777 and back to the main army on 14 September. Under the command of Varnum, the 2nd Regiment arrived at Red Bank, New Jersey on 18 October.

== Red Bank ==
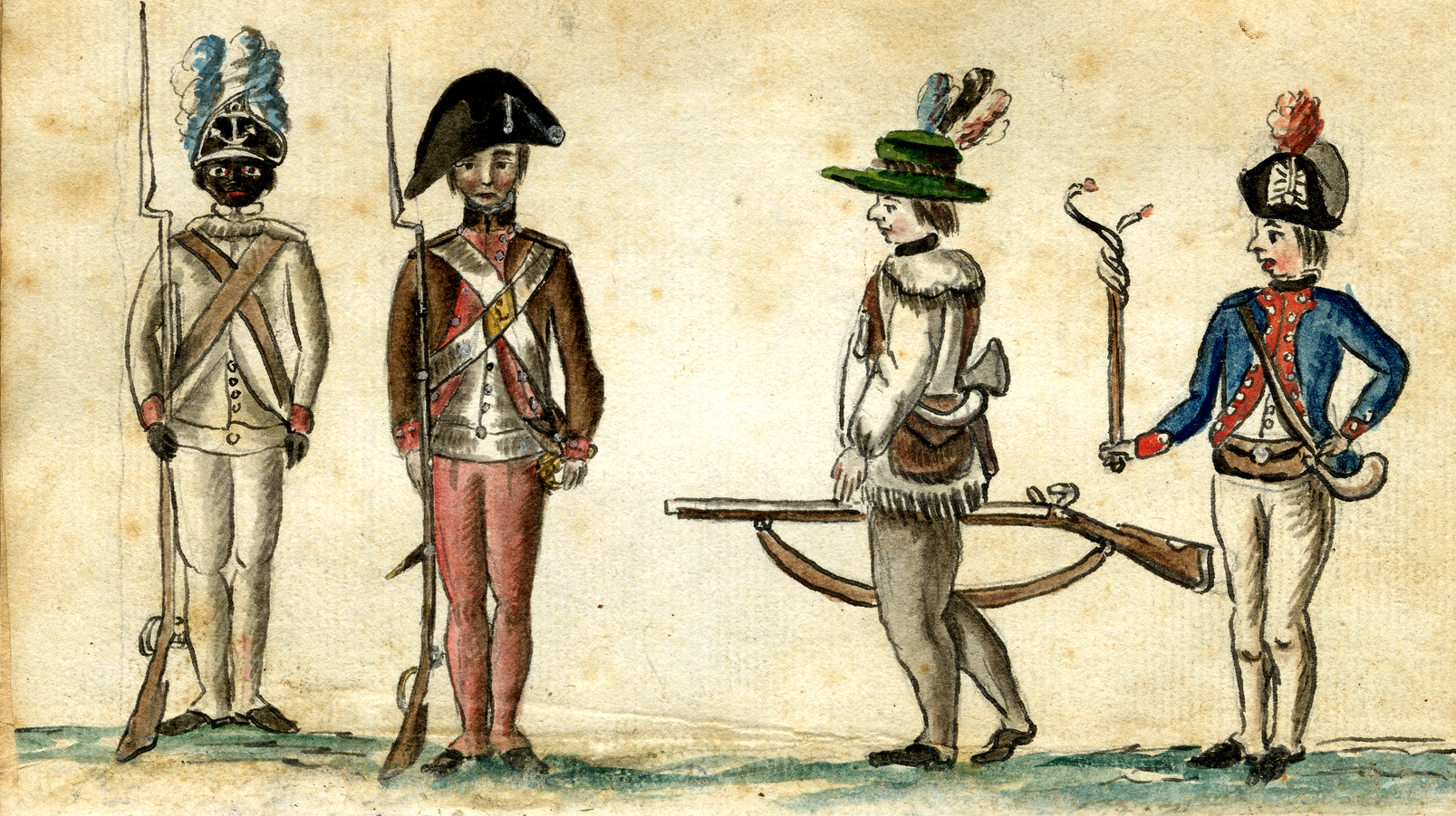
The African-American soldier on the left is from the Rhode Island Regiment in 1781.

On 22 October 1777 Olney fought at the Battle of Red Bank where 500 Americans successfully defended Fort Mercer against the attack of Carl von Donop's 2,000 Hessian soldiers. Donop sent British Major Charles Stuart under a flag of truce to demand the fort's surrender. The American commander, Colonel Christopher Greene of the 1st Rhode Island sent Lieutenant Colonel Olney of the 2nd Regiment to receive the message. Stuart addressed Olney in a tone loud enough for the fort's garrison to hear. He said, "The King of England orders his rebellious subjects to lay down their arms, and they are warned that if they stand battle, no quarter will be given". When Stuart insisted on seeing the fort's commander, Olney replied that they would, "defend the fort unto the last". Stuart pressed further and Olney remarked that, "seeing Colonel Greene was altogether needless," because he would defend the fort "as long as he had a man and as to mercy it was neither sought nor expected". Hessian officer Johann von Ewald recalled Olney shouting, "By God no!" in reply to the demand for surrender. Later that afternoon, the Hessians tried to rush the fort but were slaughtered by American gunfire. An eyewitness reported that during the fight, Olney used the flat of his sword on soldiers who fired over the parapet without aiming their muskets. American losses in the engagement were 14 killed, 21 wounded, and one captured while the Hessians suffered 90 killed, 227 wounded, and 69 missing. Donop was mortally wounded.

In January 1778, the enlisted men of the 1st Rhode Island were transferred to the 2nd Rhode Island. The officers and non commissioned officers of the 1st went back to the state to recruit. The regiment was filled up by enrolling enslaved blacks whose owners were compensated by the state. The RI General Assembly proclaimed, "Every slave, so enlisting, shall, upon his passing muster before Col. Christopher Greene, be immediately discharged from the service of his master or mistress, and be absolutely FREE as though he had never been encumbered with any Kind of Servitude or Slavery". No other state followed this course of action. Though every "negro, mulatto, or Indian man-slave" was eligible to enroll and the bounty was the same as for white men, fewer than 200 signed up. Alarmed at the cost, the Rhode Island Assembly stopped recruiting slaves on 10 June 1778.

== Monmouth ==
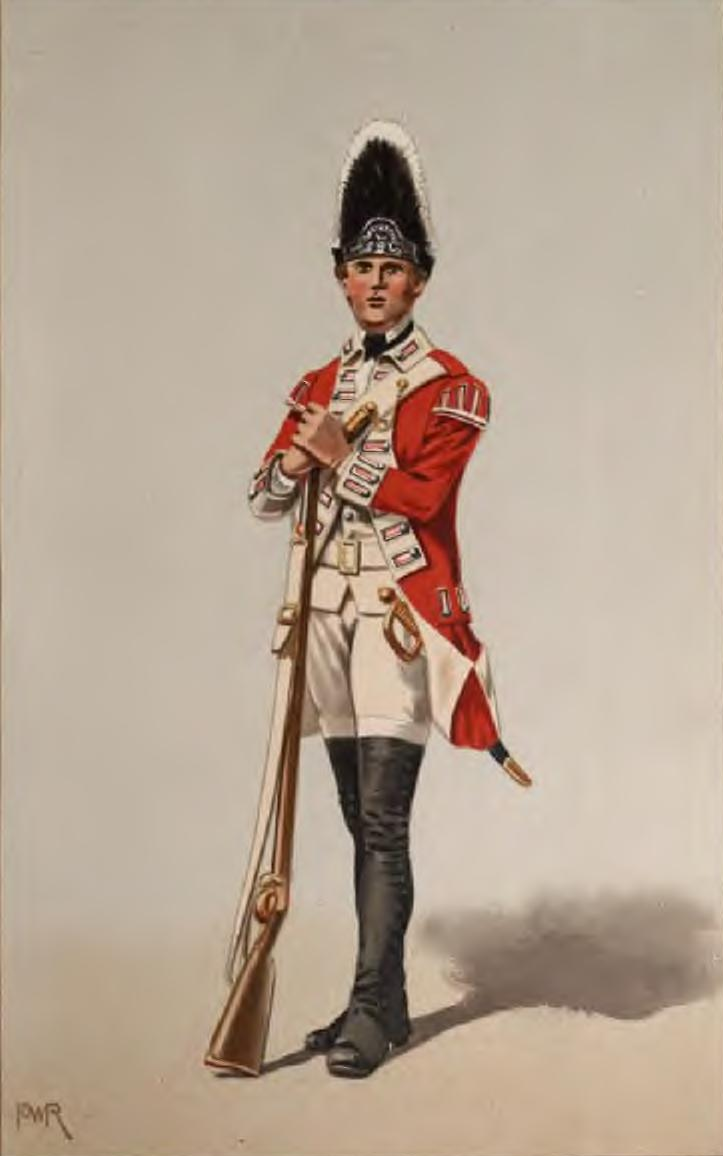
Olney's brigade faced British grenadiers at Monmouth. Grenadier, 40th Foot.

At the Battle of Monmouth on 28 June 1778, Olney led the two consolidated Rhode Island regiments in Varnum's brigade which was temporarily commanded by Colonel John Durkee. Part of Charles Lee's advanced guard, this 300-man unit also included the converged 4th and 8th Connecticut Regiment plus two attached guns from Captain David Cook's company of the 3rd Continental Artillery Regiment. As the American units came into contact with the British rear guard, confused fighting broke out. Some British light dragoons attacked a party of militia horsemen but were driven off by volleys from infantry detachments under Richard Butler and Henry Jackson. Butler and Jackson moved forward but came under fire from two British cannons and pulled back into some woods. Thinking Butler and Jackson were enemy forces, Lee sent Durkee's soldiers to attack them. The matter was quickly straightened out and Durkee was shifted to support two guns commanded by Eleazer Oswald on the left flank. At this time Durkee was wounded and Olney succeeded him in command of Varnum's brigade.

Soon after this, Lee became aware that British commander Henry Clinton assembled 6,000 troops nearby, many more than he had suspected. Oswald withdrew his two guns because they were out of round shot and the crews were unable to bring up their ammunition wagon. As Clinton's troops moved forward, Lee lost control of his division. Some American units began retreating and other units, seeing their fellow troops withdraw, fell back as well. Observing his troops withdrawing without orders, Lee gave orders for a general retreat. Oswald, Lee's artillery chief, massed 10 cannon to cover the movement.

Pressed by British columns, the retreat continued and Oswald dissolved his large battery, returning Olney's two guns as well as two guns belonging to William Maxwell's New Jersey Brigade. Two more guns were sent to the rear. Washington appeared on the scene and relieved Lee of his command. However, he soon relented and permitted Lee to organize a holding action while he deployed the American main body into a defensive line. Lee placed Olney's brigade behind a north-south hedgerow with two of Oswald's guns in support on their right. Oswald's other two guns took a position where they could cover the detachments of Nathaniel Ramsey and Walter Stewart on the left flank. Lee directed Henry Livingston Jr. to protect Oswald's two guns on the right, but instead he took position behind the hedgerow on Olney's left.

After a sharp struggle with the British foot guards, Stewart and Ramsey were driven out of the woods on the left. Both Stewart and Ramsey fell wounded and Ramsey was captured by some troopers of the 16th Light Dragoons. Next, the dragoons attacked the hedgerow but were repelled by Olney and Livingston. Clinton yelled for the 2nd Grenadier Battalion and half of the 1st Grenadier Battalion to attack the hedgerow. Charging into intense musketry and case shot, the elite grenadiers broke into the hedgerow position. Oswald pulled his guns out just in time, covered by Olney's men. In the melee, 16 grenadiers found themselves surrounded by Olney's troops, but the Americans were so bent on retreating that they paid no heed to their enemies. During the violent struggle, the commander of the 2nd Grenadiers Henry Monckton was killed. After this action, which occurred about noon, Olney joined the rest of Lee's division which was reorganizing in the rear of Washington's main body.

== Later career ==
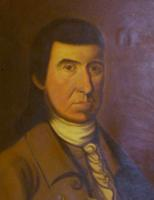
Olney's father-in-law, Governor Nicholas Cooke

On 26 April 1780 Olney wed Sarah Cooke (1755–1843), daughter of Governor Nicholas Cooke. He fought at the Battle of Springfield on 23 June 1780. In the combat, the 2nd Rhode Island under Angell held up Wilhelm von Knyphausen's greatly superior Anglo-Hessian force at the Springfield Bridge for 40 minutes before withdrawing in good order. The new bride received a mistaken report that her husband had been killed, causing her to have a nervous breakdown. Her condition lasted a few years after which she recovered and outlived her husband by over 30 years. The couple had only one child, Mary Timmins Olney (1799–1878) who married Samuel Carr (1795–1832) and had three sons.

The 1st and 2nd Regiments were merged on 1 January 1781 and the new unit was named the Rhode Island Regiment. Olney transferred to the new regiment in January and assumed command of the regiment on 14 May 1781 after Colonel Greene and Major Ebenezer Flagg were killed by Tories at the Battle of Pine's Bridge on the Croton River in Westchester County, New York that same day. When the regiment began its march south to Virginia, Olney was listed as the commander of 360 officers and men. At the Siege of Yorktown in October 1781, his regiment belonged to Colonel Elias Dayton's Brigade of Benjamin Lincoln's Division. Olney was brevetted as a colonel on 30 September 1783 in recognition of his long and faithful service in the Continental Army.

At the end of the war Olney resigned his commission. He was one of the few individuals who served in the Continental Army for the entirety of its existence. He was a founding member of the Rhode Island Society of the Cincinnati and served as its treasurer and later as its president from 1800 until his death in 1812.

== Post war ==
After the war, Colonel Olney served as Distributor of Pensions for Rhode Island's invalid soldiers. During the war he paid his own money for supplies and equipment for his regiment. After the war he had difficulty getting reimbursed for these expenses.

A staunch member of the Federalist Party, he argued in favor of adoption of the United States Constitution. For his political support, he was rewarded by being appointed in 1790 to the lucrative position of Customs Collector for the Port of Providence by President George Washington. He retained this position despite attempts to oust him in 1793 and 1802 for too-rigorous enforcement of duties and fees. The Embargo Act of 1807 caused a large increase in smuggling and he resigned his post in 1809.

Olney pursued numerous money-making ventures after the war. From 1784 until his death, he managed a farm in Rehoboth, Massachusetts that was owned by his in-laws. He sold water from "Jeremiah Olney's Fountain" to nearby homes in North Providence. He bought shares in turnpikes, sold framed prints, invested in property, and sold lottery tickets. He acted as the agent for some ex-officers who owned shares in a farm in Tiverton, Rhode Island. From 1806 to 1811 he owned shares in the Union Cotton Manufacturing Company. He invested in the trading voyages of his seafaring brother-in-law Joseph S. Cooke. He helped start the Providence Theatre and defended it in print against people who called it a bad influence. He died on 10 November 1812 and was buried in the North Burial Ground in Providence.

== Dates of rank ==
- Captain, Hitchcock's Regiment; 3 May 1775 - 31 December 1775
- Captain, 11th Continental Infantry; 1 January 1776 - 31 December 1776
- Lieutenant Colonel, 2nd Rhode Island Regiment; 13 January 1777 - 31 December 1780
- Lieutenant Colonel, Rhode Island Regiment; 1 January 1781 - 14 May 1781
- Lieutenant Colonel Commandant, Rhode Island Regiment; 14 May 1781 - 28 February 1783
- Lieutenant Colonel Commandant, Rhode Island Battalion; 1 March 1783 - 25 December 1783
- Brevet Colonel; September 23, 1783
