= Simeon Thayer =

American military officer

- Born: April 30, 1737; Mendon, Massachusetts, British America
- Died: October 14, 1800 (aged 63) Cumberland, Rhode Island, U.S.
- Allegiance: British America; United States
- Branch: British Army; Continental Army
- Service years: 1775–1781
- Rank: Major
- Conflicts: French and Indian War; Siege of Fort William Henry; American Revolutionary War; Battle of Quebec; Siege of Fort Mifflin; Battle of Barren Hill; Battle of Monmouth; Battle of Springfield
- Other work: Brigadier General of militia Society of the Cincinnati

Simeon Thayer (April 30, 1737 – October 14, 1800) fought in Rogers' Rangers during the French and Indian War and made a harrowing escape from French-allied Native Americans. At the outbreak of the American Revolutionary War, the Rhode Island assembly appointed him an officer. He quickly raised a company of soldiers and marched with them to the Siege of Boston. He and his men went on Benedict Arnold's expedition to Quebec during which time he kept a journal of his experiences. He fought at Quebec and was captured. After being paroled, he again served as an officer in the Continental Army. Simeon Thayer was a member of the Society of the Cincinnati of the State of Rhode Island.

Thayer distinguished himself at the Siege of Fort Mifflin in the autumn of 1777. For the period of four days he commanded the garrison until he was compelled to evacuate the fort by the tremendous bombardment. He fought at Barren Hill and Monmouth, where he was seriously wounded. He led his men in a clash at Springfield and retired from the army in 1781. Later, he served as a brigadier general of Rhode Island militia for three years. He was married three times and died after being thrown from a horse at age 63.

== Early life ==
Thayer was born in Mendon, Province of Massachusetts Bay on April 30, 1737, of parents David and Jane Keith Thayer. His eight brothers and sisters were named Jean, David, Susanna, George, Faithful, Jemima, Mary, and Elizabeth. As a young man, he served as an apprentice to a wig-maker.

In 1756 he volunteered for military service with a Rhode Island regiment. Soon after, he joined Colonel Fry's Massachusetts regiment and served in Rogers' Rangers during three separate clashes with French-allied Indians. He became a prisoner after the Siege of Fort William Henry on August 9, 1757. He survived the massacre of many British prisoners by pro-French Indians that followed the surrender. The captured troops were stripped of their weapons and much of their clothing and made to march from the fort. A tomahawk-armed Native American seized Thayer by his under-waistcoat and began dragging him toward a swamp. The garment tore off, allowing Thayer to flee his captor. He soon joined another prisoner and the two were pursued by an Indian who tomahawked his companion to death. Thayer began sprinting and reached Fort Edward in safety. The effort of running a great distance on a hot day impaired his health and rendered him unfit for service for the rest of the French and Indian War.

In 1761, Thayer, now employed as a wig-maker in Providence, Rhode Island, bought a piece of property and was married. When trouble with Great Britain started in 1772, he joined a grenadier company in the local militia.

== American Revolution ==
=== Quebec ===
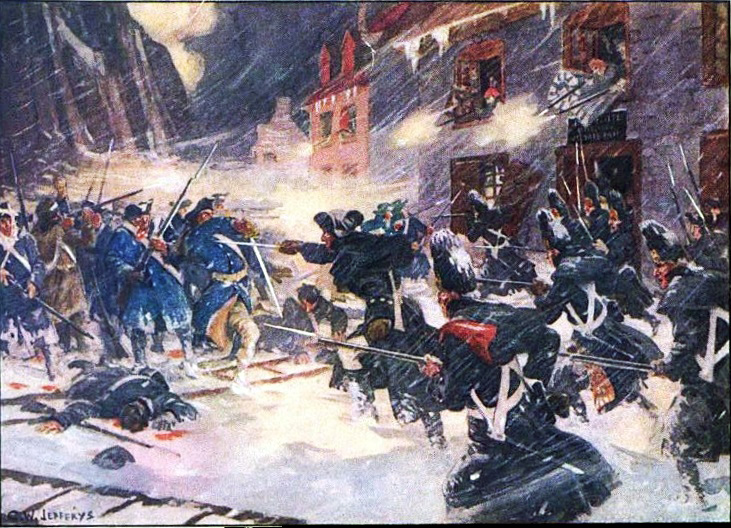
Thayer was captured at the Battle of Quebec.

When war broke out, the Rhode Island general assembly commissioned him a captain in May 1775. He personally enlisted his company to full strength and marched for Boston on May 19, arriving there two days later. These were the first Rhode Island troops to arrive in Boston. His company became part of Colonel Daniel Hitchcock's regiment in the Army of Observation.

A muster roll from September 10, 1775, showed that Thayer's company consisted of two lieutenants, four sergeants, four corporals, a fifer, and 79 privates. That month his company was selected to join Benedict Arnold's expedition to Quebec. On the morning of December 31, 1775, the Americans opened the Battle of Quebec by attacking the city. The main column under Colonel Benedict Arnold and Lieutenant Colonel Christopher Greene was led by Captain Daniel Morgan's company. Morgan's advance guard was followed by the companies of Captains John Lamb, Henry Dearborn, John Topham, and Thayer. Seven more companies formed the center and rear of the attack column. In the approach march, the column suffered some casualties from enemy fire. Since a snow storm was raging, the head of the column became disoriented and lost its direction before Thayer, who knew the way, led the soldiers on. Presently, they arrived before a barrier armed with two cannons which fired, causing further losses. As the guns were withdrawn to reload, Thayer and Morgan climbed through the gunports, followed by their men, and captured 60 of the defenders. Continuing up the street, the Americans surprised a group of Quebec militia and made them prisoners, making a total of 130. Since their own firearms were wet from the snow, the Americans appropriated the dry weapons of the Canadians. A second barrier farther along repelled all their attempts to seize it, partly because so many muskets misfired in the blizzard. After four hours of fighting, the Americans found themselves trapped and they surrendered when the British promised to grant them quarter.

Total American casualties in the disaster were 35 killed, 33 wounded, and 372 captured. Thayer's company suffered two killed, three wounded, and 25 captured. Of the latter group, seven men later agreed to enlist in the British army. For nine months he was held captive by the British. In September 1776 he was allowed to return to Providence on parole to await prisoner exchange. While he was still on parole in February 1777, the assembly promoted Thayer to the rank of major.

=== Fort Mifflin and other actions ===
After being exchanged on July 1, 1777, he served in Colonel Israel Angell's 2nd Rhode Island Regiment. An undated return of the regiment's 2nd Battalion under Thayer shows 141 soldiers present for duty. Of these, 33 hailed from Providence 31 from Newport, 15 from Smithfield, and the rest from smaller towns. At that time, the 2nd Regiment was brigaded with the 1st Rhode Island Regiment under the command of Brigadier General James Mitchell Varnum in Major General Israel Putnam's division on the Hudson River. Ordered to join the main army, the Rhode Island Brigade left Peekskill, New York, on September 29, 1777. The 1st Regiment under Colonel Christopher Greene reached Fort Mercer on October 11 and the 2nd Regiment a week later. Soon after, the 2nd Regiment was sent to defend Fort Mifflin on Mud Island in the Delaware River. When Fort Mercer was attacked by the Hessians on October 22, the 2nd Regiment was rowed across the river to help and participated in the Battle of Red Bank. During the battle, Thayer commanded a section of Fort Mercer's defenses. After the successful action, Greene sent him with a small party to bring in the wounded. While on this duty, two Hessian grenadiers pointed out to Thayer where their commander was lying wounded. He located the Colonel Carl von Donop and ordered six Americans to carry him into the fort. The Hessian officer later died of his wound.

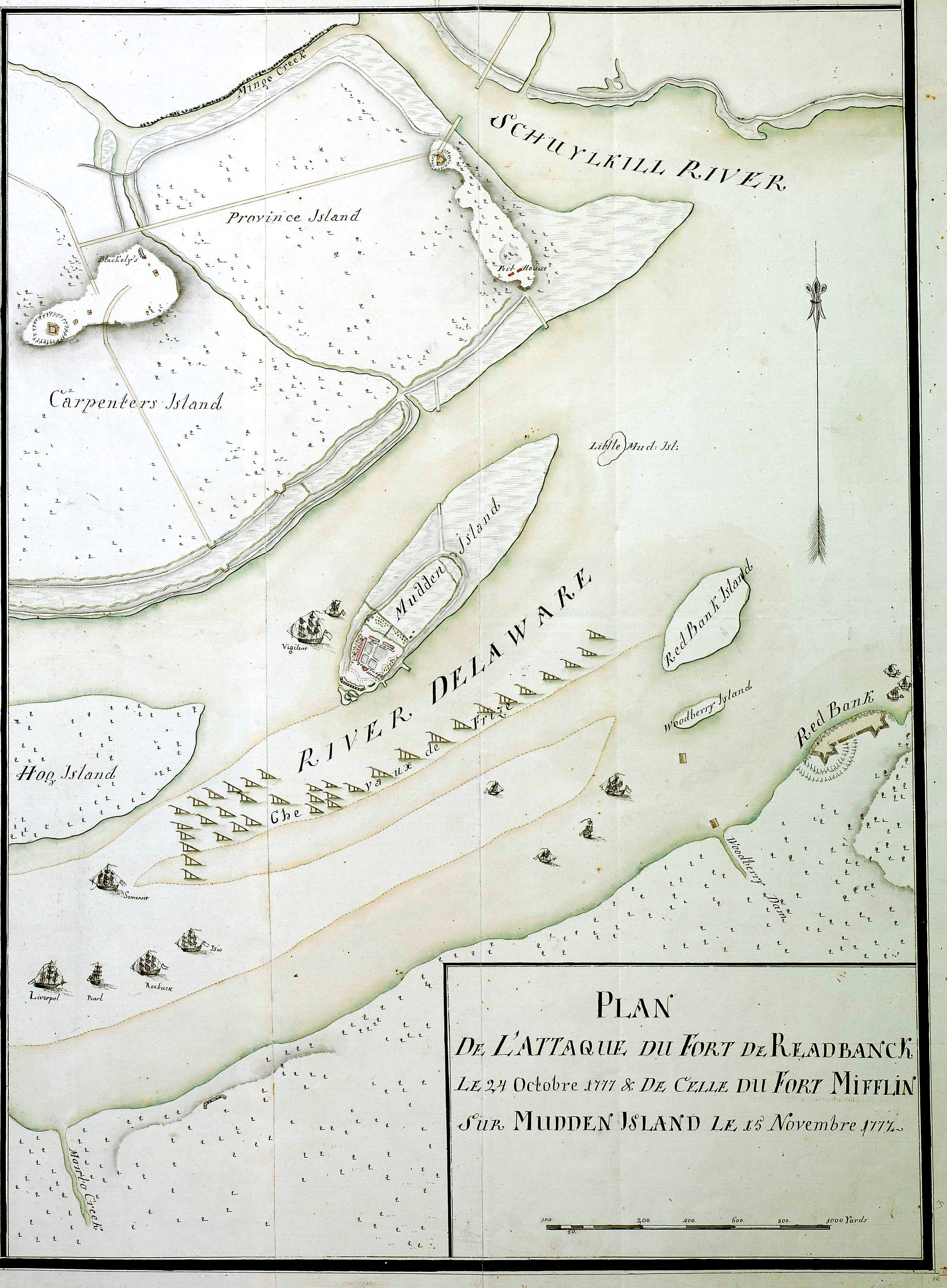
A Hessian map of Mud Island Fort

Thayer fought under the leadership of Lieutenant Colonel Samuel Smith during the latter part of the Siege of Fort Mifflin which lasted from September 26 to November 16, 1777. The defenders of the fort held out heroically against a bombardment by warships in the Delaware and by British batteries on the north bank. On October 23, the defenders scored a significant victory when HMS Augusta (64) and HMS Merlin (18) went aground near the fort. The stern of Augusta soon caught fire and the flames quickly spread. British accounts suggest the blaze was either set deliberately by the crew or caused accidentally by flaming wadding from her guns. The Americans claimed that hot shot from Fort Mifflin or fire ships set the third rate afire. The result is not in dispute. At mid-day, Augusta blew up in an enormous explosion that shattered windows in Philadelphia. The blast was heard 30 miles (48 km) away at Trappe, Pennsylvania. Sixty crew members including a lieutenant were killed as they struggled in the water to escape. After this disaster, the crew of Merlin set their ship on fire and rowed away. The smaller vessel later blew up as well.

On November 11, during an intense bombardment, Smith was badly bruised when a cannonball crashed into the barracks, struck him in the left hip, and showered him with bricks. Before being removed from the fort, Smith tried to get someone to volunteer to take command but no one stepped forward. Finally, Smith appointed Thayer to lead the defense, noting he was, "the bravest man he had ever known." Thayer accepted. He would command the fort from the 12th to the 15th. When he took charge, the situation was rapidly becoming critical. On November 15, the British managed to work Vigilant, an East Indiaman razeed into a 20-gun floating battery, into a position 200 paces from the fort. HMS Somerset (64), HMS Isis (50), HMS Roebuck (44), and HMS Pearl (32) blasted Mud Island from the river while numerous batteries flayed the fort from the land side. Thayer gamely directed his men to move a 32-pound cannon to the threatened area. The gun crew put 14 shots into Vigilant but soon had to abandon the piece as the position was deluged by fire. With the situation hopeless, Thayer ordered the fort to be evacuated that evening and the survivors were rowed across to Red Bank, New Jersey. There were about 300 survivors. Thayer stayed behind with about 40 men to burn down what remained of the barracks and left at midnight. On the morning of November 16, the British took possession of the wrecked fort.

On May 20, 1778, at the Battle of Barren Hill, Gilbert du Motier, marquis de La Fayette discovered that major British forces were converging on his detachment. La Fayette sent Thayer and 300 men to fight a delaying action while he slipped away across the Schuylkill River with the bulk of his force. Thayer held off the British advance guard and brought off his small command intact. At the Battle of Monmouth on June 28, 1778, Thayer fought with Colonel Joseph Cilley's detachment in Brigadier General Charles Scott's command. When the British counterattacked, Scott's men had to retreat across a swamp. During the withdrawal, a near-miss by a cannonball caused blood to flow from both eyes. With difficulty he remained in command during the day, but he had to leave the army the next day to recover. Thayer permanently lost vision in his right eye from the wound. After a five-week recovery at Morristown, New Jersey, he hastened to rejoin his regiment but missed the Battle of Rhode Island on August 29. During 1779 he served as an enlistment officer. Returning to his regiment in New Jersey, he led his troops at the Battle of Springfield on June 23, 1780. In this contest, he led the center of the regiment in the defense of the bridge and later covered the retreat. When the enemy force fell back, Brigadier General John Stark asked him to determine which way they were marching. Though he was frequently fired upon, Thayer followed alone on horseback and made reports.

== Retirement ==
On October 3, 1780, Congress voted to combine the two Rhode Island regiments, effective on January 1, 1781. On the latter date, Thayer retired from the Continental Army. He was an original member of the Rhode Island Society of the Cincinnati. For three years afterward he held the position of brigadier general of the Providence County brigade of the Rhode Island militia.

Of medium stature and agreeable nature, he was married three times. His first wife was Huldah Jackson (1738–1771), his second wife Mary Tourtelott (b. December 24, 1742), and his third wife was Huldah's sister (1763–1803), the former Mrs. Angell.

He had nine children, several of whom did not survive infancy. They were Nancy (1762–1783), William Tourtelott (b. 1767), Susan (d. 1768), Stephen Tourtelott (?–1769), Hannah Tourtelott (January–March 1769), Simeon (1770–1791), Polly (1772–1814), Richard Montgomery (b. 1775), and Henry (b. 1785).

He bought a house on Stamper's Hill in 1781 and opened the Montgomery Hotel in 1784. After operating the hotel for a few years, he sold it and bought a farm in Cumberland, Rhode Island.

Thayer died on October 14, 1800, after being thrown from his horse into a stream where he drowned. He was buried at the North Burial Ground in Providence, Rhode Island. His Journal of the Invasion of Canada in 1775 was edited by Edwin Martin Stone and published in 1867.

== See also ==
- 2nd Rhode Island Regiment
