= 2nd Rhode Island Regiment =

American Revolutionary War regiment

2nd Rhode Island Regiment 11th Continental Regiment
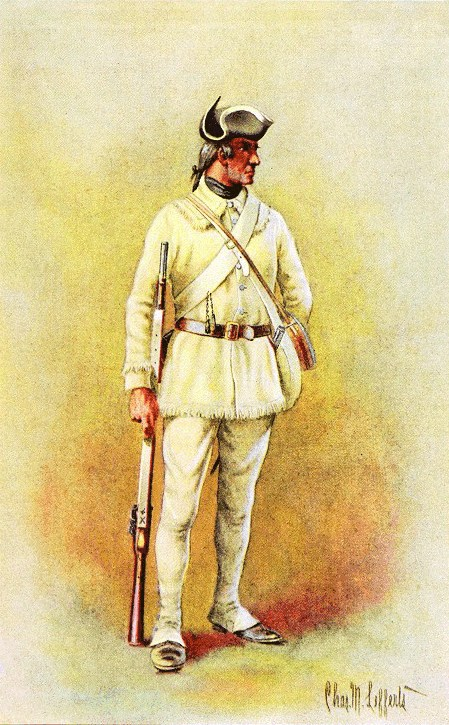
- 2nd Rhode Island Regiment of Infantry, 1779, Continental Line, Continental Army, by artist, Charles M. Lefferts
- Active: 1775–1781
- Country: United States of America
- Allegiance: Rhode Island
- Type: Infantry
- Part of: Rhode Island Line
- Nicknames: Hitchcock's Regiment (1775–1776); 11th Continental Regiment (1776–1781); Rhode Island Regiment (1781–1783)
- Engagements: American Revolutionary War: Siege of Boston; New York and New Jersey Campaign; Battle of the Assunpink Creek; Battle of Princeton; Battle of Red Bank; Siege of Fort Mifflin; Battle of Monmouth; Battle of Rhode Island; Battle of Springfield

Commanders
- Notable commanders: Colonel Daniel Hitchcock; Colonel Israel Angell

Insignia
- War Flag

The 2nd Rhode Island Regiment (also known as Hitchcock's Regiment and the 11th Continental Infantry) was authorized on 6 May 1775 under Colonel Daniel Hitchcock in the Rhode Island Army of Observation and was organized on 8 May 1775 as eight companies of volunteers from Providence County of the colony of Rhode Island. As part of a brigade organized under Nathanael Greene, the unit participated in the Siege of Boston during the remainder of 1775. Some elements accompanied Benedict Arnold's expedition to Quebec late in the year. The unit was renamed the 11th Continental Regiment on the first day of 1776.

In its new designation, the regiment fought in the New York and New Jersey campaign starting in August 1776. After retreating across New Jersey, the unit was renamed the 2nd Rhode Island Regiment and fought at Assunpink Creek and Princeton in early January. Hitchcock died soon after and the 2nd Regiment was ordered away to defend the Hudson River valley. In September 1777 the regiment, now under Colonel Israel Angell, was recalled to the main army for the Philadelphia Campaign. With the 1st Rhode Island Regiment, it won a victory at Red Bank in October 1777. Portions of the unit defended Fort Mifflin where the 2nd Regiment's Major Simeon Thayer assumed command of the fort near the end of the siege.

In 1778 the regiment fought at the battles of Monmouth and Rhode Island. In June of the following year it was in the thick of action at Springfield in New Jersey. On 1 January 1781, the regiment was consolidated with the 1st Regiment and the new unit was renamed the Rhode Island Regiment. For the unit's subsequent history, see the 1st Rhode Island Regiment.

== Regiment history ==
=== Hitchcock's Regiment (1775) ===
Shortly after the Battles of Lexington and Concord, the General Assembly of Rhode Island decided to raise a brigade of three regiments to join the Army of Observation during the Siege of Boston.

The three regiments were organized in May 1775. The regiment from Providence County was placed under the command of Colonel Daniel Hitchcock, for whom it was named as the Continental Army did not have numerical designations of units at that time. (The other two regiments were then known as Varnum's Regiment (raised in Kent and Kings Counties) and Church's Regiment (raised in Newport and Bristol Counties). Shortly after the regiments were organized, they marched north to Boston under the command of Brigadier General Nathanael Greene.

The Regiment would see action at Roxbury, Massachusetts during the Battle of Bunker Hill in June. The regiment was expanded to ten companies on 28 June 1775. It was adopted into the Continental Army when General George Washington arrived in Cambridge and took command on 3 July 1775. It was assigned to Greene's Brigade on 22 July 1775.

=== 11th Continental Infantry (1776) ===
The regiment was re-organized as the 11th Continental Infantry on 1 January 1776. Following the British evacuation of Boston in March, the regiment, along with the bulk of the Continental Army, was redeployed to defend New York City. The British landed in force on Long Island in September 1776 and defeated the inexperienced Continentals at the Battle of Long Island.

The last engagements of the 11th Continental Infantry were the Battles of Trenton and Princeton in early January 1777.

=== 2nd Rhode Island Regiment (1777–1781) ===
The regiment was re-organized as the 2nd Rhode Island Regiment after the death of Colonel Hitchcock on 13 January 1777. Colonel Israel Angell was placed in command of the regiment. In late 1777 it fought at the Battle of Red Bank and Major Simeon Thayer of the 2nd led the defenders during the latter part of the Siege of Fort Mifflin. The 2nd Rhode Island spent the winter of 1778 at Valley Forge.

In 1778 the 2nd Rhode Island Regiment distinguished itself at the Battles of Monmouth and the Rhode Island. From late 1778 to December 1780 the regiment was assigned to Starks's Brigade in the Main Army based in Morristown, New Jersey.

The regiment's last major engagement was the Battle of Springfield in June 1780, where the regiment lost six killed, 31 wounded and three missing out of a strength of 160. The regiment also fought in several other skirmishes and minor engagements before being consolidated with the 1st Rhode Island Regiment in 1781.

=== Consolidation (1781) ===
In February 1781, the 2nd Rhode Island Regiment was combined with the remnants of the 1st Rhode Island Regiment to form the Rhode Island Regiment (1781–1783). The Rhode Island Regiment fought at the Battle of Yorktown and served until British evacuated New York and was finally disbanded on 25 December 1783.

== Service record ==
Designation	Date	Brigade	Department
Hitchcock's Regiment	8 May 1775	none	none
Hitchcock's Regiment	22 July 1775	Greene's	Main Army
11th Continental Regiment	1 January 1776	Greene's	Main Army
11th Continental Regiment	12 August 1776	Nixon's	Main Army
11th Continental Regiment	22 December 1776	Hitchcock's	Main Army
2nd Rhode Island Regiment	1 January 1777	Hitchcock's	Main Army
2nd Rhode Island Regiment	13 January 1777	none	Main Army
2nd Rhode Island Regiment	12 March 1777	none	Highlands
2nd Rhode Island Regiment	10 July 1777	Rhode Island	Highlands
2nd Rhode Island Regiment	14 September 1777	Rhode Island	Main Army
2nd Rhode Island Regiment	19 July 1778	1st Massachusetts	Main Army
2nd Rhode Island Regiment	21 July 1778	Rhode Island	Eastern
2nd Rhode Island Regiment	17 November 1779	Stark's	Main Army
2nd Rhode Island Regiment	1 January 1781	Stark's	consolidated

== Significant campaigns and battles ==
- Siege of Boston (1775–1776)
- Battle of Long Island (1776)
- Battle of Trenton (1777)
- Battle of Princeton (1777)
- Morristown, New Jersey (1777)
- Battle of Red Bank (1777)
- Siege of Fort Mifflin (1777)
- Valley Forge (1777–1778)
- Battle of Monmouth (1778)
- Battle of Rhode Island (1778)
- Morristown, New Jersey (1779–1780)
- Battle of Springfield (1780)

== Senior Officers ==
=== Colonels ===
- Daniel Hitchcock; 3 May 1775 – 13 January 1777 (Died.)
- Israel Angell; 13 January 1777 – 31 December 1780 (Retired.)

=== Lieutenant Colonels ===
- Ezekiel Cornell; 3 May 1775 – 27 October 1776 (Discharged, promoted to brigadier general in the Rhode State Troops.)
- Israel Angell; 28 October 1776 – 13 January 1777 (Promoted.)
- Jeremiah Olney; 13 January 1777 – 31 December 1780 (Transferred to the Rhode Island Regiment.)

=== Majors ===
- Israel Angell; 3 May 1775 – 27 October 1776 (Promoted.)
- Christopher Smith; 28 October 1776 – 31 December 1776 (Discharged and served as major of Tallman's State Regiment from January to May 1777.)
- Simeon Thayer; 1 January 1777 – 31 December 1780 (Retired and promoted to brigadier general in the Rhode Island Militia.)

Note – The dates shown are the dates of rank. In many cases promotions were late and the date of rank was retroactively conferred.
