= 8th Connecticut Regiment =

- Active: 1775-1781
- Allegiance: Connecticut General Assembly, Continental Congress of the United States
- Type: Infantry
- Part of: Connecticut Line
- Engagements: American Revolutionary War: Siege of Boston (1775); Long Island (1776); Monmouth (1778)

Commanders
- Notable commanders: Jedediah Huntington

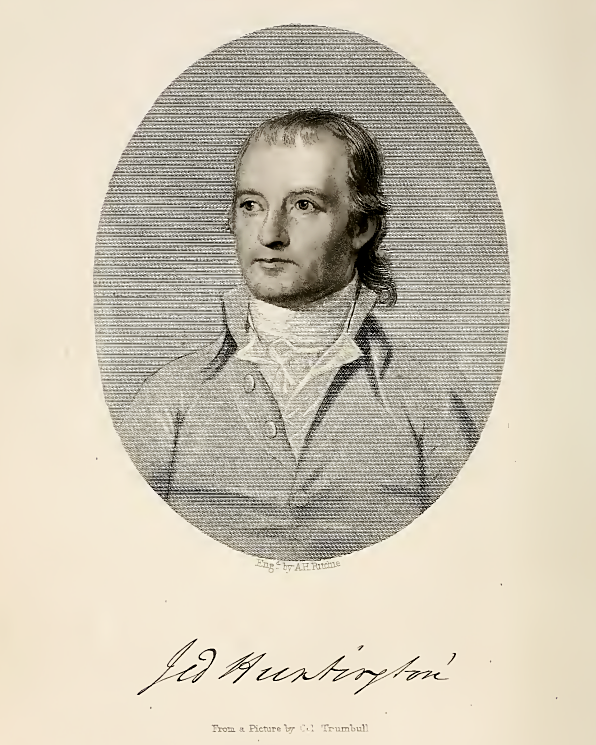
Jedediah Huntington

In October 1774, Jedediah Huntington of Norwich was made Colonel of the 20th Regiment of Connecticut Militia. When news of the Battles of Lexington and Concord arrived in Norwich on April 20, 1775 Colonel Huntington immediately got his men ready to march. On April 26 they arrived in Wrentham, Massachusetts, and a few days later they were in Roxbury and became part of the Siege of Boston. Because of a lack of overall command, as well as a lack of supplies, many of the militia units returned home.

In July 1775, the Connecticut Assembly ordered the creation of the 8th Connecticut Regiment and gave command to Colonel Huntington. The men were recruited mainly in New London, Hartford, and Windham counties and included much of Huntington's 20th regiment. The regiment was stationed on the Long Island Sound until September 14 when, on requisition from Washington, it was ordered to the Boston Camps and again took its post at Roxbury in Gen. Spencer's Brigade. The 8th remained active until expiration of the terms of service in December 1775.

As part of the January 1, 1776, organization of the Continental Army, Huntington's 8th Connecticut Regiment became the 17th Continental Regiment. Originally planned to have a strength of 728 officers and men, by the end of January the 17th only had about 400, as did most of the other regiments. On March 4, the 17th regiment was one of those ordered to take and hold Dorchester Heights, the action that ended the siege by forcing the British to evacuate Boston. The day following the end of the siege, Washington began moving the army to New York, and by April 22, Huntington and most of his unit were in position there.

Huntington's regiment began fortifying New York City in anticipation of a British attack and it was here they heard of the Declaration of Independence. The 17th had lost men during the Boston siege due to illness and desertion, which continued in New York. On about August 19, Colonel Huntington became seriously ill, possibly with malaria, and was unable to perform his duties, so his second in command Lt. Col. Joel Clark replaced him. On August 24, the regiment was ordered to the Brooklyn front. Because it was so understrength it was placed under the command of Gen. Parsons and combined with Col. Atlee's Pennsylvania regiment. When the Battle of Long Island was fought on the 27th, most of Huntington's regiment was surrounded and taken as prisoners, including Lt. Col. Clark, who died in captivity. The few men left of Huntington's regiment joined the main army under the command of Gen. Heath and evacuated with them as they fled New York. The 17th was never rebuilt and it ceased to exist when enlistments expired at the end of December, although many of the men continued to serve.

On Jan 1, 1777 the new 8th Regiment, "Connecticut Line" was formed for the new "Continental Line," and it was placed under the command of Colonel John Chandler, and saw action in the Battle of Germantown, the Siege of Fort Mifflin, and the Battle of Monmouth. The regiment was merged into the 1st Connecticut Regiment on January 1, 1781, at West Point, New York and disbanded on November 15, 1783.

== Notable members ==
Joseph Plumb Martin served in this regiment from 1777 until he was assigned to the Light Infantry in 1778, and then the Corps of Sappers and Miners in 1780. He published his memoirs about his experiences in 1830.

Samuel Mattocks commanded a company in the 8th Connecticut with the rank of Captain. After resigning his commission he moved to Tinmouth, Vermont. Mattocks was Vermont State Treasurer during Vermont's early years, and the father of Governor John Mattocks.

Captain Oliver Spicer served in command of Company A, 8th Regiment of foot. He served in the command of Colonel Smith and Colonel Gallup's Service.
