= Israel Angell =

Continental Army officer

- Born: August 24, 1740; Providence, Rhode Island
- Died: May 4, 1832 (aged 91)
- Military career
- Allegiance: United States
- Branch: Continental Army
- Rank: Colonel
- Commands: 2nd Rhode Island Regiment
- Conflicts: American Revolutionary War: Siege of Boston; Battle of Brandywine; Battle of Red Bank; Battle of Monmouth; Battle of Rhode Island; Battle of Springfield

Israel Angell (August 24, 1740 - May 4, 1832) was a Continental Army officer of the American Revolutionary War.

== Early life and education ==
He was born to Oliver and Naomi (Smith) Angell in Providence, Rhode Island. He was a descendant of one of the original settlers in Rhode Island. He had a good education and developed an early interest in scientific matters. He married three times and had seventeen children.

== Revolutionary War service ==
Angell served nearly throughout the entire war in Rhode Island and was successively promoted.

He was appointed a major of Colonel Daniel Hitchcock's Regiment at the outbreak of the American Revolution. He served with the regiment in the Siege of Boston. When the Continental Army was reorganized on January 1, 1776, Hitchcock's Regiment was re-designated as the 11th Continental Infantry. Late in 1776, Hitchcock was appointed as a brigade commander and Angell assumed command of the regiment. The regiment was re-designated as the 2nd Rhode Island Regiment on January 1, 1777, and Angell was promoted to lieutenant colonel of the regiment. A few days later, he was promoted to colonel in command of the regiment following the death of Colonel Hitchcock on January 13, 1777.

Angell served at Valley Forge in the Winter of 1777 to 1778, and in the following battles:

- Siege of Boston (1775)
- Battle of Brandywine (1777)
- Battle of Red Bank (1777)
- Battle of Monmouth (1778)
- Battle of Rhode Island (1778)
- Battle of Springfield (1780)

He was particularly distinguished in the Battle of Springfield, where he withheld a key bridge from British troop advances. He received recognition correspondence for this act of heroism from George Washington and Nathanael Greene. He also served at various places in Rhode Island and New Jersey and along highlands of the Hudson River, most notably at Peekskill and West Point. He retired from the army on January 1, 1781, after the two Rhode Island regiments were consolidated into a single regiment known as the Rhode Island Regiment.

== Later life ==
He settled in Johnston, Rhode Island as farmer and cooper. He later lived in Smithfield, Rhode Island.

== Personal life ==
He married Martha Angell. His 2nd marriage was to Susanne Wright. His 3rd marriage was to Sarah Wood. Angell had 17 children.

== Death and legacy ==
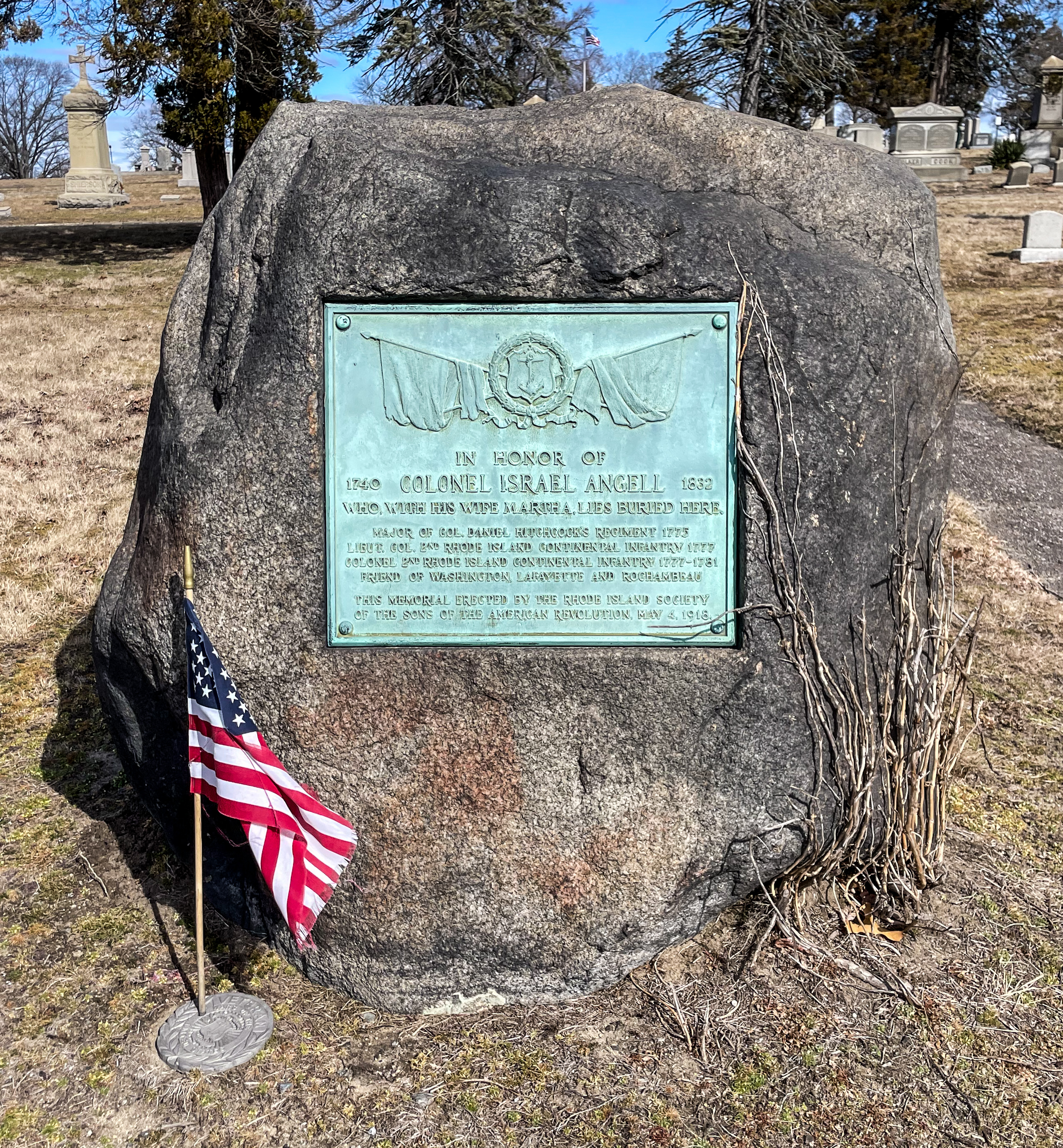
Angell's grave at North Burial Ground

Colonel Angell died on May 14, 1832, at the age of 91. He was originally buried in Johnston, Rhode Island. In 1918 his remains were moved to the North Burial Ground in Providence, Rhode Island and a large plaque was placed there in his honor by the Rhode Island Society of the Sons of the American Revolution. He is the highest ranking Rhode Island officer who served in the Continental Army who is buried in Rhode Island.
