= Battle of Springfield =

1780 battle of the American Revolutionary War

Coordinates: 40.7101°N 74.3069°W

- Part of the American Revolutionary War
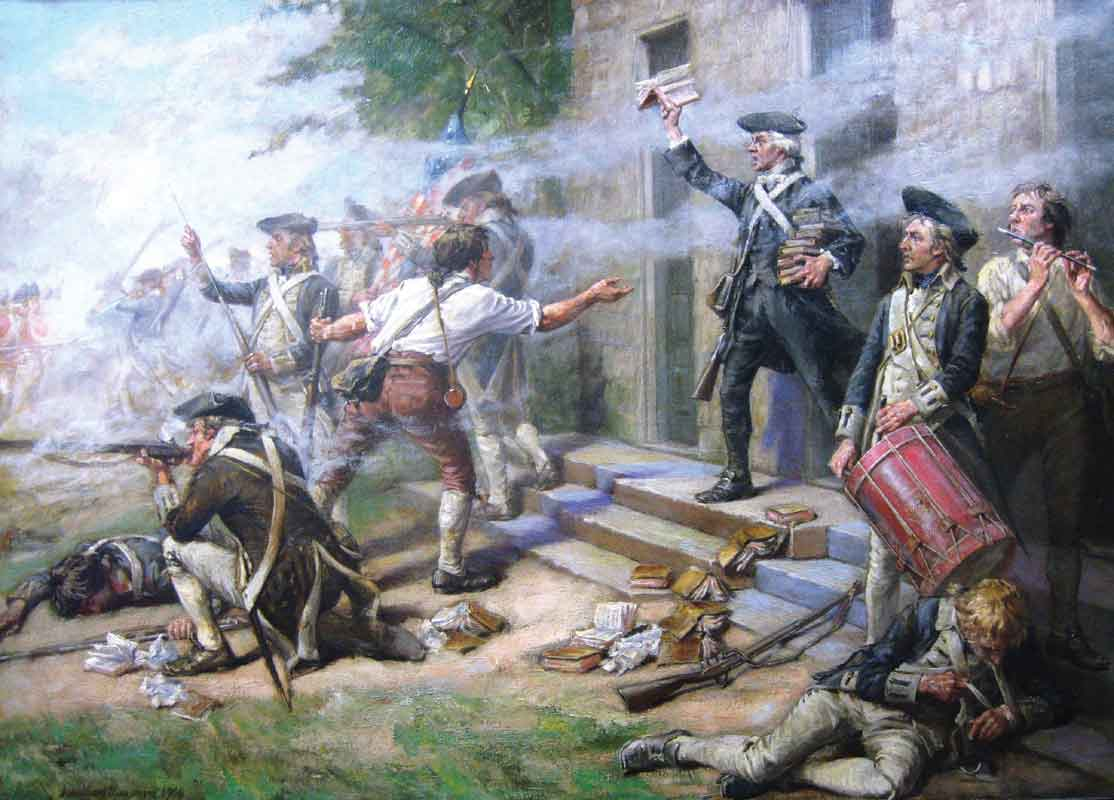
- "Give 'em Watts, boys!" - Presbyterian Reverend James Caldwell giving Continentals Isaac Watts' hymn books for wadding
Date	June 23, 1780
Location	Springfield Township, Essex County (present day Union County), New Jersey
Result	American victory

Belligerents
United States	(Kingdom of Great Britain) Great Britain; Hesse-Kassel

Commanders and leaders
(United States) Nathanael Greene	(Hesse) Wilhelm von Knyphausen

Strength
1,500, reinforced by undetermined number of militia	6,000

Casualties and losses
Continentals; 13 killed; 49 wounded; 9 missing Militia: Including June 7; 10 killed; 40 wounded; 10 captured	Including June 7; 25 killed 234 wounded 48 missing

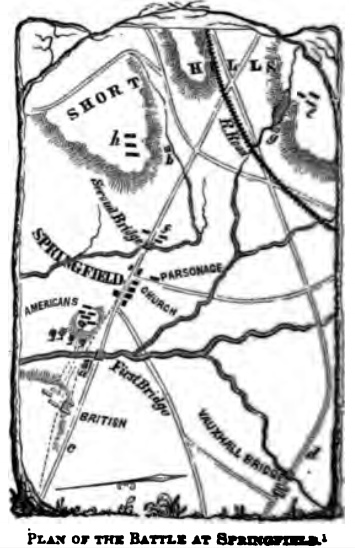
Battle of Springfield

The Battle of Springfield was fought during the American Revolutionary War on June 23, 1780, in Union County, New Jersey. After the Battle of Connecticut Farms, on June 7, 1780, had foiled Lieutenant General Wilhelm, Baron von Knyphausen's expedition to attack General George Washington's army at Morristown, New Jersey, Knyphausen and Lieutenant General Sir Henry Clinton, British commander-in-chief in North America, decided upon a second attempt. Although the British were initially able to advance, they were ultimately forced to withdraw in the face of newly arriving rebel forces, resulting in a Continental victory. The battle effectively ended British ambitions in New Jersey.

== Battle ==
=== British plan ===
A two-pronged assault was planned. Starting from Elizabethtown Point, one column would advance along the Galloping Hill Road, straight through Connecticut Farms and Springfield, while another column would take the Vauxhall Road north of Springfield along the southern edge of Short Hills. Both were heading for the same objective as on June 7: Hobart Gap, the path through the Watchung Mountains that would allow an advance across eleven miles of flat ground to Washington's main encampment at Morristown.

Clinton hoped that Washington would respond to Knyphausen's attack by bringing his main army round the northern tip of the Watchung Mountains west of Newark to hit Knyphausen's right flank. In anticipation of this response, Major General Alexander Leslie was dispatched up the Hudson with 6,000 men in order to prevent Washington from retiring behind the Watchung Mountains. Meanwhile, Major General James Robertson was to remain in reserve in Elizabethtown with five regiments (1,865 men) to protect Knyphausen's rear against attack from militia and to reinforce Leslie if necessary.

=== Opposing forces ===
Knyphausen's corps comprised some 6,000 men, comprising the 17th Regiment of Light Dragoons; a detachment of the Royal Regiment of Artillery; the British Guards Battalion (a composite unit comprising detachments from the 1st Guards, Coldstream Guards and Scots Guards); the British 22nd, 37th, 38th, 42nd (Royal Highland), 43rd and 57th Regiments of Foot; the Hessian Prince's own Leib-Regiment; the Hessian Regiment von Donop; the Hessian Corps of Jägers and three Loyalist regiments: the Queen's Rangers and the 1st and 4th New Jersey Volunteers.

At Springfield and Elizabethtown, barring Knyphausen's path to Hobart Gap, Major General Nathanael Greene had 1,500 Continental troops and 500 New Jersey Militia. Greene's Continentals comprised Brigadier General William Maxwell's New Jersey Brigade; Brigadier General John Stark's under-strength brigade (comprising the 2nd Rhode Island Regiment and a regiment each from Massachusetts and Connecticut) and the 2nd Partisan Corps, commanded by Major Henry Lee and numbering 400.

=== British advance ===
At 5 a.m. on June 23, Knyphausen's force advanced for Elizabethtown Point, with the Queen's Rangers and the New Jersey Volunteers in the vanguard. They overwhelmed the American outposts at Elizabethtown, capturing several men and three small cannons. Warned by retreating men, General Maxwell sent Colonel Elias Dayton's 3rd New Jersey Regiment to guard the Galloping Hill Road and Henry Lee's 2nd Partisan Corps to the Vauxhall Road. Soon afterwards, the advancing Loyalist troops engaged Maxwell, who fell back toward Connecticut Farms with the rest of his brigade. Meanwhile, General Greene ordered the planking to be destroyed on the Vauxhall and Galloping Hill bridges over the Rahway River.

=== Greene's dispositions ===
Greene organized his left wing, at the Galloping Hill Road, into four successive lines of defense. Connecticut Farms was to be held by Colonel Dayton's 3rd New Jersey and some militia under Brigadier General Nathaniel Heard. Behind Dayton, Colonel Israel Angell with his 2nd Rhode Island Regiment, reduced by illness and expiring enlistments to only 160 men, was to defend the Galloping Hill Bridge. Behind Angell, at a bridge over the west branch of the Rahway, Greene positioned Colonel Israel Shreve and his 2nd New Jersey Regiment and, behind Shreve, Brigadier General Philemon Dickinson commanded a detachment of New Jersey Militia.

On the American right wing, Greene reinforced Major Lee and his 2nd Partisan Corps at the Vauxhall Bridge with Colonel Matthias Ogden and his 1st New Jersey Regiment.

In reserve, at Bryan's Tavern up on the high ground of the Short Hills, Greene retained the rest of Maxwell's and Stark's brigades.

=== The Galloping Hill Road (now known as Morris Avenue) ===
The New Jersey Volunteers under Lieutenant Colonel Joseph Barton, now approached Connecticut Farms and engaged Dayton's force, who were well positioned in an orchard and behind a thicket. Outnumbered more than two-to-one by the defenders, Barton's men made little progress. However, Lieutenant Colonel John Graves Simcoe with his Queen's Rangers outflanked the Americans on the left and attacked them from the rear. Dayton and Heard's men were quickly swept away and Connecticut Farms was in British hands. Heard and some of his militiamen retired northward and reinforced the defenders of the Vauxhall Bridge.

Knyphausen now diverted the Queen's Rangers, the New Jersey Volunteers, the Guards Battalion and most of his other British troops from the Galloping Hill Road northward to the Vauxhall Road, in the hope of outflanking the defenders of the Galloping Hill Bridge. Meanwhile, Knyphausen himself advanced on the bridge with 3,000 men, comprising the British 37th and 38th regiments and most of the German troops.

At the Galloping Hill Bridge, Knyphausen bombarded Colonel Angell's defenders with six cannons, which the Americans answered with their only available gun. As the American artillery ran low on wadding, James Caldwell, the Continental Army chaplain, who had lost his wife during the Battle of Connecticut Farms, brought up a load of hymn books published by English clergyman Isaac Watts to use instead. "Give 'em Watts, boys!", he advised. After heavy exchanges of fire and two unsuccessful attempts to charge the bridge, the British 37th and 38th regiments and the Hessian Jägers forded the Rahway and, in twenty-five minutes of tree-to-tree fighting in the woods, drove the Rhode Islanders back to the bridge over the west branch of the Rahway defended by Shreve and his 2nd New Jersey Regiment. The British quickly followed up the retreat, driving back Shreve and Angell, who only narrowly foiled an attempt to outflank them by the British 38th Regiment and the Jägers. Recognizing the danger of Shreve and Angell being encircled, Greene recalled them to Bryant's Tavern, abandoning Springfield to the enemy.

=== Vauxhall Road ===
As directed by Knyphausen, Major General Edward Mathew had left the Galloping Hill Road and crossed northward to the Vauxhall Road. Halting on a height above the Vauxhall Bridge, he bombarded its defenders with his artillery until 11 a.m., when he attacked, with the Queen's Rangers and New Jersey Volunteers fording the Rahway on either side of the bridge. Major Lee and his detachment made a fighting retreat of almost two miles to the upper west branch of the Rahway and positioned his men in echelons, so that they could fire out of the woods onto the road. They were soon joined by the advancing Loyalist troops, who assailed them from front and flank, driving them back again; this time all the way to the slopes of the Short Hills. Here, they were reinforced by the 400 men of General Stark's two Continental regiments and a cannon. This, and the presence of an increasing number of militia gathering on the slopes of Newark Mountain, persuaded General Mathew to halt his advance. As the militiamen began to engage Colonel Barton's New Jersey Volunteers, Mathew became concerned about the possibility of a counter-attack on his flank by Washington's main army, and he turned his column back southward to the Galloping Hill Road to rejoin Knyphausen.

=== British withdrawal ===
When Mathew's column reached the Galloping Hill Road, they joined Knyphausen in Springfield. Knyphausen ordered Mathew to capture the Heights of Springfield to the northwest of the town. Mathew sent forward Lieutenant Colonel Edward Thomas with the Guards Battalion, who stormed the heights, routing the militia defenders. This was as far as the British advance was ever to get. Having failed to clear his path to Hobart Gap, Knyphausen was disheartened by the numbers of New Jersey Militia who were gathering on the Short Hills and he decided to call off the attack and return to Elizabethtown Point. Knyphausen ordered the New Jersey Volunteers to burn down Springfield. Only four houses were spared; every other building was burned to the ground. It has been claimed the four buildings spared were Loyalist houses but this is disputed by local historians.

The British withdrew in two columns, one taking the Galloping Hill Road, the other the Vauxhall Road. The column that took the Galloping Hill Road came under constant sniping fire from New Jersey militiamen in the woods and incurred substantial casualties. The Hessian Jägers were detailed for the rear guard but found themselves low on ammunition. They suffered five men killed and another five captured during the withdrawal. They were relieved as rearguard by the 37th Regiment, who had more success in fending off the militia. The column on the Vauxhall Road had their flanks and rear guarded by the Queen's Rangers, who foiled most of the militia's attempts at ambush.

At midnight on June 23, Knyphausen led his division back over a bridge of boats from Elizabethtown Point to Staten Island.

== Casualties ==
The British loss for the expedition that included the Battle of Connecticut Farms on June 7 as well as the engagement of June 23 was 25 killed, 234 wounded and 48 missing. 85 of these casualties were Hessian Jaegers.

The Continental troops lost thirteen killed, 49 wounded and nine missing on June 23; of whom six killed, 31 wounded and three missing were from Angell's Rhode Island Regiment. Thomas Fleming says that the Pennsylvania Packet of July 8, 1780 reported that the militia casualties for the whole period of June 7–23 were ten killed, forty wounded and ten prisoners. Including the Continental Army losses on June 7, which were twelve killed, fifty wounded and thirteen missing, the combined American casualties for June 7 and June 23 were 35 killed, 139 wounded, ten prisoners and 22 missing.

== Aftermath ==
This was one of the last major engagements of the Revolutionary War in the north and effectively put an end to British ambitions in New Jersey. Because the decisive battles of the war moved farther south, Springfield became known as the "forgotten victory." Washington praised the role of the New Jersey Militia in the battle, writing, "They flew to arms universally and acted with a spirit equal to anything I have seen in the course of the war". A little less than a month later, the minor Battle of Bull's Ferry was fought.

The river crossings where American forces put up their defense were near today's intersection between Vauxhall Road and Millburn Avenue; and Morris Avenue near Washington Avenue.

== See also ==
- American Revolutionary War § Stalemate in the North. Places the Battle of Springfield in overall sequence and strategic context.
