= Daniel Hitchcock =

Continental Army officer (1739–1777)

- Born: February 15, 1739; Springfield, Massachusetts
- Died: January 13, 1777 (aged 37) Morristown, New Jersey
- Allegiance: United States
- Branch: Continental Army
- Service years: (United States) 1775–1777
- Rank: Colonel
- Conflicts: American Revolutionary War; Siege of Boston; Battle of Long Island; Battle of Harlem Heights; Battle of White Plains; Battle of the Assunpink Creek; Battle of Trenton; Battle of Princeton
- Other work: Attorney

Daniel Hitchcock (February 15, 1739 – January 13, 1777) was born in Massachusetts and graduated from Yale University. He moved to Providence, Rhode Island, where he became an attorney and was suspected by the authorities of involvement in the Gaspee Affair. At the start of the American Revolutionary War he formed Hitchcock's Regiment of infantry in the Rhode Island Army of Observation. He was first appointed lieutenant colonel in command of the regiment when it marched to serve in the Siege of Boston in 1775. His regiment was renamed the 11th Continental Regiment during 1776. That year, he led his troops at Long Island, Harlem Heights, and White Plains.

He was promoted to colonel in November 1776. His regiment was renamed the 2nd Rhode Island Regiment at the start of 1777. He led a small brigade of Rhode Island troops at Assunpink Creek and Princeton. At the latter action on 3 January 1777, George Washington publicly thanked him for his efforts. He died ten days later of tuberculosis at Morristown, New Jersey.

== Early life ==
Not much is known of Daniel Hitchcock's early life. He was born on February 15, 1739, in Springfield, Massachusetts. He was the youngest of 14 children from Lieutenant Ebenezer and Mary Hitchcock. In 1761, Hitchcock graduated from Yale University, and he went on to practice law in Northampton, Massachusetts. Hitchcock moved to Providence, Rhode Island, in 1771. Hitchcock was thought by authorities to be affiliated with the Gaspée Affair, a sinking of a British ship and a lead up to the American Revolutionary War. Hitchcock, along with other lawyers, were forced to testify in front of the Rhode Island Court. Hitchcock, however, denied any involvement in the Affair.

== American Revolution ==
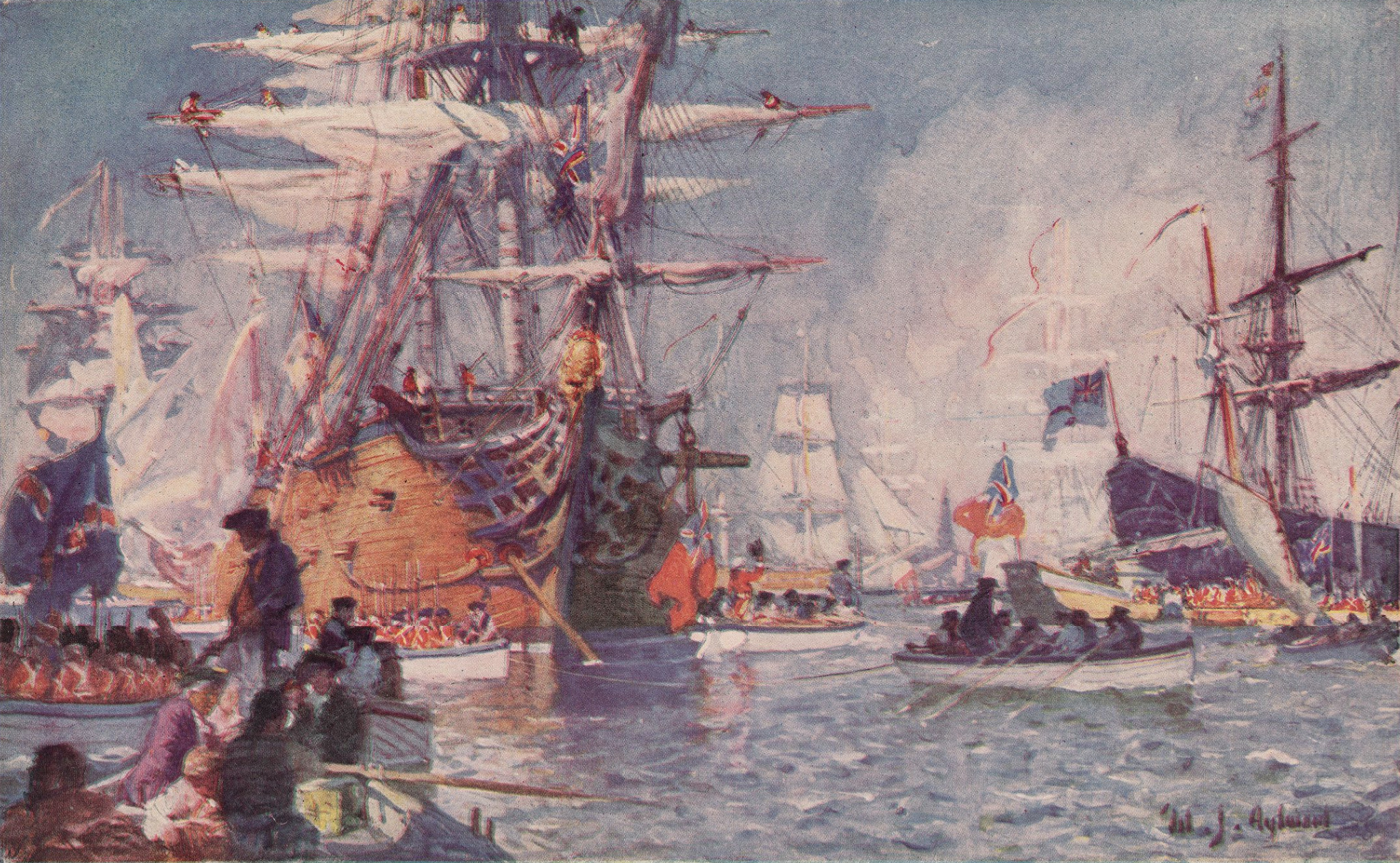
The British evacuation of Boston which ended the siege of Boston

In June 1775, Hitchcock authorized the Providence County Regiment, which was organized as eight companies of volunteers from Providence County of the colony of Rhode Island. The Regiment's first battle was the Siege of Boston, the opening battle of the American Revolutionary War. At the start of 1776, the Regiment was renamed to the 11th Continental Regiment. The colonists were victorious on May 17, 1776, and the British were removed from the town of Boston, Massachusetts.

Hitchcock's next battle was the Battle of Long Island. The British landed in Long Island on August 22 ready to attack American troops. Hitchcock's Regiment had 368 men. He and six other Regiments were sent to Long Island on August 25, when it was clear that was the British target. The battle took place two days later, and the British won in a decisive victory. This battle was the first major battle in the American Revolutionary War following the United States Declaration of Independence, the largest battle of the entire conflict, and the first battle in which an army of the United States engaged, having declared itself a nation only the month before.

On September 15, 1776, the British moved part of their troops to Kip's Bay, Manhattan. The following day, the Battle of Harlem Heights happened. The British were losing, and started to retreat. George Washington sent various troops, including Hitchcock's Regiment, to pursue them. By the time the units got there, the British brought in more reinforcements. The British troops ran out of ammunition and were forced to retreat a second time. The Americans kept up a close pursuit until it was heard that British reserves were coming, and Washington, fearing a British trap, ordered a withdrawal, and the Americans won the battle.

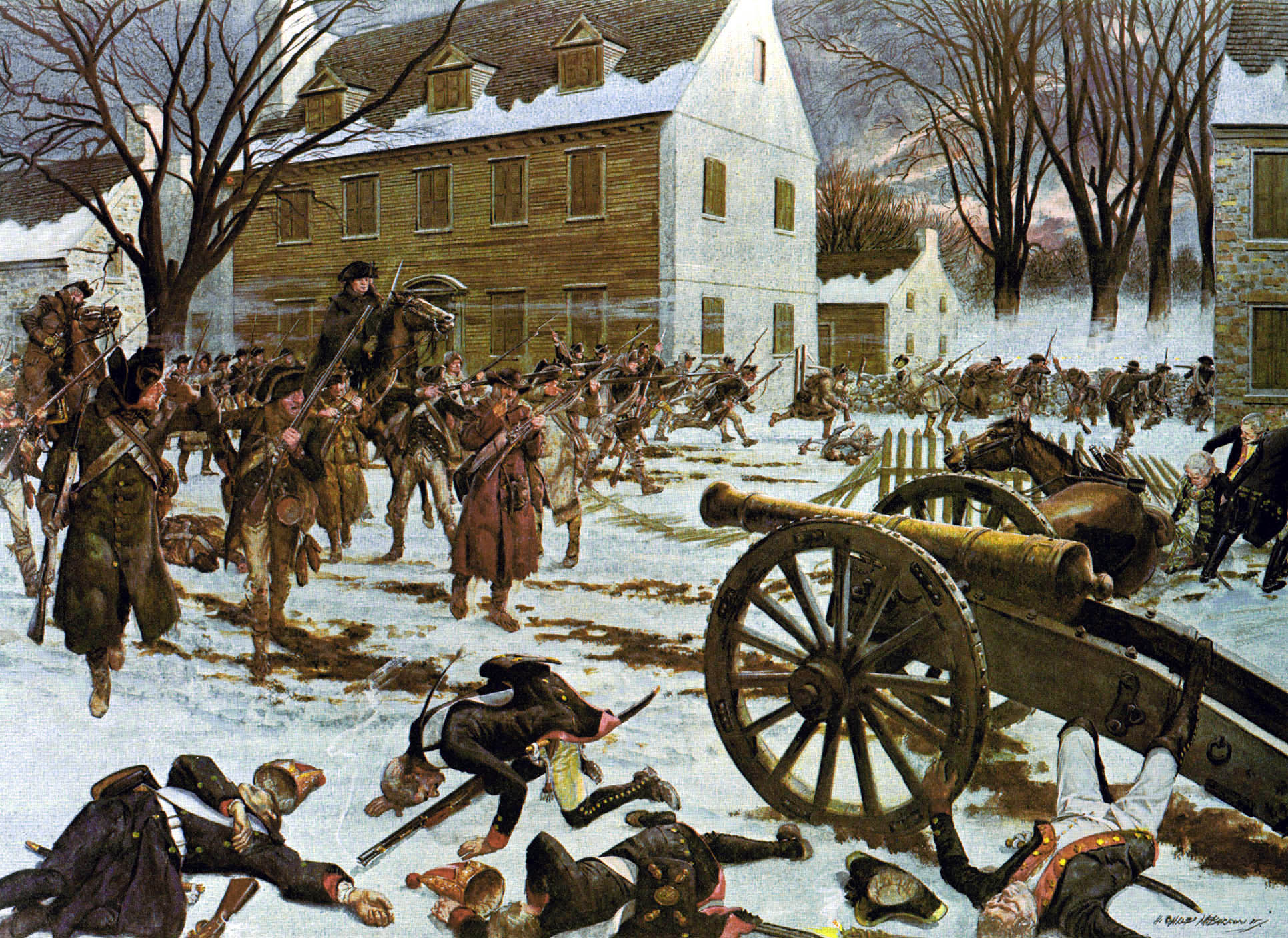
Battle of Trenton, by H. Charles McBarron, Jr., 1975

Hitchcock's next battle was the Battle of White Plains. Following the retreat of George Washington's Continental Army northward from New York City, British General William Howe landed troops in Westchester County, intending to cut off Washington's escape route. Alerted to this move, Washington retreated farther, establishing a position in the village of White Plains but failed to establish firm control over local high ground. Howe's troops drove Washington's troops from a hill near the village; following this loss, Washington ordered the Americans to retreat farther north.

Later British movements chased Washington across New Jersey and into Pennsylvania. Washington then crossed the Delaware and surprised a brigade of Hessian troops in the December 26 Battle of Trenton. Hitchcock led a Brigade of an estimated 822 men. He, along with several other units, stayed away from the Battle and were used at backups in case Washington needed them. The Americans won in a decisive victory, which proved to be great for American moral throughout the colonies.

The American troops were expecting a counter-attack from the British, so the Army established a defensive position south of the Assunpink Creek. On December 31, Washington learned that an army of 8,000 men under the command of General Charles Cornwallis was moving to attack him at Trenton. The Battle of the Assunpink Creek, which Hitchcock's Regiment fought in, took place on January 2, 1777. Cornwallis' advance was significantly slowed due to defensive skirmishing by American riflemen under the command of Edward Hand, and the advance guard did not reach Trenton until twilight. After assaulting the American positions three times, and being repulsed each time, Cornwallis decided to wait and finish the battle the next day.

Washington, attacked during the night, and the Battle of Princeton happened on January 3, 1777. Brigadier General Hugh Mercer of the Continental Army clashed with two regiments under the command of Lieutenant Colonel Charles Mawhood of the British Army. Mercer and his troops were overrun and Washington sent some militia under Brigadier General John Cadwalader to help him. The militia, on seeing the flight of Mercer's men, also began to flee. Washington rode up with reinforcements and rallied the fleeing militia. He then led the attack on Mawhood's troops, driving them back. Mawhood gave the order to retreat and most of the troops tried to flee to Cornwallis in Trenton. Hitchcock was infected with dysentery during the battle; however, he commanded the "New England Brigade", which helped the Americans win the battle. Washington personally thanked Hitchcock for his efforts during the War in front of the entire Continental Army. Hitchcock died on January 13, 1777, at a camp in Morristown, and he was buried January 14.
