= Battle of Red Bank =

Battle fought during the American Revolutionary war

Coordinates: 39.871371°N 75.18941°W

- Part of the Philadelphia campaign of the American Revolutionary War
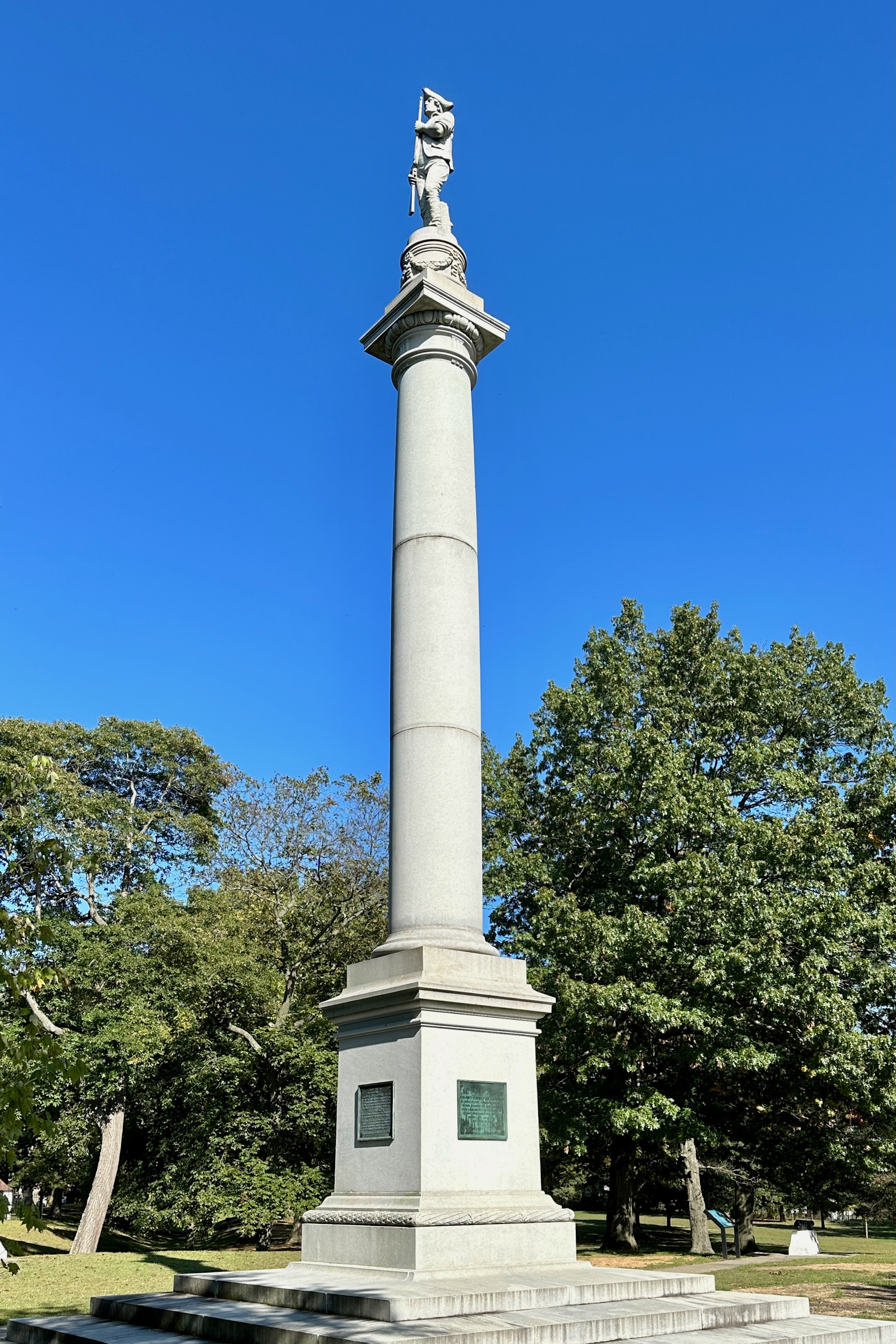
- Monument at Fort Mercer commemorating the battle
Date	October 22, 1777; 249 years ago
Location	Fort Mercer, National Park, New Jersey
Result	American victory

Belligerents
United States	Hesse-Kassel

Commanders and leaders
Christopher Greene; John Hazelwood	Carl von Donop †

Strength
~600 American troops	~2,300 Hessian troops

Casualties and losses
14 killed 23 wounded	82 killed 228 wounded 60 captured

The Battle of Red Bank, also known as the Battle of Fort Mercer, was fought on October 22, 1777, during the American Revolutionary War. A force of 1,200 Hessian troops was sent to take Fort Mercer on the New Jersey side of the Delaware River just south of Philadelphia, but was defeated by a smaller force of Continental Army troops.

Although Fort Mercer ultimately fell to the British a month later, the victory at the Battle of Red Bank served as a much-needed morale boost to the Patriot cause, delaying British plans to consolidate gains in Philadelphia, and relieving pressure on Washington's Continental Army, which was embedded north of Philadelphia.

== Prelude to battle ==
The Fort Mercer flag flown by Christopher Greene during the Battle of Red Bank

After the British capture of Philadelphia on September 26, 1777, and the failure of the American surprise attack against the British camp at the Battle of Germantown on October 4, the Americans tried to deny the British use of the city by blockading the Delaware River.

Two forts were constructed to command the Delaware River: Fort Mercer on the New Jersey side at Red Bank in what was then part of Deptford Township and is now the borough of National Park. The second was Fort Mifflin on Mud Island, in the Delaware River just south of the Delaware River's confluence with the Schuylkill River, on the Pennsylvania side opposite Fort Mercer. As long as the Continental Army held both forts, British navy ships could not reach Philadelphia to resupply their army.

In addition to the forts, the Americans possessed a small flotilla of Continental Navy ships on the Delaware River supplemented by the Pennsylvania State Navy. The flotilla consisted of sloops, schooners, galleys, an assortment of floating batteries and fourteen old vessels laden with barrels of tar to be used as a means of defending the river. The fleet was armed with about one hundred cannon total, under the overall command of Commodore John Hazelwood. The fleet of Admiral Howe's consisted of eight or nine war vessels and several transports. His vessels were fully manned, with 285 guns on the war vessels alone. On just two of the vessels stranded in the river, Howe commanded more officers and men than Commodore Hazelwood had in his entire fleet.

On October 18, General Sir William Howe, the commander of the British Army, evacuated his camp at Germantown, and pulled his forces inside the city of Philadelphia. He sent a part of his force to capture the two American forts denying him use of the Delaware River. Earlier, Howe had sent a group of men via Webb's Ferry, at the mouth of the Schuylkill River, to marshy Providence Island (actually on the Pennsylvania mainland by Mud Island) to construct artillery batteries to bombard Fort Mifflin.

The first bombardment of Fort Mifflin came on October 11. This was merely a desultory attack which convinced the British to expand and improve their batteries. At Cooper's Ferry in Camden, New Jersey, 2,000 Hessian auxiliary troops under the command of Colonel Carl von Donop landed about four miles (6.4 km) from Fort Mercer, and made preparations to attack the fort, located on the high ground at Red Bank.

The fort was garrisoned with four hundred men with fourteen pieces of cannon, and were reported to have not been intimidated. At 4 p.m. Donop sent an officer and a drummer with a flag and summons to surrender with the ultimatum, "The King of England orders his rebellious subjects to lay down their arms", and warned that, if they stand the battle, no quarter whatever would be given, to which Colonel Greene promptly replied, "We ask no quarter, nor will we give any". (Note: No quarter means that the option to surrender would no longer be an option) The garrison at the fort replied that they would defend the fort to the last man. Since it was ascertained that the fort was lightly garrisoned, Donop decided to attack directly, and declared "We'll change the name from Fort Red Bank to Fort Donop."

== Battle ==
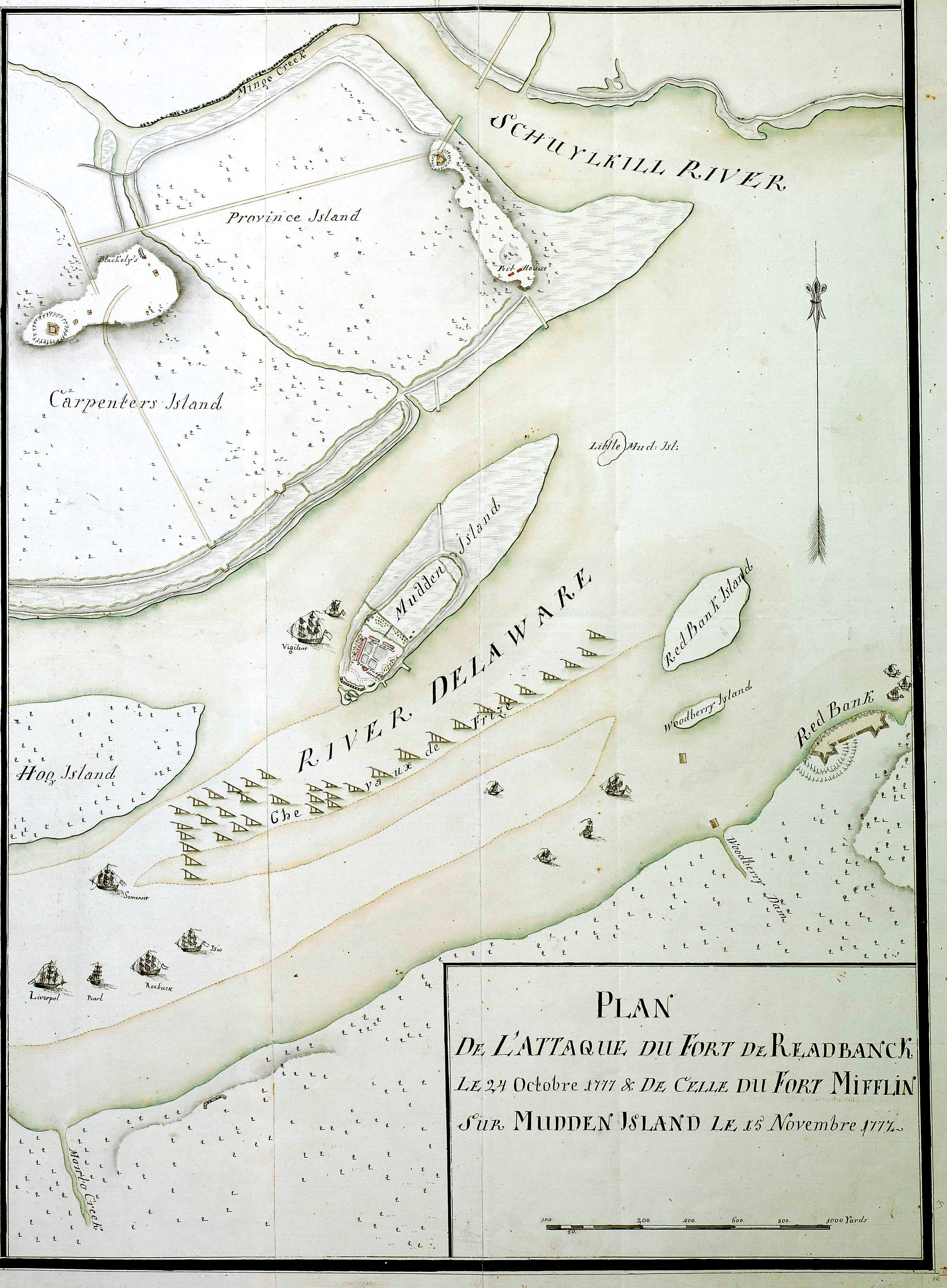
A 1777 Hessian map showing the military campaign against Fort Mifflin and Fort Mercer (Redbank)

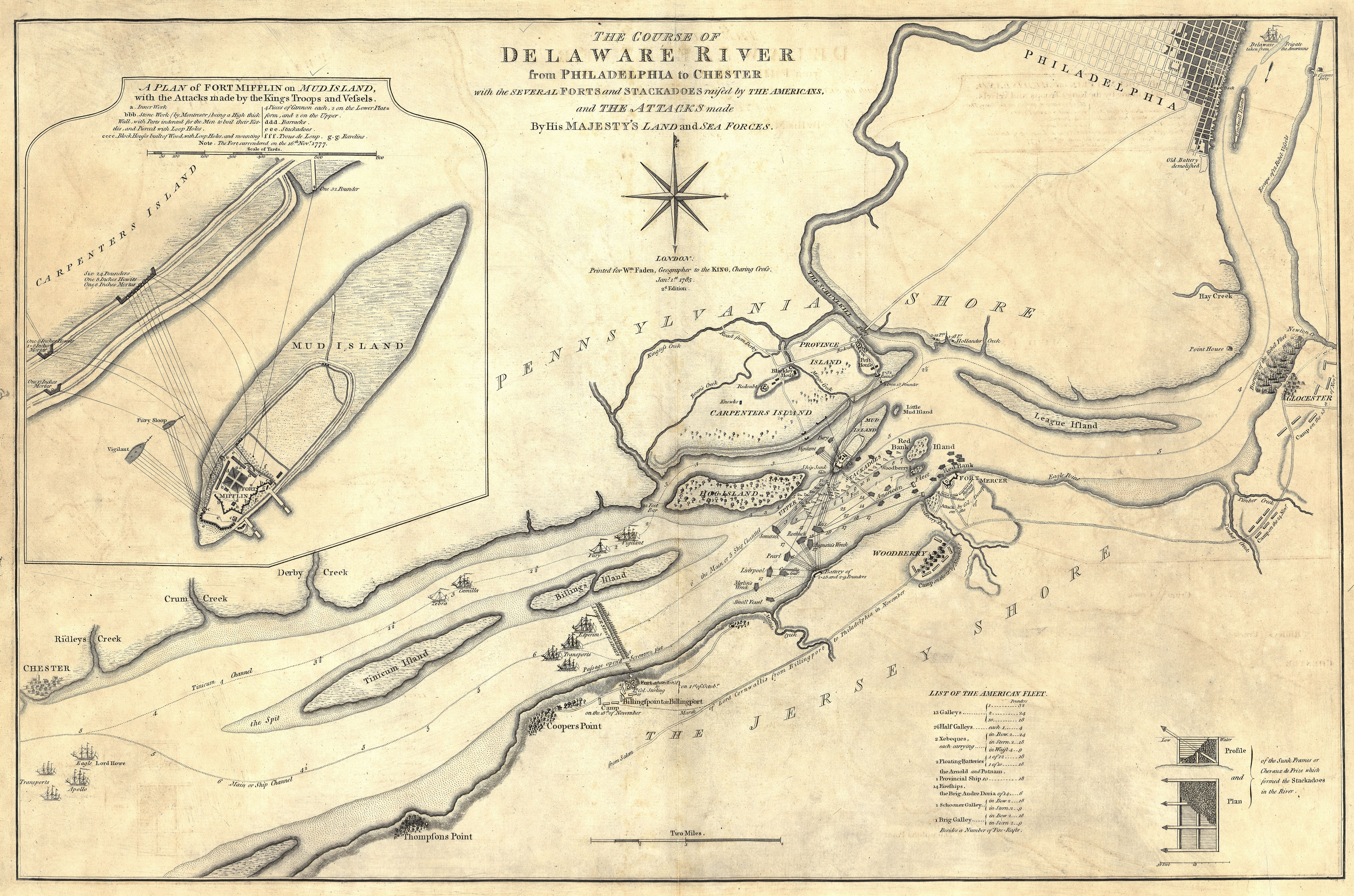
British map of Fort Mercer on the Delaware River

Von Donop, whose attack had been repulsed at the Second Battle of Trenton, was eager to avenge what he considered to be a humiliation. He declared to his men, "Either that will be Fort Donop or I shall be dead."

Donop soon realized the arduous task that was entrusted to him and asked Howe in vain for more artillery, but Howe ordered him to wait for the British fleet to come up river to assist him, and that if Donop could not capture the fort the British would, an order that apparently belittled Donop.

On October 20, 1777, four British warships under the command of Captain Hamond, HMS Roebuck made their way through where the lower chevaux-de-frise had been and sailed up the river. Among these vessels were HMS Augusta, outfitted with 64 guns and commanded by Captain Francis Reynolds. The Augusta however ran aground as the obstacles in the river had altered channel and much fire from the fort and floating batteries was directed against her, being prevented from re-floating on following the tide by a fresh north wind.

Von Donop divided his force into two groups totaling 1,200 men for a two-pronged attack upon the fort on the morning of October 22. Von Donop and Hessian grenadie battalion von Linsing were to attack the southern part of the fort, while Colonel Friedrich Ludwig von Minnigerode's grenadiers and Lieutenant Colonel Werner von Mirbach's infantry were to attack the northern and eastern approaches.

With four British frigates in the river to support the attack, von Donop was convinced that the fort would be in his hands by nightfall. After a cannonade by the Hessian artillery, Colonel von Linsingen moved against the nine-foot-tall southern parapet, but his men were cut down by devastating cannon and musket fire and were forced to retreat. On the north, Minnigerode's grenadiers managed to scale the ramparts of an abandoned section of the fort. But when they moved on they were confronted by a tangled mass of felled trees with pointed branches, a kind of abatis, protecting the main wall of the fort. With little in the way of proper tools, they were soon spotted trying to claw their way through the barricade and were fired upon by the Americans waiting for them on the other side.

The Continental and Pennsylvania navies provided enfilading fire against the Hessians. Suffering heavy casualties, the Hessians began to retreat, falling back to their camp ten miles (16 km) away in the village of Haddonfield which they had taken after landing at nearby Cooper's Ferry. Von Donop was wounded in the thigh during the southern attack and was left on the battlefield by his retreating troops. Mortally wounded, von Donop died three days later in the Joseph Low house in Woodbury and was buried at the site of the battle.

To make matters worse for the British and Hessians, the six British men-of-war were engaged by smaller American gunboats. During the engagement, two of the men-of-war, the 64-gun ship-of-the-line HMS Augusta and the sloop of war HMS Merlin ran aground on a shoal trying to avoid underwater chevaux-de-frise or stockades, placed in the river to pierce the hulls of intruding British ships. Overnight attempts to free the ships were unsuccessful. Fort Mifflin and the Pennsylvania State Navy engaged the stranded ships the next morning, with cannons and fire rafts, respectively. Augusta eventually was set on fire due to unknown reasons, and within an hour the fire reached the magazine, causing the ship to explode with such force that the explosion was heard in Philadelphia.

Augusta was the only British ship of the line lost in combat with American forces in both the Revolutionary War and War of 1812. Accounts vary as to the cause of the fire. In one account, the loss of Augusta was attributed to mistakes by her crew. Historian James Fenimore Cooper claims that the sides of the hull of the Augusta were packed with hay to repel musket and cannon shot, and during the exchange the hay caught fire although perhaps fanciful. Testimony from surviving crew members was indefinite as to the cause. None remembered having seen or heard the explosion of any powder on the decks. Only Midshipman Reid ventured to suppose that the fire originated from the cannon wads. Admiral Lord Howe seemed to accept this explanation. Soon after, the crew of Merlin was ordered to abandon the ship and destroy it also.

== Aftermath ==
The Hessian army reported casualties of 377 killed and wounded with 20 missing or captured, while the Americans reported their losses at 14 killed and 27 wounded. Frustrated by the failure to capture Fort Mercer, Howe ordered the Hessian regiments withdrawn from New Jersey while he made plans to attack Fort Mifflin by a massive artillery bombardment. By early November the British artillery batteries on Providence Island were complete, and a number of warships were available in support. On November 10, 1777, the British opened a full-scale bombardment of Fort Mifflin which lasted for five days. Six British warships, with two small floating batteries, HMS Vigilant and HMS Fury, also joined the bombardment to rake Fort Mifflin at close range.

After five days, 250 of the original 400 American defenders had been reported as casualties and ammunition at the fort was running low. The commanding officer of Fort Mifflin, Major Simeon Thayer, ordered the fort abandoned on the evening of November 15. The remaining defenders were evacuated to Fort Mercer, but they left the American flag flying over Fort Mifflin. The next morning, a small party of British troops landed unopposed at the deserted fort, tore down the American flag, and ran up the Union Jack. The bombardment of Fort Mifflin came at minimal cost to the British with only a reported 13 sailors and troops killed, 24 more wounded, and the loss of two ships, HMS Augusta and HMS Merlin.

Howe then sent Lord Cornwallis with 2,000 men to attack Fort Mercer, landing them by ferry at Billingsport, three miles (4.8 km) to the south. Rather than allow the garrison to be captured in an overwhelming British assault, Colonel Christopher Greene decided to abandon the fort on November 20, and the British seized it the following day. Washington's scheme of starving the British out of Philadelphia failed with the loss of the two forts, leaving luring the British out of Philadelphia into another major land battle at his camp at nearby White Marsh as his last feasible military option. Although Howe did sortie from the city to launch a feint at the American camp in early December, he felt the American position was too strong and returned to Philadelphia until the next spring. Washington then moved his army to Valley Forge, where they camped for the winter.

The 1st Rhode Island Regiment, also known as Varnum's Regiment, the 9th Continental Regiment, the Black Regiment, the Rhode Island Regiment, and Olney's Battalion, fought with the Americans. The regiment had in its ranks several free or formerly enslaved African-Americans and Native Americans. In early 1778 the regiment also enlisted a number of enslaved African-Americans with their masters being paid fair market value for their slave upon completion of the war, at which time the enslaved person would be freed.

== Historical legacy ==
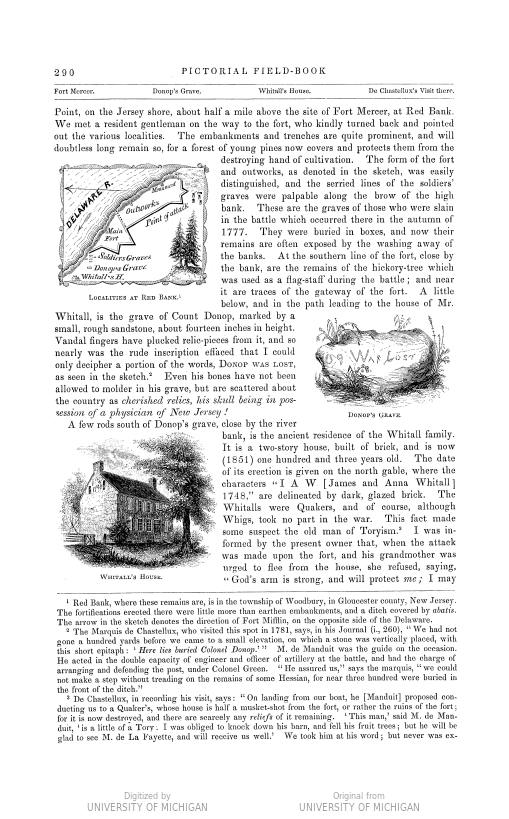
Von Donop Gravesite Battlefield of Red Bank

The site of the Battle of Red Bank is a part of the Gloucester County, New Jersey Parks system called Red Bank Battlefield Park.

The 44-acre (180,000 m^{2}) park is open to visitors during daylight hours. The Whitall House may be visited during more limited hours. An annual reenactment of the battle takes place on the park grounds in October. In the early 1980s, a lifeguard was on duty and swimming was permitted in the Delaware River.

In June 2022, a mass grave containing the remains of what are believed to be 12 Hessian soldiers was discovered while excavating the outer defensive ditch of Fort Mercer.

There is a historical marker at the battlefield that tells the story of the African American, enslaved people, and Native Americans who fought alongside the Americans with the 1st Rhode Island Regiment.

== See also ==
- Siege of Fort Mifflin
- Fort Billingsport
- Benjamin Loxley
- List of American Revolutionary War battles

== Bibliography ==
- "African American Soldiers – Red Bank Battlefield". hmdb.org.
- Catts, Wade (2025). "Memorialization, Reconstruction, Erosion, and Sham Battles: Multiple Ways of Remembering the Battle of Fort Mercer, New Jersey." The Archeology of the American Revolution, ed. Richard F. Veit and Matthew A. Kalos. Gainesville: University Press of Florida. ISBN 978-0-8130-7941-7.
- Chartrand, René (2016). Forts of the American Revolution 1775–83. Osprey Publishing Ltd. ISBN 978-1-4728-1445-6.
- Cooper, James Fenimore (1848). History of the Navy of the United States of America. Cooperstown: Published by H. & E. Phinney.
- Dorwart, Jeffery M. (1998). Fort Mifflin of Philadelphia: An Illustrated History. University of Pennsylvania Press. ISBN 978-0-8122-1644-8.
- Jackson, John W. (1977).The Delaware Bay and River Defenses of Philadelphia, 1775–1777.
- Janofsky, Jennifer (2025). "'All This Appears to Be Forgotten Now': Memory, Race, and Commemoration at Red Bank Battlefield." The Archeology of the American Revolution, ed. Richard F. Veit and Matthew A. Kalos. Gainesville: University Press of Florida. ISBN 978-0-8130-7941-7.
- McGuire, Thomas J. (2006). The Philadelphia Campaign: Germantown and the Roads to Valley Forge. Vol. 2. Mechanicsburg, PA: Stackpole Books. pp. 125–180. ISBN 978-0-8117-0206-5.
- McGeorge, Wallace (1905). The battle of Red Bank, resulting in the defeat of the Hessians and the destruction of the British frigate Augusta, Oct. 22 and 23, 1777. Camden, New Jersey, Sinnickson Chew, printers.
- Miller, Nathan (2000). Broadsides. Wiley. ISBN 978-0-7858-2022-2.
- Selig, Robert A. (2019). African Americans, the Rhode Island Regiments, and the Battle of Fort Red Bank, 22 October 1777. New Jersey Historical Commission, Trenton, NJ.
- Symonds, Craig L. (1986). A Battlefield Atlas of the American Revolution. The National & Aviation Publishing Company of America, Inc. ISBN 0-933852-53-3
- The pictorial field-book of the Revolution. Vol. II. New York, Harper & Brothers. 1851–1852.
- "The story of the battle of Red Bank". friendsofredbank. Friends of Red Ban Battlefield.
