= HMS Roebuck (1774) =

1774 ship of the Royal Navy

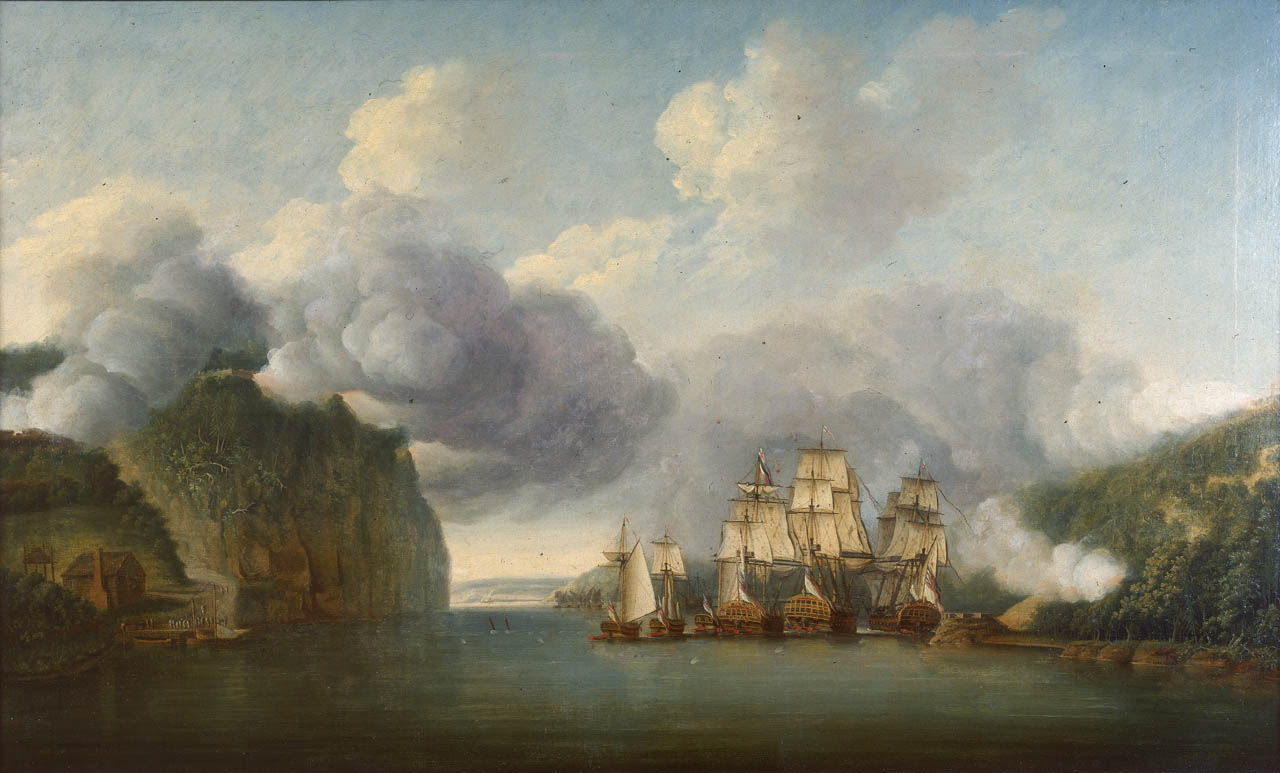
- Roebuck with Phoenix, Tartar and three smaller vessels passing forts Washington and Lee on the Hudson River

History

Great Britain
- Name: HMS Roebuck
- Ordered: 30 November 1769
- Cost: £18,911.0.6d
- Laid down: October 1770
- Launched: 24 April 1774
- Completed: 4 August 1775
- Fate: Broken up 1811

General characteristics
- Class & type: Fifth-rate
- Tons burthen: 879 26/94 (bm)
- Length: 140 feet (42.7 m) (gundeck); 115 feet 9 inches (35.3 m) (keel)
- Beam: 37 feet 9 1/2 inches (11.5 m)
- Depth of hold: 16 feet 4 inches (5 m)
- Propulsion: Sails
- Sail plan: Fully-rigged ship
- Complement: 280–300
- Armament: Lower deck: 20 × 18-pounder guns; Upper deck: 22 × 9-pounder guns; (later upgraded to 12-pounder guns); Quarterdeck: nil; Forecastle: 2 × 6-pounder guns

HMS Roebuck was a 44-gun fifth-rate warship of the Royal Navy which served in the American and French Revolutionary Wars. Designed in 1769 by Sir Thomas Slade to operate in the shallower waters of North America, she joined Lord Howe's squadron towards the end of 1775 and took part in operations against New York the following year. She engaged the American gun batteries at Red Hook during the Battle of Long Island in August 1776, and forced a passage up the Hudson River in October. On 25 August 1777, Roebuck escorted troopships to Turkey Point, Maryland, where an army was landed for an assault on Philadelphia. She was again called upon to accompany troopships in December 1779, this time for an attack on Charleston. When the ships-of-the-line, which were too large to enter the harbour, were sent back to New York, Admiral Marriot Arbuthnot made Roebuck his flagship. She was, therefore, at the front of the attack, leading the British squadron across the shoal to engage Fort Moultrie and the American ships beyond.

After the American Revolutionary War ended in October 1783, Roebuck underwent repairs at Sheerness and was refitted as a hospital ship. She served in this capacity during the French Revolutionary war and was with the British fleet under Vice-Admiral Sir John Jervis that captured Martinique, Guadeloupe and St Lucia in 1794. Recommissioned as a troopship in July 1799, during the War of the Second Coalition, Roebuck joined the Anglo-Russian invasion of Holland and was part of the fleet, under the command of Vice-Admiral Sir Andrew Mitchell, to which the Dutch surrendered in the Vlieter Incident. Following the Treaty of Amiens in March 1802, Roebuck was paid off and laid up in ordinary at Woolwich Dockyard. When the War of the Third Coalition broke out in May 1803, she was brought back into service as a guardship at Leith, flying the flags of Vice-Admiral Richard Rodney Bligh and then Rear-Admiral James Vashon under whom she later transferred to Great Yarmouth. In March 1806, she became a receiving ship and in 1810 the flagship of Lord Gardner. Roebuck was broken up at Sheerness in July 1811.

== Construction and armament ==
Roebuck was the prototype of the Roebuck-class ships, two-deck, fifth-rate ships built to operate in the shallower waters of North America. (Note: The design was so successful, the Admiralty requested four more within a year of Roebuck's launch. By September 1781, a total of nineteen Roebuck-class ships had been ordered.) She was designed by renowned naval architect Sir Thomas Slade in 1769 as an improvement on his Phoenix model, and ordered by the Admiralty on 30 November. Her keel of 115 feet 9 inches (35.3 m) was laid down in October the following year at Chatham Dockyard.

As built, Roebuck was 140 feet (42.7 m) long at the gundeck, with a beam of 37 feet 9 1/2 inches (11.5 m) and a depth in the hold of 16 feet 4 inches (5 m). She measured 879 26/94 tons burthen. Launched on 24 April 1774 and completed by 4 August 1775, Roebuck cost £18,911.0.6d plus a further £1,749.5.5d for fitting.

Roebuck was built with two rows of windows in the stern, giving the illusion of an extra deck, but behind them was a single-level cabin. The design was eventually phased out for Roebuck-class ships completed after HMS Dolphin. Most of the remaining ships of the class had a traditional frigate-style stern.

On her lower gun deck, Roebuck carried twenty 18-pounder (8.2 kg) guns. Her upper deck originally had twenty-two 9-pounder (4.1 kg) guns but these were later upgraded to 12-pounder (5.4 kg) guns. There were two 6-pounder (2.7 kg) guns on the forecastle but the quarterdeck was devoid of armament. When fully manned, Roebuck had a complement of 280 officers and enlisted men. This was increased to 300 in 1783.

== Service ==
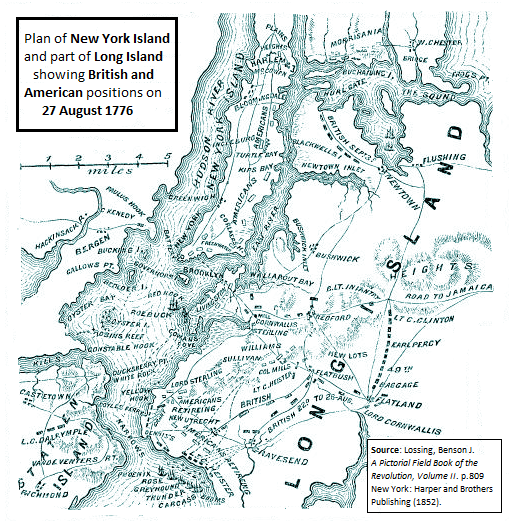
Map marking British and American positions at the Battle of Long Island. Roebuck is shown bombarding an American battery at Red Hook

=== American Revolutionary War ===
First commissioned by Captain Andrew Snape Hamond in July 1775, Roebuck left for North America in September, joining Lord Howe's squadron and taking part in operations against New York the following year. On 25 March 1776, she was cruising alone off Cape Henlopen when she ran aground. She suffered no damage, enabling her crew to get her off and into deep water where she was anchored. The following day, a sail was sighted in the bay and Hamond sent two of the ship's boats to investigate. The craft turned out to be a small American schooner, which the crew abandoned on seeing the British boats approaching. The newly acquired prize and Roebuck's tender then pursued and caught two sloops. On 28 March, Roebuck's boats were again in action, taking another sloop. In the afternoon, her tender narrowly avoided capture by the American 10-gun sloop Hornet. On hearing of the encounter, Roebuck set off in pursuit of the American vessel but was unable to locate her.

Roebuck took part in the Battle of Long Island on 27 August 1776, attacking the American gun batteries at Red Hook. On 9 October she was in action on the Hudson River, with HMS Phoenix and HMS Tartar, where she destroyed two armed galleys and forced her way upstream, whilst engaging, on either side, the two forts of Washington and Lee. Between 10 March and 21 December 1776, Howe's squadron captured or destroyed 166 vessels, of which Roebuck claimed partial responsibility for at least twenty-three. In April 1777, she took two warships, the 14-gun Carolina State Navy Defence and the 10-gun USS Sachem.

In August 1777, the British were planning to land an army at the head of the Elk River with the object of securing Philadelphia. Because of Hamond's familiarity with the local waters, Roebuck, which had hitherto been involved in operations on the Delaware River, was withdrawn to mark out a channel through Chesapeake Bay for Howe's 267-strong flotilla. Roebuck, with the 32-gun Apollo and four smaller vessels, escorted the troopships up the river on 25 August and provided cover while the army disembarked about six miles (9.7 km) from Turkey Point. (Note: The four other vessels were Sphynx and Vigilant, both of 20 guns, the 16-gun Senegal, and the 14-gun Swift.)

==== Assault on Philadelphia ====
Following the defeat of an American force at the Battle of Brandywine and its subsequent retreat to Philadelphia in September, Howe led Roebuck and a squadron of small vessels up the Delaware where the Americans had erected redoubts overlooking the river and sunk obstructions to prevent its navigation. At Billingsport, a large earthworks and gun battery protected a channel, blocked with a submerged cheval de frise. This impediment was constructed of large wooden frames, filled with stones and fronting iron-tipped spears. Stationed along the river were floating batteries and gunboats, and 3 miles (4.8 km) further upstream, another set of obstacles had been sunk between Fort Mifflin and Fort Mercer.

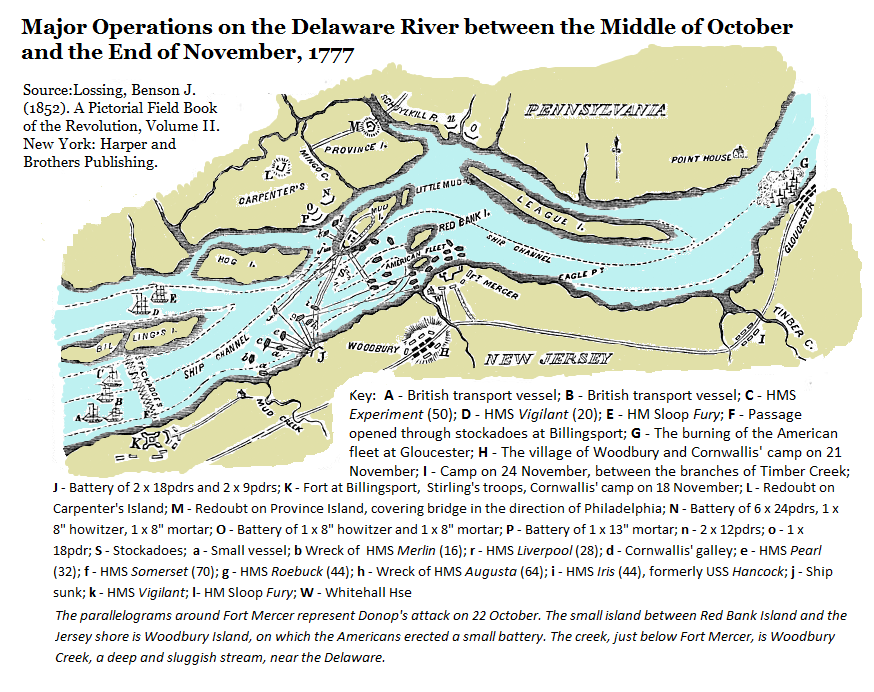
British chart showing American defences on the Delaware in 1777. Roebuck is shown attacking a battery opposite Hog Island before travelling up the river to engage the American fleet

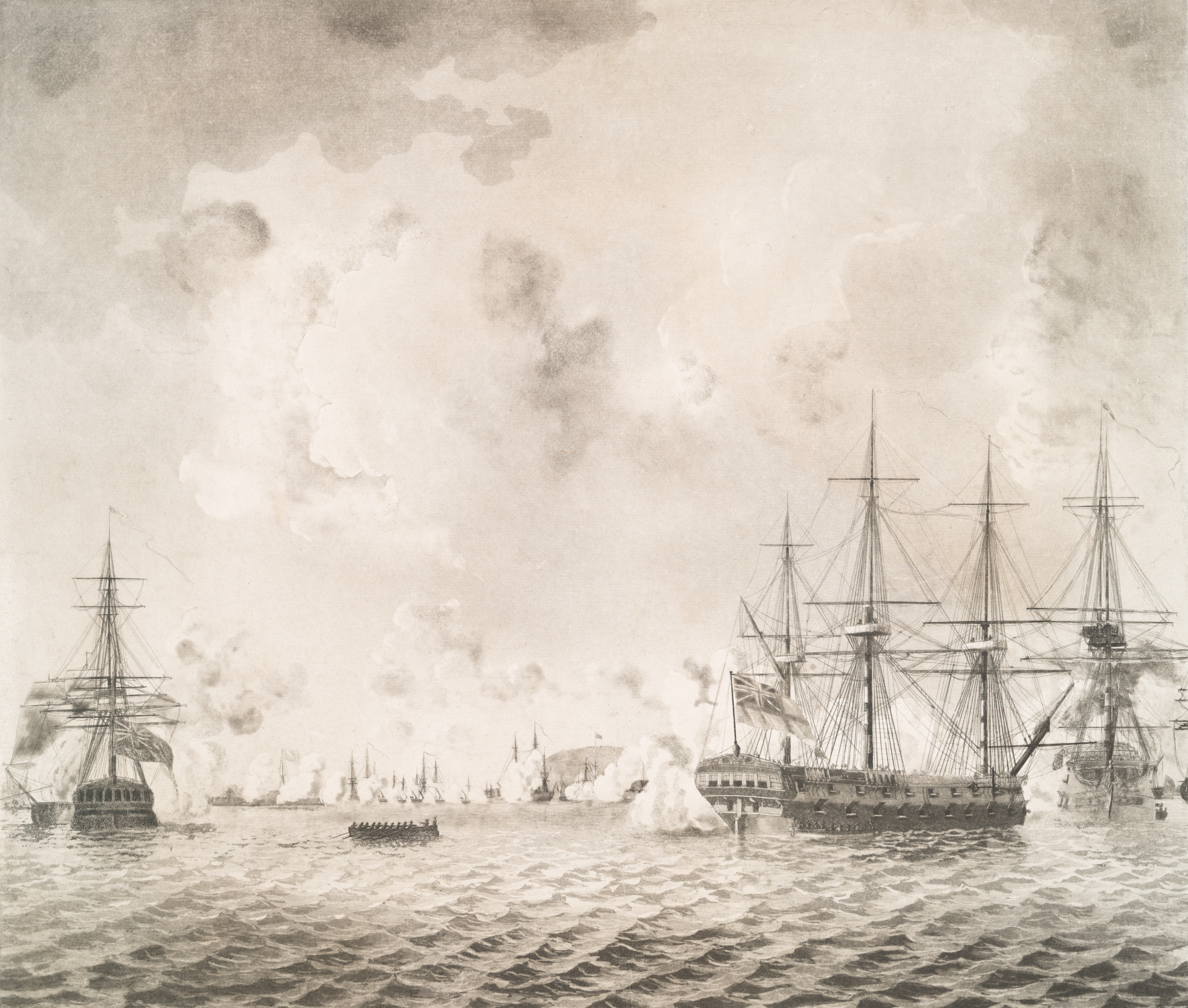
Roebuck (second from right) at the action off Mud Fort on 15 November 1777

The British captured Philadelphia on 26 September but control of the river was crucial to keeping their forces there supplied. Hamond offered to force a channel at Billing's Point, if Howe could muster sufficient men to put the fort there out of action. Two regiments from Chester, Pennsylvania, crossed the river and chased off the American garrison while the men of Roebuck breached a seven-foot (2.1 m) opening for Roebuck, Augusta, two frigates, a sloop and a galley to sail through. After unsuccessful attempts to take the forts Mifflin and Mercer, the six British vessels were subjected to heavy fire when they engaged the American flotilla at the Battle of Red Bank. Augusta ran aground and caught fire, and the sloop, Merlin, blew up; Roebuck and the remaining force broke off the attack and returned to Billingsport.

Still requiring a supply route to Philadelphia but unable to open up the Delaware while Fort Mifflin was occupied, Howe took possession of Province Island in November and began erecting gun batteries. Following a six-day bombardment, the Americans abandoned the fort. Two days later Fort Mercer also fell, leaving the British free to work their way upriver in pursuit of the enemy fleet which was later scuttled at Gloucester. By 18 May 1778, Roebuck was in Philadelphia where she took part in celebrations, held in honour of Howe and his brother William who was Commander-in-Chief of the British land forces.

In July 1778, Roebuck was at Sandy Hook, near New York Bay, and in August she took part in an action against a French fleet. France had entered the war on the American side in February that year. On 29 July, the French fleet from Toulon, commanded by Charles Hector, comte d'Estaing, arrived in Narragansett Bay, and the next day they began raiding British positions on Conanicut and Goat Island. On 8 August, 4,000 French soldiers and sailors were landed to reinforce the 10,000 American troops who had just crossed from the mainland to attack the British garrison on Rhode Island. Howe's fleet arrived off Point Judith on 9 August and, fearing the British might soon be reinforced, d'Estaing sailed out the next morning while he still had superior numbers and guns. Several days of manoeuvring, in which both parties sought the weather gage, were curtailed by a violent gale which scattered the fleets. The storm abated on 13 August, leaving Roebuck, Apollo, Centurion, Ardent, Richmond, Vigilant, and Phoenix within sight of each other. Apollo, then serving as Howe's flagship, had lost two masts during the previous night and Roebuck, also with a mast missing, was ordered to escort her to Sandy Hook. Howe moved his flag to Phoenix and, after searching for the French fleet, followed a few days later.

Roebuck captured an American privateer in February 1779, before setting sail for Woolwich where she underwent a refit and had her hull sheathed in copper. This took until April.

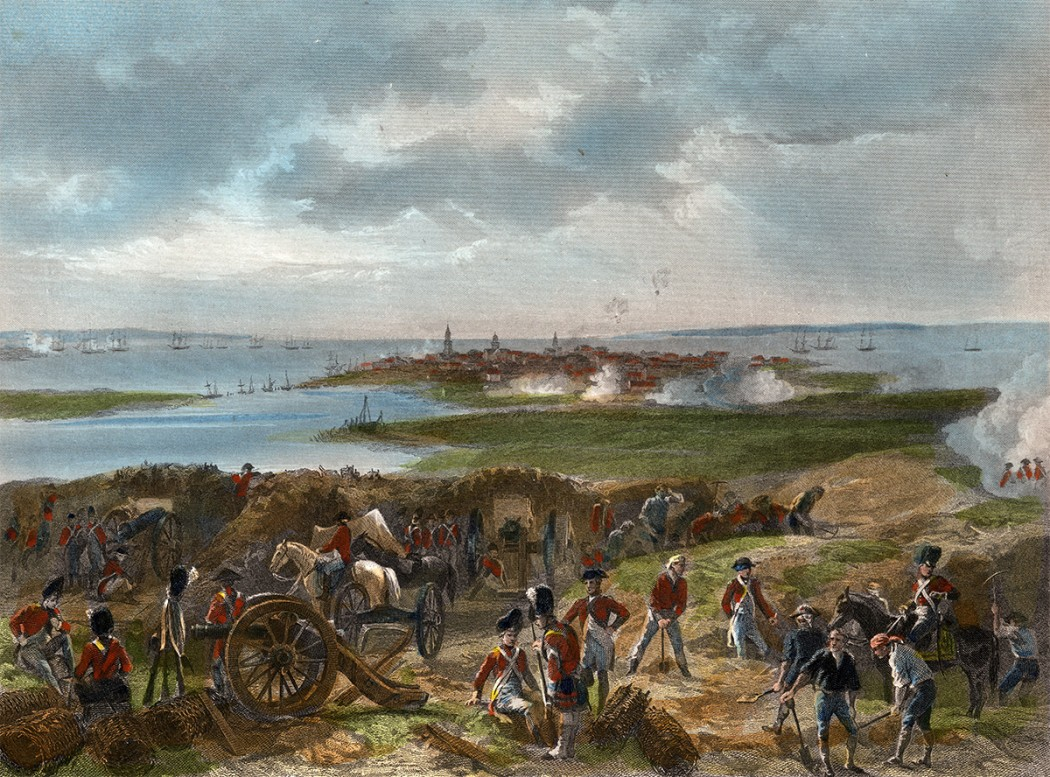
Siege of Charleston

==== Operations against Charleston ====
Roebuck returned to American waters by 5 December 1779, when she captured the American privateer, Lady Washington. Then, with five ships-of-the-line, the 50-gun Renown, the 44-gun Romulus, four sixth-rate frigates and two 20-gun sloops, she accompanied transports, carrying 7,550 troops for an attack on Charleston. Under the command of Admiral Marriot Arbuthnot, the ships left New York on 26 December and in January 1780, in need of repairs, called in at Savannah, captured by the British the previous month. From there, the convoy proceeded to the North Edisto River where the army disembarked on 10 February. The troops marched the 30 miles (48 km) overland and occupied James Island, while the ships sailed to the entrance and effected a blockade of Charleston harbour. Some of Roebuck's company were among the 450 seamen and marines later sent to lay siege to the town. The 64-gun and 74-gun ships-of-the-line, being too large to be of any use in the shallow waters around the harbour, left for New York in March 1780, leaving Renown, Romulus, Blonde, Raleigh, Perseus, Camilla, and Roebuck, to which Arbuthnot moved his flag. These ships were lightened while they awaited a high enough tide and favourable conditions to carry them over the sandbank which lay across the entrance to the harbour.

On 9 April Roebuck led the squadron across the bar. An exchange of heavy fire while passing Fort Moultrie resulted in considerable damage to the masts and rigging of the British ships and the loss of 27 lives. The expedition continued to James Island and anchored, whereupon it came under attack from the batteries at Charleston. Some of the shot passed right through Roebuck but she did not return fire. Consequently, she was thought to be out of range and the bombardment soon stopped. An American naval force which included the frigates Providence, Boston and Queen of France, Bricole of 44 guns, a large polacca and two armed brigs were to oppose the British fleet at Fort Moultrie but instead retired to the Cooper River where some were scuttled. (Note: The ships sunk in the Cooper River were Truite, Notre Dame, Queen of France, Bricole and some smaller vessels. All were stripped of their armament which was used to reinforce the American batteries. Boston, Providence, Ranger and the galleys were taken to Charleston where some of the guns were removed to form additional defences for the town.) This action later denied the British control of the river; on 7 May, they instead landed seamen and marines near Mount Pleasant, where they captured a battery and went on to force the surrender of Fort Moultrie. Some of Roebuck's crew were used in these land operations. The town capitulated on 11 May and the remaining American ships were subsequently captured. The crew of Roebuck were awarded a share of the prize money for the frigates Boston and Providence. Hamond was ordered to England with dispatches on 15 May 1780, and was succeeded in command of Roebuck by his nephew, Andrew Snape Douglas.

==== Blockade duty ====
Roebuck was absent from the fleet during a violent storm on 23 January 1781. The British had been blockading the French in Newport and were still repairing their weather-beaten ships on 8 February, when Arbuthnot received information that a French 64-gun ship and two frigates had left Rhode Island for Virginia. He immediately dispatched HMS Charlestown (the captured and renamed USS Boston) to find Roebuck, Chatham and Romulus, which he knew to be somewhere off Carolina with some frigates, and ordered them to intercept. The message was received too late, however, and Romulus was thus alone and unaware, when she was captured by the French squadron returning from its aborted mission.

While Roebuck was cruising with HMS Orpheus off the coast of Delaware on 14 April 1781, they captured the 36-gun frigate, USS Confederacy. She had been on her way from the West Indies to Washington with supplies for the Continental Army. Taken into service as HMS Confederate, she became, at that time, the largest 36-gun ship in the Royal Navy. The following month, Roebuck was with HMS Medea when they captured the 28-gun Protector near Sandy Hook. Douglas received another commission in July and was replaced by Captain John Orde. In the summer of 1781, Roebuck set sail for Europe with Arbuthnot, who was to be redeployed, and dispatches from Sir Henry Clinton and Lord Rawdon. She briefly returned to American waters where she captured the French privateer Providence on 24 February 1782. Afterwards, she was sent to the North Sea station where she finished her war service, paying off in April 1783.

=== French Revolutionary Wars ===
The 1794 invasion of Martinique, during which Roebuck served as a hospital ship

After a survey in October 1783, Roebuck underwent repairs at Sheerness which took until February 1785 and cost £11,038.0.10d. In June 1790, Roebuck was recommissioned as a hospital ship and, following renewed hostilities with France in the War of the First Coalition, served in this capacity at the capture of Martinique in March 1794. On 2 February a British fleet under Vice-admiral Sir John Jervis and 6,100 troops under Lieutenant-general Sir Charles Grey left Barbados. The troops were landed on Martinique on 5 February and by 16 March had gained control of the whole island, save the town of Fort Royal and the forts Bourbon and Louis. Seaman and marines from the fleet then joined the troops in laying siege to the town and the forts. The whole of Martinique had surrendered by 22 March. Leaving a contingent to hold the island, the British left for St Lucia on 31 March, capturing it on 4 April. Jervis then took his fleet to Guadeloupe, forcing the capitulation of Grande-Terre and Basse-Terre on 12 and 20 April respectively. The British were ousted from St Lucia by the French the following year, but in May 1796, Roebuck returned, part of a force that repossessed it.

==== Anglo-Dutch War ====
The French intervention in the Dutch Republic and subsequent exile of William V, Prince of Orange in January 1795 led to the formation of the French-allied Batavian Republic, upon which Britain immediately declared war. Roebuck was serving in support of the war in the Leeward Islands, under Rear Admiral Henry Harvey, when on 6 July 1797, she captured Batave, a Dutch 10-gun privateer, just off Barbados. (Note: Also listed as Bataaf with 12 guns.) More captures followed in February 1798; a brig William and a schooner Betsey were captured on 8 February but both were later condemned by a prize court. While cruising off Martinique on 19 February, Roebuck fell in with and captured a French 10-gun privateer, Parfait. Arriving in Deptford in November 1798, Roebuck was refitted as a troopship, at a cost of £10,044. She was recommissioned in July 1799.

Roebuck was part of the fleet, under the command of Vice-Admiral Sir Andrew Mitchell, that took part in the Anglo-Russian Invasion of Holland and to which the Dutch surrendered in the Vlieter roadstead on 30 August 1799. Two days previous, the fleet had captured four Dutch ships and two hulks in Hollands Diep. Believing Dutch public opinion was against the republic and in favour of restoring the monarchy, the British government began preparing an invasion force as early as June. Comprising 27,000 men and 250 vessels, the force arrived off the Dutch coast under a flag of truce on 21 August. Terms were not agreed however and British troops were landed on 27 August. The fortifications at Den Helder were captured the next day and the ships in the Diep were taken. Mitchell's squadron entered the Vlieter on the morning of 30 August. The Dutch fleet within surrendered without a shot being fired on either side.

On 12 November 1799 Roebuck arrived in the Downs with 500 men of the 20th Regiment of Foot after a 12-day passage from Holland in bad weather.

Roebuck and HMS Dictator left Plymouth for Cork, Ireland, on 31 January 1800 with the 46th (South Devon) Foot Regiment. They returned to England with HMS Trusty on 24 March, having carried the 54th Regiment from Ireland to Portsmouth. Roebuck left there on 9 April with a convoy for the Downs.

Between March and September 1801, Roebuck was involved in operations against Egypt. Because Roebuck served in the navy's Egyptian campaign (8 March to 2 September 1801), her officers and crew qualified for the clasp "Egypt" to the Naval General Service Medal, which the Admiralty issued in 1847 to all surviving claimants.

=== Napoleonic Wars ===
On 21 March 1802 Roebuck, armed en flute, came into Portsmouth from the Mediterranean and immediately went into quarantine. She was carrying the Queen's German Regiment (96th Regiment of Foot).

The Treaty of Amiens was ratified in March 1802 and two months later Roebuck was paid off and laid up in ordinary at Woolwich Dockyard. The peace was short-lived; hostilities resumed in May 1803, and in July Roebuck was recommissioned as a guardship at Leith. She served in this capacity as the flagship of Vice-Admiral Richard Rodney Bligh between November and the following February. Between April and October 1805, she flew the flag of Rear-Admiral James Vashon, first at Leith, then from September at Great Yarmouth. In March 1806, she became a receiving ship, flying the flag of Lord Gardner from some point in 1810 until she was broken up at Sheerness Dockyard in July 1811.

== Prizes ==
Vessels captured or destroyed for which Roebuck's crew received full or partial credit
Date	Ship	Nationality	Type	Fate	Ref.
March to December 1776	Maria	American	Not recorded	Captured	
March to December 1776	Grace	American	Not recorded	Captured	
March to December 1776	Not recorded	American	Sloop	Destroyed	
March to December 1776	Not recorded	American	Pilot boat	Destroyed	
27 March 1776	Polly	American	Sloop	Captured	
27 March 1776	Not recorded	American	Sloop	Captured	
28 March 1776	Dove	American	Sloop	Destroyed off Cape Henlopen	
29 March 1776	Dolphin	American	Sloop	Destroyed off Cape Henlopen	
29 March 1776	Betsey	American	Sloop	Destroyed off Cape Henlopen	
March to December 1776	Sally	American	Not recorded	Destroyed off Cape Henlopen	
March to April 1776	Chance	American	Ship	Captured	
March to April 1776	Juno	Not recorded	Brig	Captured	
March to December 1776	Dove	American	Not recorded	Cut-out from Egg Harbour	
March to December 1776	Cazia	Not recorded	Not recorded	Captured	
March to April 1776	Dolphin	American	Schooner	Captured	
March to April 1776	Ranger	American	Pilot vessel	Captured	
December 1776	Little John	American	Schooner	Captured	
March to December 1776	Dolphin	American	Merchant vessel	Captured	
March to December 1776	Suzannah	American	Merchant vessel	Captured	
December 1776	Pigeon	American	Sloop	Captured	
March to December 1776	Success	American	Merchant vessel	Captured	
March to December 1776	Two Friends	American	Not recorded	Captured	
December 1776	Adventure	American	Brigantine	Captured	
March to December 1776	Delight	American	Merchant vessel	Captured	
March to December 1776	New York	American	Brig	Captured	
9 October 1776	Independence	American	Galley	Destroyed in North River	
9 October 1776	Crane	American	Galley	Destroyed in North River	
January 1777	Speedwell	American	Sloop	Captured	
January 1777	Peggy	American	Sloop	Captured	
3 January 1777	Betsey	American	Sloop	Captured	
2 April 1777	Defense	American	Brigantine	Captured	
5 April 1777	Sachem	American	Privateer	Captured	
16 April 1777	Brothers	Not recorded	Brig	Captured off Anguilla	
1 June 1777	General Washington	American	Schooner	Captured	
2 June 1777	Empereur	French	Brig	Captured	
3 June 1777	Polly	American	Sloop	Captured	
5 June 1777	Not recorded	American	Schooner	Burnt	
5 June 1777	Not recorded	American	Schooner	Burnt	
5 June 1777	Not recorded	American	Schooner	Burnt	
4 July 1777	Hero	American	Brig	Captured	
4 July 1777	Sally	American	Brig	Captured	
4 July 1777	Jenny	American	Sloop	Captured	
4 July 1777	Polly	American	Schooner	Captured	
4 July 1777	Polly	American	Sloop	Burnt	
4 July 1777	Mary	American	Sloop	Burnt	
4 July 1777	Not recorded	American	Sloop	Sunk	
4 July 1777	Sally	Not recorded	Sloop	Sunk	
4 July 1777	Liberty	American	Sloop	Captured	
15 August 1777	Rochester	Not recorded	Brig	Captured	
29 May 1778	Hope	British	Snow	Recaptured	
31 May 1778	General Hackman	American	Brig	Captured	
21 October 1778	Betsey	American	Sloop	Captured	
Before February 1779	Ann	Not recorded	Brig	Captured	
Before February 1779	Nancy	Not recorded	Brig	Captured	
Before February 1779	Kitty	Not recorded	Brig	Captured	
Before February 1779	Friendship	Not recorded	Schooner	Captured	
24 February 1779	Revenge	American	Privateer	Captured	
August to November 1779	Juene Francois	French	Snow	Captured off Newfoundland	
August to November 1779	Orient	Not recorded	Schooner	Captured	
29 October 1779	Revenge	American	Privateer	Captured	
5 December 1779	Lady Washington	American	Privateer	Captured	
April to November 1780	Henrico	Not recorded	Schooner	Captured	
12 May 1780	Boston	American	Frigate	Captured at Charleston	
12 May 1780	Providence	American	Frigate	Captured at Charleston	
Before June 1780	Adventure	American	Snow	Captured	
Before June 1780	Union	American	Schooner	Captured	
Before June 1780	Champion	American	Schooner	Captured	
Before June 1780	Little John	British	Schooner	Recaptured	
Before June 1780	Thomas	British	Snow	Recaptured	
Before June 1780	Mackerell	British	Ship	Recaptured	
Before June 1780	Marquis of Rockingham	British	Ship	Recaptured	
14 April 1781	Confederacy	American	Frigate	Captured	
6 May 1781	Protector	American	Frigate	Captured	
24 February 1782	Providence	French	Privateer	Captured	
6 July 1797	Batave	Dutch	Privateer	Captured	
8 February 1798	William	Not recorded	Brig	Captured, later condemned	
8 February 1798	Betsey	Not recorded	Schooner	Captured, later condemned	
19 February 1798	Parfait	French	Privateer	Captured	
28 August 1799	Drochterland	Dutch	Hulk	Captured in Hollands Diep	
28 August 1799	Brooderschap	Dutch	Hulk	Captured in Hollands Diep	
28 August 1799	Helder	Dutch	Ship	Captured in Hollands Diep	
28 August 1799	Venus	Dutch	Ship	Captured in Hollands Diep	
28 August 1799	Minerva	Dutch	Ship	Captured in Hollands Diep	
28 August 1799	Hector	Dutch	Ship	Captured in Hollands Diep	
