= Mingo Creek (Schuylkill River tributary) =

River in Philadelphia, Pennsylvania, United States

Mingo Creek is a tributary of the Schuylkill River between the Eastwick neighborhood and Philadelphia International Airport, in the United States.

== History ==
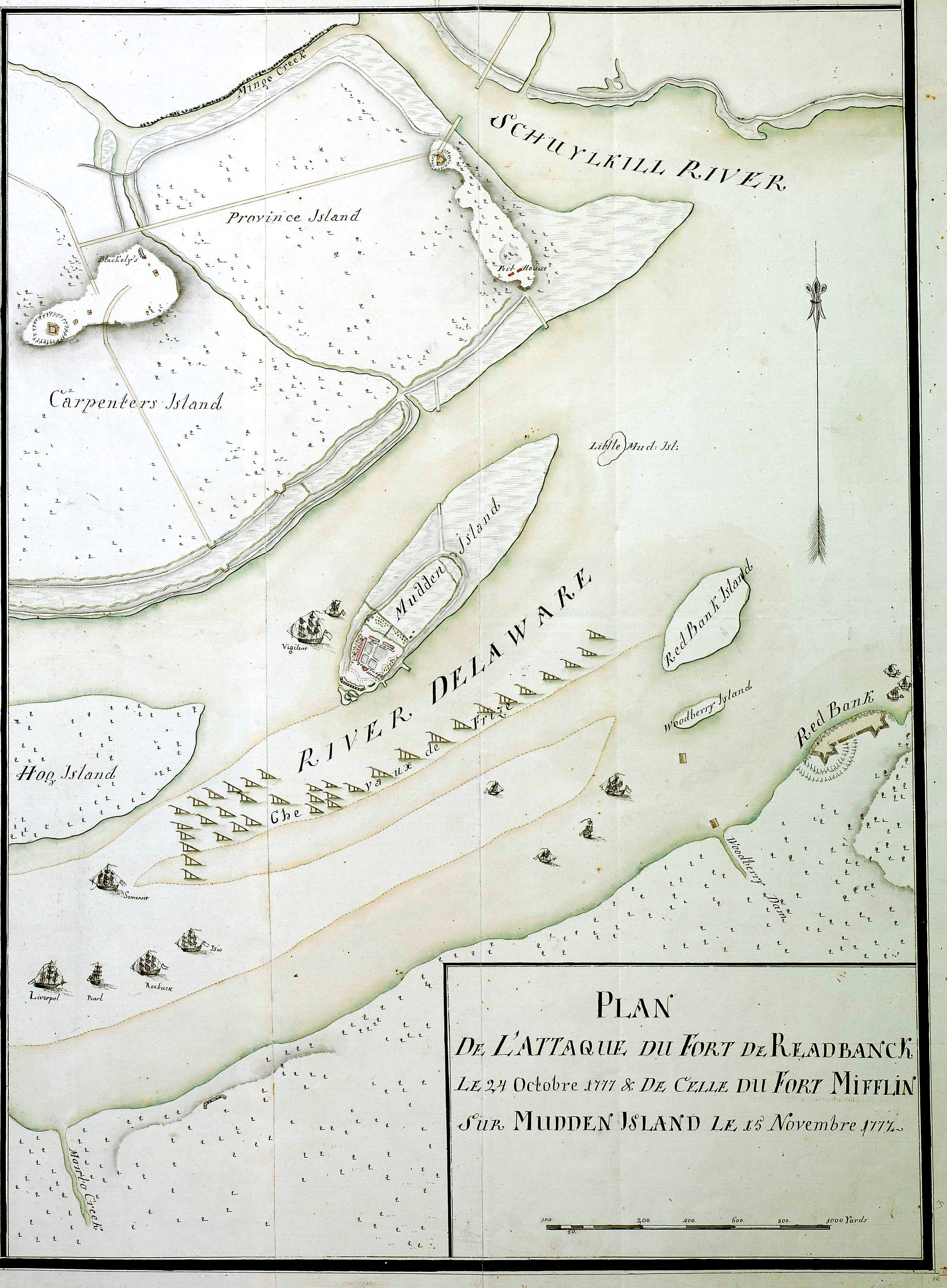
A 1777 Hessian map showing the campaign against Fort Mifflin and Fort Mercer. Mingo Creek can be seen on the upper left above Province Island.

Swedish settlers settled in the area of Mingo Creek in what would become New Sweden in 1638.

Historically, Mingo Creek was a tidal estuary among the marshlands of Philadelphia with a system of numerous creeks and streams that created a chain of islands. It was formed by the junction of Church, Eagle and Kingsessing creeks.

Eagle Creek, the southerly branch, diverted Province Island to the east and what was Carpenter's Island—or Sayamensing by the Lenape, to the west. Eagle Creek ran to the west down to the Delaware River. It was later diverted and then ran east for a short distance then in a southern direction into the Schuylkill near what was Mud Island (now Fort Mifflin). Much of its flow is diverted into a channel along Interstate 95 and the Southwest sewage treatment plant.

Church Creek, or Boon's Creek ran southwest through Carpenter's Island until what was once the former route of Essington Avenue. Running southwest into the now filled distributary of Darby Creek that formed the county line of Delaware and Philadelphia counties, Bow Creek. Bow Creek separated Tinicum and Carpenter's Island, running southeast into the back channel of Hog Island before emptying into the Delaware River. The stream was named after Andreas—or Andrew Boon, a settler. It was later renamed Church Creek as it was a route to a church located at Tinicum Island. Traces of this creek can be seen near the runways of the airport located at 39.8841°N 75.23862°W.

An excerpt of Province Island reads from The History of Philadelphia's Watersheds and Sewers compiled by Adam Levine, Historical Consultant, Philadelphia Water Department:

Newesingh, or Navisink—so called by the Indians and Minquas, Boon's by the Dutch and Swedes, Province by the English before the Revolution, and State by the Americans after that time—a piece of cripple meadow and marshland surrounded by water, bounded by the Schuylkill River, Booke or Bow Creek, Minquas Creek and Church Creek. It was granted in 1669 by the Dutch governor, Peter Stuyvesant of New York to Peter Cock confirmed to him in 1681 by Governor Francis Lovelace of New York, and reconfirmed by Penn after his arrival. The western abutment of Penrose Ferry Bridge is on this island. It was the place upon which the first pest house, or hospital for the treatment of pestilential diseases, was erected by the province of Pennsylvania, from which it received the name Province Island. After the State government was formed it was called State Island, for the same reason.

"Islands in the Delaware and Schuylkill Rivers Within the Boundaries of Philadelphia From the Public Ledger Almanac for 1882". Public Ledger Almanac: 1879. Pages 3 and 5.

Kingsessing Creek ran north into the current day Eastwick, and has been since culverted and buried. A channel was built and diverted the flow into the Darby Creek at one point. The Geographic Names Information System lists this buried stretch as a separate entry as Mingo Creek.

== Present day ==
Over the century, the creek has been mostly diverted and culverted with some sections buried due to airport expansion and urban renewal. It is now wholly contained as a tidal basin along Interstate 95.

== See also ==
- List of rivers of Pennsylvania
- Tinicum Island
- Hog Island, Philadelphia
- Fort Mifflin
