= Thomas-Antoine de Mauduit du Plessis =

French officer (1753–1791)

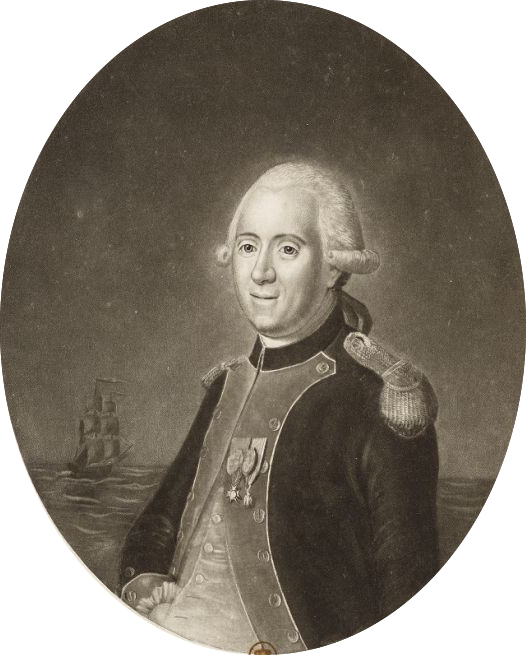
- Born: 12 September 1753; Hennebont, Brittany, France
- Died: March 1791 (aged 37); Port-au-Prince, Haiti
- Military career
- Allegiance: United States; Kingdom of France
- Branch: Continental Army; French Army
- Service years: 1777–1778 (US); 1779–1791 (France)
- Rank: Lieutenant Colonel (US); Lieutenant Colonel
- Conflicts: American Revolutionary War; Battle of Brandywine; Battle of Germantown; Battle of Red Bank; Battle of Monmouth; Haitian Revolution

Thomas-Antoine de Mauduit du Plessis or Thomas Duplessis or Thomas-Antoine du Plessis-Mauduit (12 September 1753 – March 1791) was a French officer who fought with the Continental Army during the American Revolutionary War. Born in Brittany, he ran away to sea at age 12 and voyaged in the eastern Mediterranean Sea for a time. Later, he attended a famous French artillery school. He was among a number of volunteers to join the fledgling American army in 1777, especially distinguishing himself for bravery at Germantown and skill at Red Bank. At Valley Forge he helped train American officers in the finer points of tactics and artillery handling.

He defended a key position at Monmouth in the summer of 1778. Receiving permission to resign from the American army at the end of 1778, he later fought with Jean-Baptiste Donatien de Vimeur, comte de Rochambeau's army. In 1787, he took command of a regiment in Haiti. He resisted the French Revolution, refusing to carry out instructions from the new government. Instead, he carried out a repressive counter-revolutionary program which provoked a revolt. When reinforcements arrived from France in March 1791, the new soldiers immediately took the side of the revolutionary faction. Stirred up, du Plessis' own regiment rioted and his men murdered him.

== Early career ==
Coat of arms of the Mauduit du Plessis family

Du Plessis was born in Hennebont in Brittany on 12 September 1753. Sent to the famous artillery school in Grenoble at a very young age, he ran away to Marseille when he was 12 years old. Joining a ship's crew as a seaman, he satisfied his thirst for travel by sailing to the Levant, Alexandria, and Constantinople. Eventually he returned to France and his military studies.

In December 1776, Philippe Charles Tronson de Coudray and a group of French officers left for America on the Amphitrite. The ship was soon forced to turn back to France. Anxious to get on with their journey, Lieutenant du Plessis and Philippe Hubert Preudhomme de Borre went aboard the Mercure. Du Plessis paid 400 livres for the price of his passage. Carrying a secret cargo of military supplies, the vessel left Saint-Nazaire on 5 February 1777. The Mercure reached Portsmouth, New Hampshire on 17 March and de Borre arrived at Morristown, New Jersey exactly two months later. Appointed captain of artillery in the Continental Army, du Plessis' commission dated from 15 April 1777. He fought at the Battle of Brandywine on 11 September.

== Germantown and Fort Mercer ==
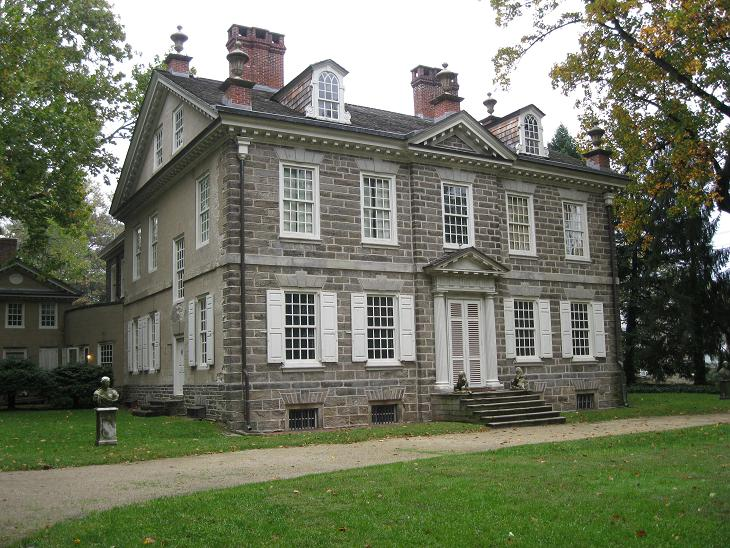
Du Plessis tried to enter one of the ground-floor windows near the servants' entrance on the left side of the Chew House, shown here.

At the Battle of Germantown on 4 October 1777, the American offensive stalled when Lieutenant Colonel Thomas Musgrave and 120 British soldiers of the 40th Foot stoutly defended the Chew House. After artillery and infantry assaults failed, du Plessis and other officers attempted to set the house on fire. To fellow aide John Laurens, du Plessis suggested the idea of fetching hay from the nearby barn and using it to ignite the structure. Using the kitchen outbuilding as cover, du Plessis reached a ground-floor window to the left of the servant's entrance. He smashed it and tried to climb in. Perched on the window sill, he found himself face to face with a pistol-wielding British officer who demanded his surrender. At that moment, a British soldier burst into the room and fired at du Plessis but hit the officer by mistake. After this close call, the Frenchman decided to retreat. With numerous American soldiers looking on, he refused to run for it. He later claimed that he retired at a walk, which he managed to do without being shot, though Laurens was slightly wounded in the shoulder. Two of Major General John Sullivan's aides, Captains John White and Edward Sherburne were killed while unsuccessfully trying to carry out this dangerous mission.

Later that month, George Washington sent du Plessis to Fort Mercer to take command of the garrison's artillery and also to oversee its defenses. When he reported to Colonel Christopher Greene on 11 October, he found a sprawling fortress that was 350 yards (320 m) long and 100 yards (91 m) wide. The works were far too extensive for the 250 defenders and 14 cannons. Du Plessis immediately constructed a new wall that bisected the old works, effectively abandoning a large part of the fort in order to concentrate the defenses in a smaller area. Since fruit trees made excellent abatis, James Whitall's nearby orchard was entirely cut down for the purpose. For his part, Greene ordered every available man to help the French engineer improve the fort's defenses.

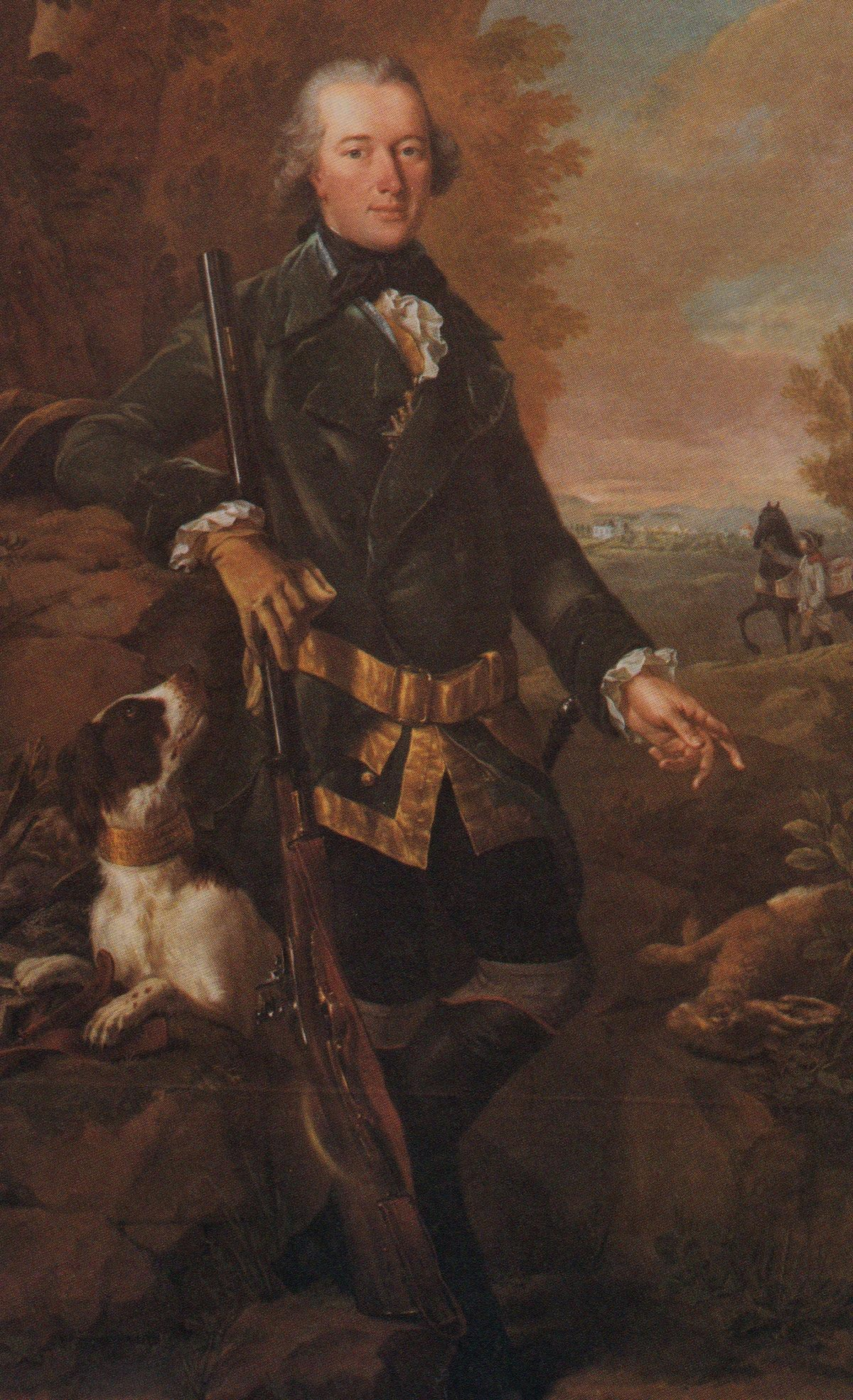
Carl von Donop was fatally wounded while leading his troops against du Plessis' improvised works.

Sir William Howe ordered an expedition under Colonel Carl von Donop to capture Fort Mercer. Donop took 2,000 infantry, including Ludwig von Wurmb's Hessian and Ansbach Jäger Corps, the Mirbach Hessian Infantry Regiment, and the Lengerke, Linsing, and Minningerode Hessian grenadier battalions. These were accompanied by 10 Hessian 3-pound battalion cannons and Captain-lieutenant Francis Downman's two 5.5-inch howitzers of the British Royal Artillery. Donop's soldiers crossed the Delaware River into New Jersey on the morning of 21 October 1777 and camped at Haddonfield that night. Around noon on 22 October, the expedition approached the fort and initiated the Battle of Red Bank.

That morning, Colonel Israel Angell's 2nd Rhode Island Regiment was ferried across the Delaware from Fort Mifflin to assist Greene's 1st Rhode Island Regiment. Altogether, Greene commanded about 500 defenders. Soon afterward, a Hessian drummer beat a parley and Major Charles Stuart, accompanied by a Hessian officer, came forward to demand the fort's surrender. Greene sent Lieutenant Colonel Jeremiah Olney to meet the British major. Though Stuart threatened in a loud voice that no quarter would be given to the defenders, Olney refused. Du Plessis later related to François-Jean de Chastellux that Stuart's overbearing tone inspired the defenders to greater resistance.

Donop waited for two hours and sent a second surrender demand to the fort. When it was refused again, he prepared to attack. Donop ordered the Minningerode Grenadiers to attack the right or east side of the fort, the Mirbach Musketeers to assault the center, and the Linsing Grenadiers to charge the left or west side. He held the Lengerke Grenadiers in reserve. Jäger sharpshooters found positions where they could pick off the defenders. At 4:30 PM, the Hessian infantry advanced after a brief artillery bombardment. Donop led the Minningerode column which rushed into the abandoned eastern section of the fort. Though they were sprayed by grapeshot from American gunboats, the grenadiers forced their way into the abatis. At that moment, the defenders opened fire from point-blank range and simply mowed down the Germans. Despite the efforts of the officers to urge the men on, all three attacking columns were stopped with horrific losses and forced to retreat.

The Hessians lost eight officers, seven non-coms, and 75 privates killed. There were 15 officers, 24 non-coms, and 188 privates wounded. One non-com and 68 privates were missing, making a total of 382 casualties. The Americans lost 14 killed, 21 wounded, and one captured. De Plessis sortied from the fort with a few men in the evening and captured 20 Hessians. That night, amid the horrible groans of the wounded Hessians, du Plessis heard a voice in English pleading for help. He went with a few men, found Donop with a shattered left thigh bone, and brought him into the works. Though some Americans taunted the wounded Hessian with his "no quarter" message, du Plessis managed to calm the men down and get medical treatment for his adversary. Donop died of his wound a week later. Though Stuart was in the forefront of the attack, he survived unscathed.

== Valley Forge and Monmouth ==
After the British successfully ended the Siege of Fort Mifflin on 16 November 1777, only Fort Mercer barred the Delaware River to their shipping. Lord Charles Cornwallis crossed into New Jersey with 2,000 men to eliminate the fort. Greene evacuated his garrison on the night of 20 and 21 November. Du Plessis saved some artillery and supplies, and was responsible for detonating the fort's magazine before the British arrived. On 25 November 1777, an American force harassed Cornwallis' column as it withdrew from New Jersey. Gilbert Motier, marquis de La Fayette led about 300 Americans against the British rear guard in the Battle of Gloucester. The Hessian Jägers lost five killed, 14 wounded, and 10 missing. Du Plessis was involved in the skirmish and his horse was wounded. After receiving a letter from Washington praising du Plessis' good work at Brandywine, Germantown, and Fort Mercer, the Continental Congress voted to promote the Frenchman to lieutenant colonel. The vote was taken on 19 January 1778, but the commission was retroactively dated 26 November 1777.

The view looks north from Combs Hill toward the British left flank. Du Plessis' four cannons fired from the hill.

Historian Robert K. Wright Jr. asserted that du Plessis was "instrumental" in familiarizing American officers with the writings of Jacques Antoine Hippolyte, Comte de Guibert at Valley Forge during the 1777–1778 winter. After France's defeat in the Seven Years' War, Guibert wrote Essai Generale de Tactique which was refined and published in 1772. This work stressed that foot soldiers be trained to fight as both line and light infantry, and to use both columns and linear formations on the battlefield. Guibert was also influenced by artillery theorist Jean-Baptiste Vaquette de Gribeauval who urged gunners to group their guns into massed batteries and to mainly direct their fire on the enemy infantry. Although Friedrich Wilhelm von Steuben played a more significant role in introducing professionalism among American officers, du Plessis was nevertheless highly respected as an instructor.

At the Battle of Monmouth on 28 June 1778, Charles Lee led the 5,000-man American advance guard to attack Sir Henry Clinton's British army. Since Lee was a recently exchanged prisoner of war, he did not realize that the Continental Army had become a more professional force in his absence. Consequently, he mishandled his troops on the field. Washington arrived with the army's main body to find Lee's advance guard in full retreat in the face of Clinton's counterattack. He quickly set up a holding position and rode back to organize the main line of defense.

At about the same time, Washington sent William Woodford's 3rd Virginia Brigade and four cannons under du Plessis to block any British attempt to turn his right flank. Soon afterward, the American commander encountered Lieutenant Colonel David Rhea who told him about high ground on the south flank. Washington ordered Rhea to find Nathanael Greene and lead him to the position. Around 3:00 PM Greene reached on Combs Hill to find it protected on three sides by a swampy stream and overlooking the British left flank. Du Plessis, adjutant to American artillery chief Henry Knox, arrived with four 6-pound cannons around 3:30 PM. Unlimbering their guns, his crews opened an enfilading fire against the British line at the hedgerow and their nearby artillery line. This probably caused Clinton to order a withdrawal soon after. Later, Anthony Wayne sallied forth to attack the British and Clinton sent the 1st Grenadiers and the 33rd Foot to push him back. As Wayne fell back, the British again came within range of du Plessis' guns around 5:30 PM. According to legend, one well-aimed cannonball passed along the front of a grenadier platoon, knocking the muskets out of every man's hands. The British attack faltered and their troops finally retired.

== Haiti ==
On 5 November 1778, Congress granted du Plessis leave to resign from the Continental Army and ordered that a letter be prepared testifying to his "zeal, bravery and good conduct". Historian Francis B. Heitman related no more about his service with the American army and did not list him in his separate roll of French officers. However, another source stated that du Plessis fought under Jean-Baptiste Donatien de Vimeur, comte de Rochambeau. He was promoted to major in the French royal army and was posted to Haiti in 1787 as commandant of the Port-au-Prince Regiment.

At the outbreak of the French Revolution, he announced himself to be hostile to it and was outspoken in his views against freeing the slaves. He and Governor Philibert François Rouxel de Blanchelande refused to carry out the decrees ordered by the revolutionary government. Instead, du Plessis disarmed the national guard and formed a royalist corps called the Pompons Blancs. He arrested the colonial revolutionary committee and dissolved the local assembly. His harsh policies provoked a general insurrection. On 3 March 1791, the Artois and Normandie Regiments arrived from France as reinforcements for the colony. The new soldiers quickly made common cause with local revolutionary elements and told the men of the Port-au-Prince Regiment that their commander had been executing false orders. Aroused by this news, his troops mutinied and killed du Plessis.
