= HMS Augusta (1763) =

Ship of the line of the Royal Navy

- Ship plan of Augusta

History

Great Britain
- Name: HMS Augusta
- Ordered: 13 January 1761
- Builder: Wells and Stanton, Rotherhithe
- Laid down: 28 February 1761
- Launched: 13 July 1763
- Fate: Burned, 22 October 1777

General characteristics
- Class & type: St Albans-class ship of the line
- Tons burthen: 138133/94 (bm)
- Length: 159 ft (48 m) (gundeck), 130 ft 6.375 in (39.78593 m) (keel)
- Beam: 44 ft 7.25 in (13.5954 m)
- Depth of hold: 18 ft 10 in (5.74 m)
- Propulsion: Sails
- Sail plan: Full-rigged ship
- Armament: 64 guns: Gundeck: 26 × 24-pounders; Upper gundeck: 26 × 18-pounders; Quarterdeck: 10 × 4-pounders; Forecastle: 2 × 9-pounders

HMS Augusta was a 64-gun third rate ship of the line of the Royal Navy, launched on 13 July 1763 by shipbuilding contractors Thomas Stanton and William Wells at Rotherhithe, London, and completed on 12 August 1763 at Deptford Dockyard

First commissioned in May 1763 under Captain Matthew Whitwell, the Augusta was initially fitted at Chatham Dockward as a guard ship, and served in that role at Sheerness in 1764, at Chatham 1765–68, and back to Sheerness in 1769. She was fitted at Chatham for Channel service in October 1770, but paid off into Ordinary (Reserve status) in May 1771. She sailed for North America on 28 March 1777 under the command of Captain Francis Reynolds. After running aground in the Delaware River Augusta was accidentally destroyed by fire on 23 October 1777 during the Battle of Red Bank.

== Loss ==
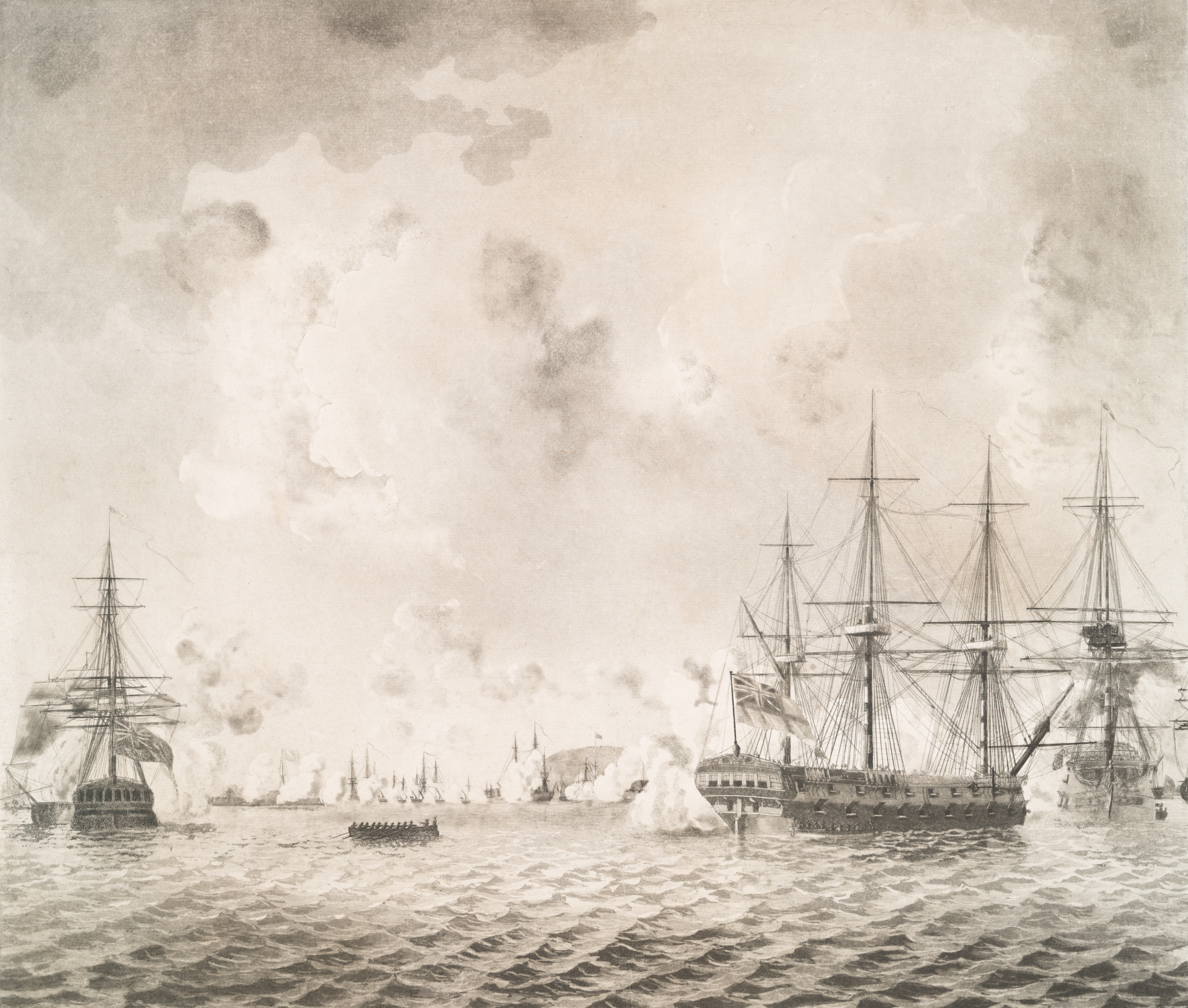
Augusta (first from right) at the action off Mud Fort, 15 November 1777

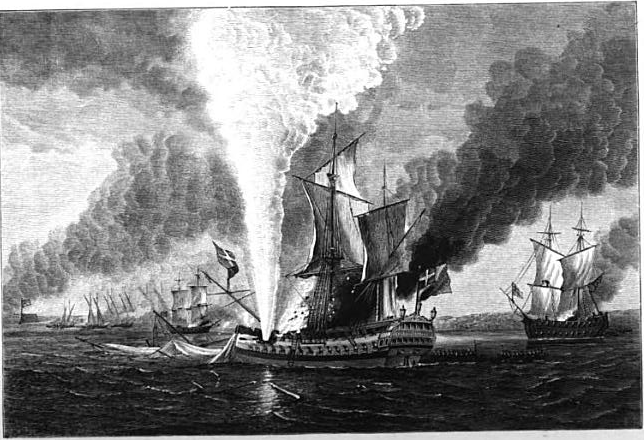
Augusta blowing up after the attack on Fort Mercer, 23 October 1777

On the evening of 22 October 1777, the Augusta, still under the command of Captain Reynolds, had sailed up the Delaware River with several other warships to a point a short distance below some chevaux de frise obstructions in order to fire at Fort Mercer the following day. As the tide fell, both Augusta and the sloop HMS Merlin (16) went aground on one of the several sandbars around that location. Despite attempts during the night by HMS Roebuck (44) to free Augusta from its predicament, the warship remained hard aground.

About 9:00AM on 23 October, a general action started with HMS Pearl (32) and HMS Liverpool (28) joining other vessels in the bombardment. The British ships were engaged by Fort Mifflin and the Pennsylvania Navy, under the command of Commodore John Hazelwood, launched four fire ships. At about 2:00 PM, the Augusta caught fire near its stern, according to an American eyewitness. The fire spread rapidly and soon the entire vessel was wrapped in flames. After about an hour the fire reached the magazine and the ship exploded. The blast smashed windows in Philadelphia and was heard 30 miles (48 km) away in Trappe, Pennsylvania. The loss of the Augusta was attributed to various causes. Vice Admiral Lord Richard Howe reported wadding from the guns caught fire. Other versions say that the crew intentionally set the blaze. Some Americans asserted that Augusta was ignited by a fire ship while others stated that its loss was caused by red-hot shot from Fort Mifflin. Lieutenant Robert Baldock, the ship's Chaplain and Gunner were killed.[1] John Montresor, the British officer in charge of the Siege of Fort Mifflin, reported 60 of Augusta's ratings were killed while struggling in the water. Soon after, the crew of Merlin abandoned ship and set their ship on fire. It blew up later in the day.

== Legacy ==
Augusta was the largest vessel and only ship of the line lost in combat by the Royal Navy while fighting against U.S. forces in either the American War of Independence or the War of 1812. In the 1870s, rumours of gold in the wreck, which was still partially visible in the river, led to recovery efforts that removed tableware, a watch, coins, and three cannon. An attempt to move the ship for display in the 1876 Centennial Exposition in Philadelphia failed, leaving the ship grounded again at Gloucester City, New Jersey. There, it was made a tourist attraction with paid admission for a few years before it broke up in a heavy storm.

The Daughters of the American Revolution took much of the wood to its Washington, D.C. headquarters and used it to recreate an English period dining room. Other pieces washed up on Gloucester City beaches and were collected by citizens. One Paulsboro resident collected 14 staircase pedestals, donating 12 to the Smithsonian Institution and one to the Gill Memorial Library in Paulsboro.
