= Battle of Gloucester (1777) =

1777 battle

Coordinates: 39.87206°N 75.18871°W

- Part of the American Revolutionary War
Date	November 25, 1777
Location	Gloucester City, New Jersey
Result	American victory

Belligerents
United States	Great Britain: Hesse-Kassel

Commanders and leaders
Marquis de Lafayette; Armand de La Rouërie Colonel Richard Butler	(Kingdom of Great Britain) Lord Cornwallis

Strength
350 regulars and militia	400 jägers

Casualties and losses
1 killed 5 wounded	20 killed 20 wounded 20 captured

The Battle of Gloucester was a skirmish fought between November 25, 1777 and the early morning of November 26, 1777, during the Philadelphia campaign of the American Revolutionary War. It was the first battlefield command for the Marquis de Lafayette.

== Background ==
In mid-1777, British General William Howe embarked on a plan to regain control of Britain's rebellious Thirteen Colonies by capturing Philadelphia, the city where the Continental Congress met. He successfully captured the city in September 1777, and then, after consolidating his command of the city by repulsing an attack from General George Washington's Continental Army at Germantown in October, sought to gain control of the Delaware River as far north as the city, on which his army depended for supplies.

After a Hessian assault on Fort Mercer, one of the principal defenses on the New Jersey side of the river, was repulsed in the Battle of Red Bank, Howe sent part of his army across the Delaware to Gloucester, New Jersey under the command of Lord Cornwallis to take Fort Mercer. Washington reacted to this by detaching forces under General Nathanael Greene across the Delaware just north of Gloucester.

Greene was accompanied by the Marquis de Lafayette, a young French officer who had accompanied Washington at the Battle of Brandywine. Lafayette had been wounded in the foot in that battle, and, while it was not fully healed, he was eager to join the action. Greene ordered Lafayette out on a reconnaissance mission to determine the location and strength of Cornwallis' army.

== Battle ==
Lafayette led 350 men toward the British position. He carefully scouted the British camp, at times personally coming within firing range of British sentries. He then led his men in a surprise attack on a forward picket of jägers. The 400 Hessians were caught completely unprepared, and began a disorganized fighting retreat toward the main British camp, with Lafayette and his men giving chase. Cornwallis sent some grenadiers to provide covering fire as the Germans retreated, and Lafayette withdrew under cover of darkness, returning to Greene.

== Aftermath ==
Lafayette's reconnaissance was a success. He suffered only one killed and five wounded, against 60 casualties on the British side. Word of the operation was instrumental in a decision by Congress to award him a commission as a major general in the Continental Army.
