= Little Darby Creek =

Little Darby Creek may refer to:

- Little Darby Creek (Ohio)
- Little Darby Creek (Pennsylvania)

== See also ==
- Darby Creek (disambiguation)
