= HMS Merlin (1757) =

Sloop of the Royal Navy

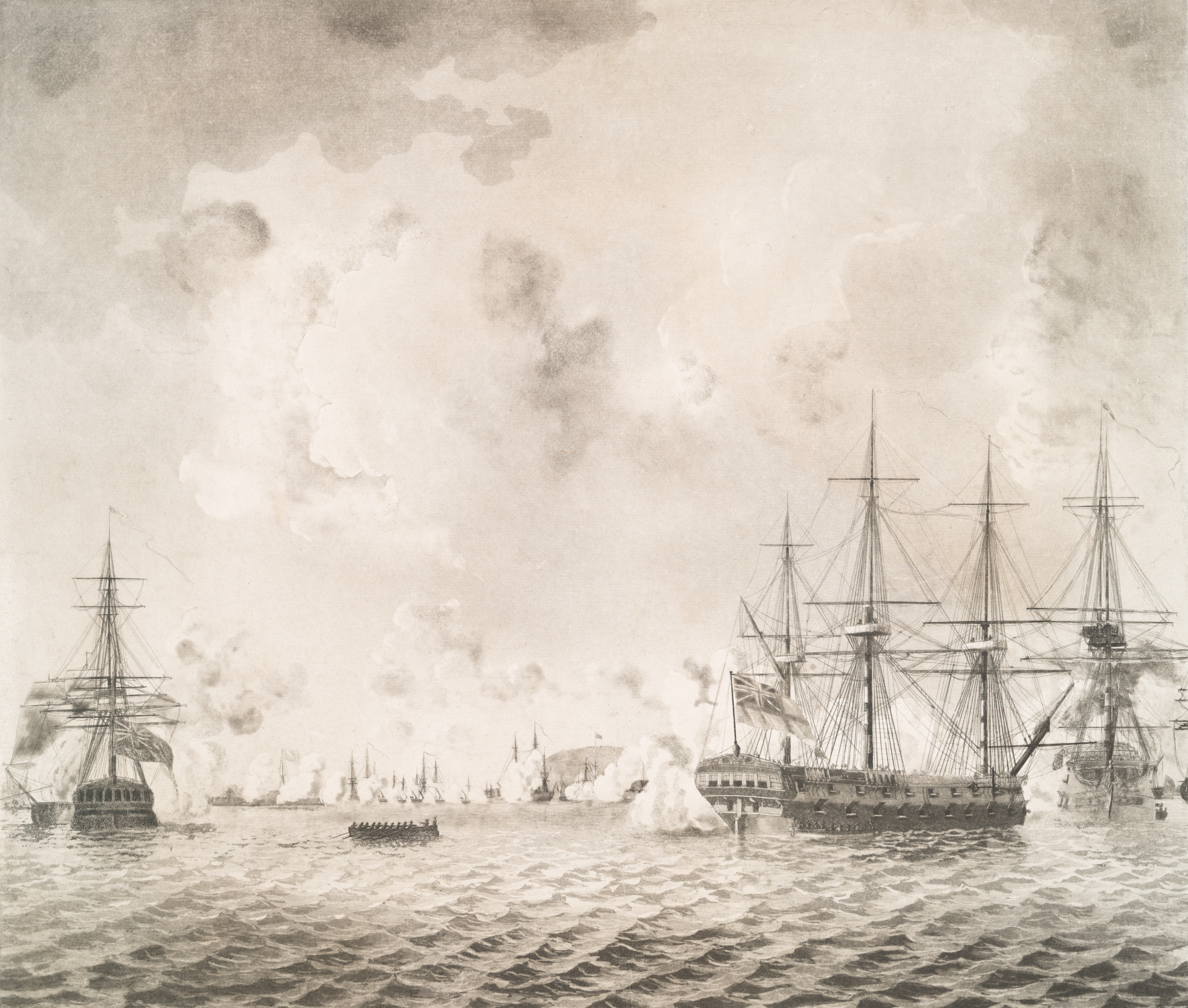
Merlin (first from left) at the action off Mud Fort on 15 November 1777

HMS Merlin was a 16-gun sloop-of-war of the Royal Navy. Commanded by Samuel Reeve, she saw service during the American Revolutionary War.

== Background ==
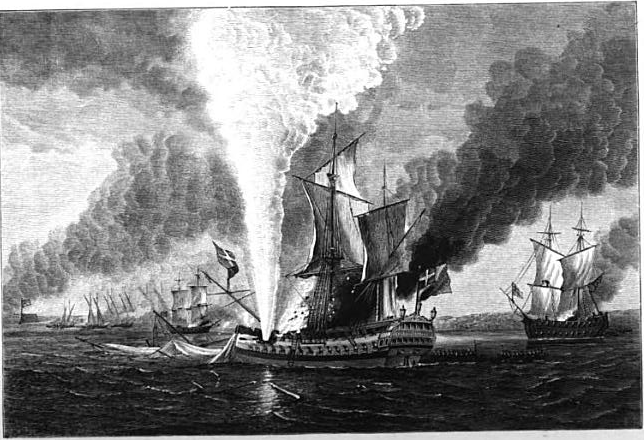
Augusta and Merlin, after the attack on Fort Mercer, 23 October 1777

As part of the advance fleet of Francis Reynolds, these warships were to force the upper passage of the Delaware River, attack and silence Fort Mercer, and Fort Mifflin, during the Battle of Red Bank, which was intended to open navigation to Philadelphia, allowing the supplying of British troops occupying that city. Merlin along with HMS Augusta ran aground trying to avoid river obstacles, the Cheval de Frise sunk in the river and the changed river channels as a conciquence while the river tide receded. It was not possible to get free the following tide due to a fresh north wind. Rebel forces seeing the ships caught fired on HMS Augusta from their Gallies works and floating batteries and she caught fire. Whilst other ships present could fall down stream the Merlin could not be protected from Augusta's blast when her magazine exploded, 23 October 1777. On orders of Admiral Richard Lord Howe, Captain Reynolds evacuated and destroyed the ship to prevent its capture by American forces.

== Sources ==
- McGeorge, Wallace (1905). The battle of Red Bank, resulting in the defeat of the Hessians and the destruction of the British frigate Augusta, Oct. 22 and 23, 1777. Camden, New Jersey, Sinnickson Chew, printers.
- McGuire, Thomas J. (2007). The Philadelphia Campaign: Germantown and the Roads to Valley Forge. Stackpole Books. ISBN 978-0-8117-4945-9.
