= HMS Vigilant (1777) =

British merchantman ship

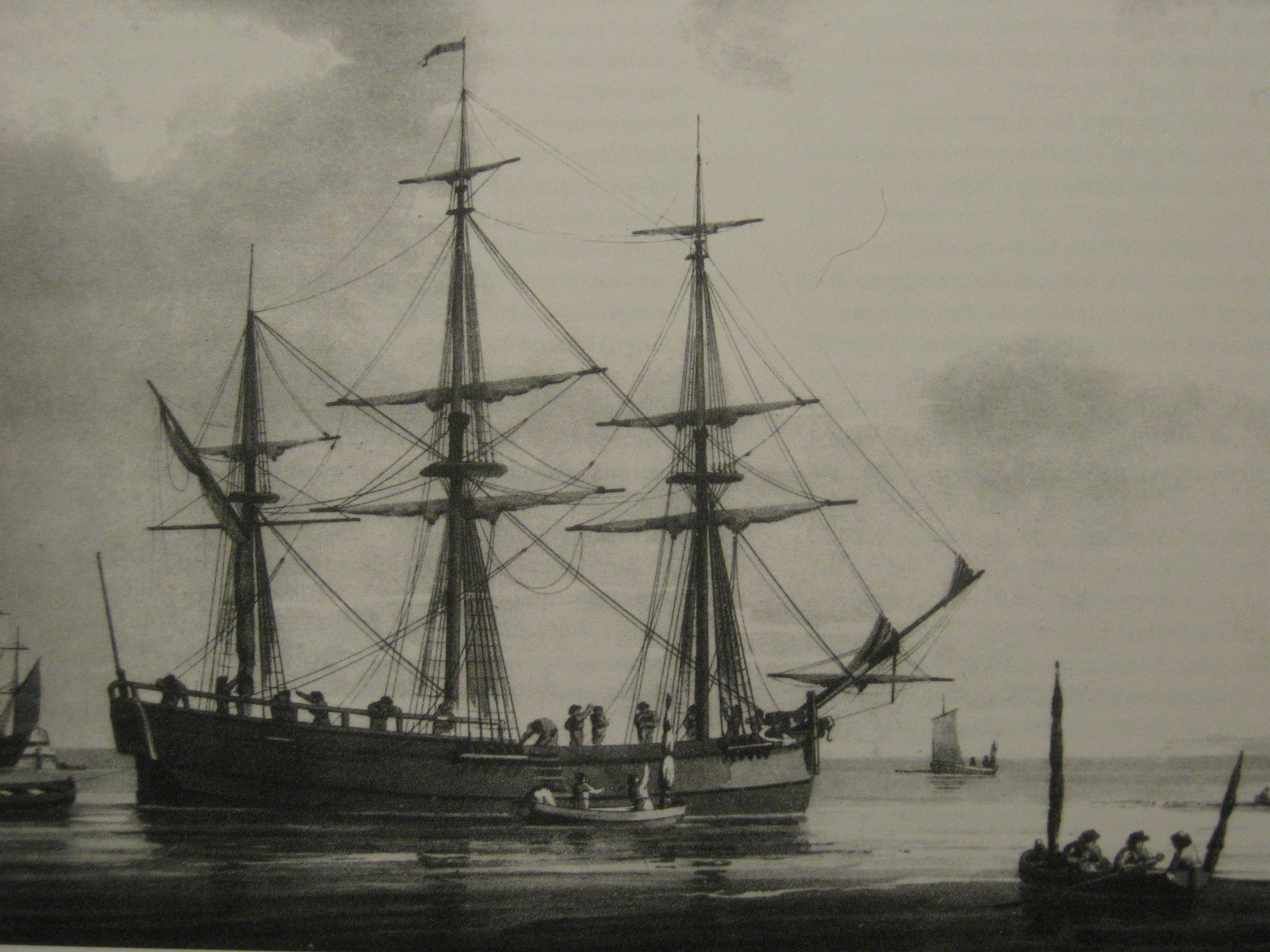
- HMS Vigilant (1777) image

History

Great Britain
- Name: Grand Duchess of Russia
- Builder: Whitby
- Launched: 1774
- Renamed: HMS Vigilant
- Fate: Purchased by the Royal Navy before 23 April 1777

Great Britain
- Name: HMS Vigilant
- Acquired: Before 23 April 1777
- Decommissioned: 9 April 1780
- Fate: Burnt as unfit, 1780

General characteristics
- Tons burthen: 68414/94 bm
- Length: 122 ft 6 in (37.3 m) (at the gundeck)
- Beam: 34 ft 10 in (10.6 m)
- Sail plan: Barque-rigged
- Complement: about 180
- Armament: 14 × 24–pounder guns; 2 × 9–pounder guns; 4 × 6–pounder guns

HMS Vigilant was the merchantman Grand Duchess of Russia, converted into a warship during the American Revolution. She served as a transport in North American waters from 1775. The Royal Navy (RN) purchased her in 1777, named her HMS Vigilant, and modified her for shore bombardment duties. She was instrumental in the eventual British success during the siege of Fort Mifflin that same year and supported British operations in Georgia and South Carolina in 1779–80. Her heavy armament proved to be more than Vigilant was designed to handle and she was condemned and burnt in 1780.

== Description and service ==
Grand Duchess of Russia was built at Whitby in 1774; the Navy Board chartered her at the beginning of 1775 to serve as a transport. While being modified at Deptford Dockyard in February, the ship was surveyed and found to be barque-rigged and just over 308 tons burthen in size. A survey in New York two years later gave her length as 120 ft (36.6 m), measured at the keel, with a beam of 36 ft (11.0 m). (Note: Syrett comments that the RN used a special system to determine tonnage for chartered transports, but refers the reader to his book, "Shipping and the Atlantic War, 1775–1783" for details.) Naval historian Rif Winfield quotes her burthen as 68414/94 tons with a length at the gundeck of 122 feet 6 inches (37.3 m) and beam of 34 ft 10 in (10.6 m).

Grand Duchess of Russia departed for Boston, Massachusetts carrying 150 marines on 30 March 1775 and she remained in North American waters for the next two years. Vice Admiral Lord Howe, commander of the North American Station, informed the Admiralty on 23 April that he had purchased the Grand Duchess of Russia and commissioned her as HMS Vigilant to bombard targets ashore. (Note: Winfield says that she was "taken up' on 23 April and not purchased until 6 September 1777. She was commissioned as a sixth rate in November 1777.) The ship received fourteen 24-pounder guns from the 50-gun ship Centurion, and two 9-pounder and four 6-pounder guns from the hospital (prison) ship Jersey. Additional gun ports were cut in Vigilant's side to allow two guns to be switched from one side to give her a broadside of nine guns. The 150 men of her crew came from the crews of Howe's flagship, the third rate Eagle, Centurion, and the fourth rate Preston, while her 30 marines were drawn from the marine brigade at Halifax.

Her conversion was completed by the end of June and her first task was to cover the evacuation of British troops from Perth Amboy, New Jersey on 29 July. The following month, Vigilant served as Howe's flagship when he landed British troops at Elkton, Maryland, at the northern end of Chesapeake Bay, during the Philadelphia Campaign. In October, the ship sailed for the mouth of the Delaware River to attack the American fortifications defending Philadelphia. During this voyage, she rolled so badly during heavy weather that the round shot fell out of her guns and it was later decided that she should not put to sea with her guns mounted except during the summer months. Vigilant was not designed to carry such heavy weights as the 2,200-pound (1,000 kg) 24-pounder guns up high in the ship and cutting gun ports in her sides further weakened her structure.

The first attack on Fort Mifflin on 22–23 October had been a disaster with two British ships run aground and burnt. For the second attack three weeks later, Vigilant's crew was reinforced with an extra 50 men to work the guns and 24 riflemen to suppress the defenders of the fort during the attack. The ship's sides were reinforced and two guns were transferred to the starboard side of the ship. Her trim was maintained by placing casks of water on the port side. While other ships bombarded the fort from the main channel, Vigilant and a smaller ship worked their way up a secondary channel to the rear of the fort. They were able to silence the fort's guns by 6 p.m., and the Americans evacuated five hours later, despite the ship's grapeshot and small arms fire. During the attack Vigilant only lost three men killed and five wounded; her hull had only been hit several times, but her rigging was shot to pieces. In recognition of the ship's success, her commander, Lieutenant John Henry, was promoted to the command of the frigate Fowey.

Vigilant was generally inactive while the British occupied Philadelphia, but she sailed to New York City when the British evacuated the city in June 1778. She joined the small British squadron there upon the approach of a French squadron under the command of the Comte d'Estaing in July, but the French declined to engage the British ships. The ship accompanied the British squadron to Newport, Rhode Island as it attempted to lift the Franco-American siege, but Vigilant was badly damaged when a storm interrupted the planned battle on 13 August. Despite the damage, she supported British troops on 29–30 August as they pursued the retreating Americans who had abandoned the siege after the French ships sailed to Boston for repairs. A few days later, on 4 September, the ship collided with the sloop-of-war Raven during the British raid on New London, Connecticut and had her bow stove in by the other ship. Vigilant was quickly repaired in New York and participated in the attack on Little Egg Harbor River in October.

At the beginning of December, the ship sailed from New York to Savannah, Georgia to assist in the attack on that city. Despite dismounting her main armament, the ship had to keep one or more pumps running continuously during the voyage to prevent her from sinking. She arrived at Savannah on 28 December, after the British had secured the city. Her 9-pounder guns were ordered removed when she was reclassified as a 20-gun armed transport on 22 December. Throughout 1779, Vigilant supported British operations along the coasts of Georgia and South Carolina, despite running aground several times. Lacking substantial repairs during this time, the ship's condition deteriorated until her crew refused to take her to sea from Beaufort, South Carolina on 28 February 1780 to support the planned siege of Charleston. She was then surveyed and condemned as "utterly unfit for sea" and decommissioned on 9 April. (Note: Winfield give a decommissioning date of 17 August after which she was burnt.) Her crew and armament were loaded aboard the transport Margaret & Martha and taken to Charleston where they were transferred to the transport Margery, (Note: Colledge gives this ship's name as Majority.) which had been purchased and renamed Sandwich to serve as Vigilant's replacement. Vigilant was burnt at Beaufort sometime later that year.
