= Carpenter's Island (Pennsylvania) =

Island in Pennsylvania, United States

Coordinates: 39°51′47″N 75°13′50″W

Carpenter's Island, Pennsylvania is a historical location on the Delaware River in Delaware County, Pennsylvania, reportedly named for the Carpenter family who purchased land on the island in the late 17th century, originally located near the mouth of the Schuylkill River, just north of Hog Island, Philadelphia, Pennsylvania

Over time, Hog Island migrated north into Carpenter's Island; the area is now the Philadelphia International Airport. Carpenter's Island appears on a 1753 map of Philadelphia and adjacent areas drawn by Nicolas Scull and George Heap, is mentioned in American Revolutionary War histories about action on the Delaware River in late 1777, and is shown on a 1785 map drawn by William Faden. Alternate names are Carpenters Island, Cock's Island, Cocks Island, Fisher's Island, Fishers Island, and Peter Cock's Island.
