= Fort Billingsport =

Coordinates: 39°50′52″N 75°15′05″W

- Billingsport, New Jersey
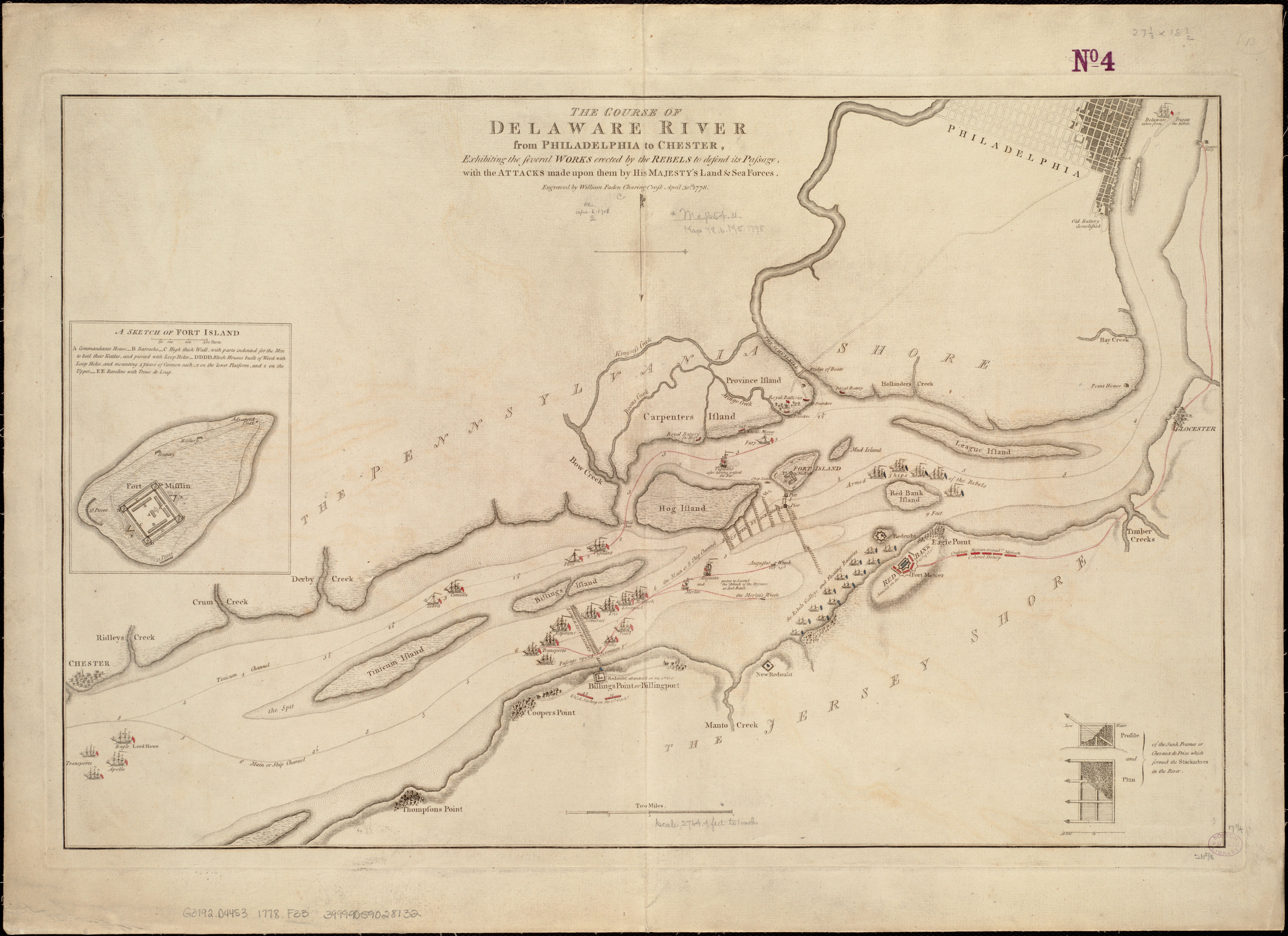
- British map showing Billings Point or Billingport

Site information
- Type: Earthwork

Location
- Location within Gloucester County, New Jersey Location within New Jersey Location within the United States

Site history
- Built: 1776–1777
- Built by: Tadeusz Kościuszko (design); Robert Smith
- Battles/wars: American Revolutionary War

Garrison information
- Past commanders: William Bradford

Fort Billingsport, referred to as Fort Billings in some sources, was a Continental Army fort in Billingsport in Paulsboro, New Jersey in Gloucester County, New Jersey, during the American Revolutionary War. The site of the fort is now a public park of the same name, located at the Plains Terminal at the Port of Paulsboro between two oil refineries.

== History ==
The land for the extensive fortification was authorized for purchase by the Second Continental Congress on July 5, 1776, for use by the Pennsylvania Committee of Safety. It represents the first land purchase made by the United States. The 96 acres (0.4 km^{2}) site was purchased for 600 pounds. The fort was built to protect a line of chevaux de frise obstacles that were placed in the river in 1775. Tadeusz Kościuszko designed the fortifications at the request of George Washington. Construction began under the supervision of Robert Smith, designer of the river obstacles, who died in February 1777 while working on the fort. The fort was built by troops from New Jersey, Pennsylvania, South Carolina and Virginia, along with laborers and skilled workmen. The original plan envisaged a fort of 700 feet (210 m) diagonal measure, with a 7.5 feet (2.3 m) parapet. However, available materials, workmen, and garrison troops caused the fort to be built to a much smaller and less defensible plan. It was built with a redoubt on the northwest corner and five cannon. The fort was a square earthwork of 15 acres (6.1 ha) with four corner bastions. It had a barracks, officers' quarters, and a bakehouse. The fort was never completed.

=== Philadelphia campaign ===
Following their victory at the Battle of Brandywine and a few subsequent minor engagements, the British occupied Philadelphia unopposed on September 26, 1777. Three lines of chevaux de frise and three forts (Fort Billingsport, Fort Mercer, and Fort Mifflin) still blocked their naval line of communications via the Delaware River. One line of chevaux was at Marcus Hook, the second line was at Fort Billingsport, and the third line was between Fort Mifflin and Fort Mercer. Fort Billingsport fell to the British on October 2, 1777. William Bradford, the fort's commander, with only 112 men on hand after desertions, spiked the guns, burned the barracks, and evacuated the fort as the British approached.

The British dismantled the fort and cut paths through the first two lines of chevaux de frise, eventually proceeding upriver towards Fort Mercer and Fort Mifflin (which guarded the last line of obstacles) and unsuccessfully attacked the former in the Battle of Red Bank on October 22, 1777. Fort Mifflin withstood a siege and bombardment until it was evacuated on November 15, 1777; Fort Mercer was abandoned three days later.

The British later built a two-gun redoubt on the site of Fort Billingsport, which was abandoned as they evacuated Philadelphia on June 18, 1778. The Patriots re-occupied the site, rebuilt the fort and manned it until 1781, when the fighting moved to the Yorktown campaign in Yorktown, Virginia.

During the War of 1812, Fort Billingsport was used for an encampment of a militia brigade of 1,300 men. In 1814, Fort Billingsport was rehabilitated and converted to a military training center. By April 1825, the fort was described as "desolate", with no structures remaining. In December 1834, the War Department sold the 96-acre tract to Joseph C. Gill and his partner John Ford for $2,000.

== See also ==
- Fort Mercer
- Fort Mifflin
- Seacoast defense in the United States
- List of coastal fortifications of the United States
