= Darby Creek =

Darby Creek may refer to:

- Darby Creek (Pennsylvania), a tributary of the Delaware River
- Two streams in central Ohio:
  - Big Darby Creek
  - Little Darby Creek (Ohio)
- Darby Creek Publishing, an imprint of Lerner Publishing Group

== See also ==
- Little Darby Creek (disambiguation)
