= Fort Mercer =

Earthen fort on the Delaware River in New Jersey

Coordinates: 39°52′09″N 75°11′15″W

- National Park, New Jersey
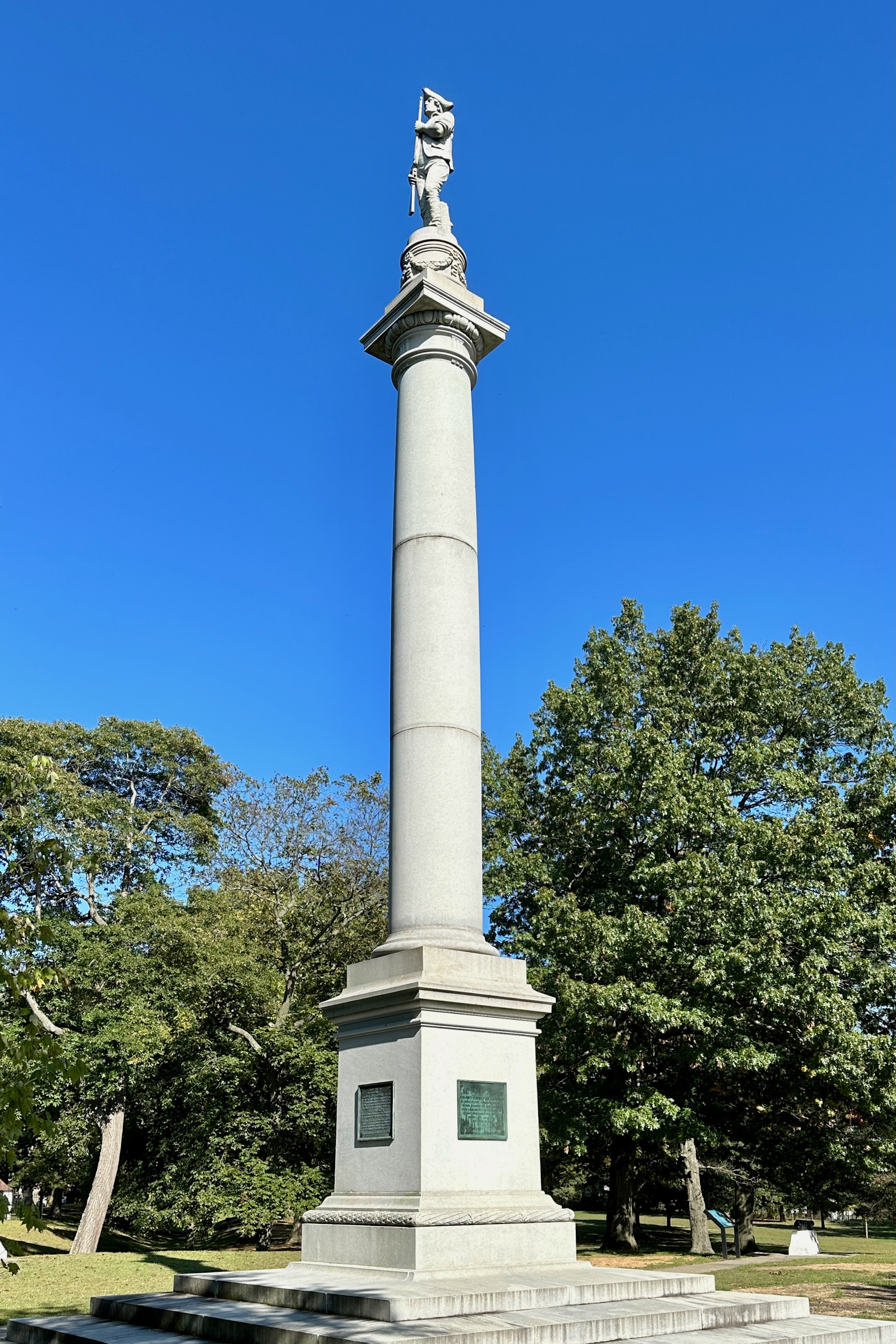
- Monument in Fort Mercer, dedicated 1906

Site information
- Type: Earthwork

Location
- Location within Gloucester County, New Jersey Location within New Jersey Location within the United States

Site history
- Built: 1777
- Built by: Tadeusz Kościuszko (design); Thomas Duplessis
- In use: 1777–1781
- Materials: earth, logs
- Red Bank Battlefield
- U.S. National Register of Historic Places
- U.S. National Historic Landmark
- New Jersey Register of Historic Places
- Location: 100 Hessian Ave., National Park, NJ 08063
- NRHP reference No.: 72000796
- NJRHP No.: 1405

Significant dates
- Added to NRHP: October 31, 1972
- Designated NHL: November 28, 1972
- Designated NJRHP: August 16, 1979
- Battles/wars: American Revolutionary War

Garrison information
- Past commanders: Christopher Greene

Fort Mercer was an earthen fort on the eastern shores of the Delaware River in New Jersey that was constructed by the Continental Army during the American Revolutionary War. The fort was built in 1777 by Polish engineer Thaddeus Kosciuszko under the command of George Washington. Along with Fort Mifflin on the Pennsylvania side of the Delaware River to its west, Fort Mercer was designed to block the British advance on the revolutionary capital of Philadelphia during the Philadelphia campaign.

Fort Mercer was located in an area called Red Bank in what is now the borough of National Park in Gloucester County, New Jersey. The fort was named in honor of Brigadier General Hugh Mercer who died earlier that year in fighting at the Battle of Princeton.

The fort's site is now part of Red Bank Battlefield Historical Park, which includes a monument and museum. Several cannons attributed to British warships lost supporting the attack on the fort, and others found buried at the fort itself, are in the park.

== Background ==
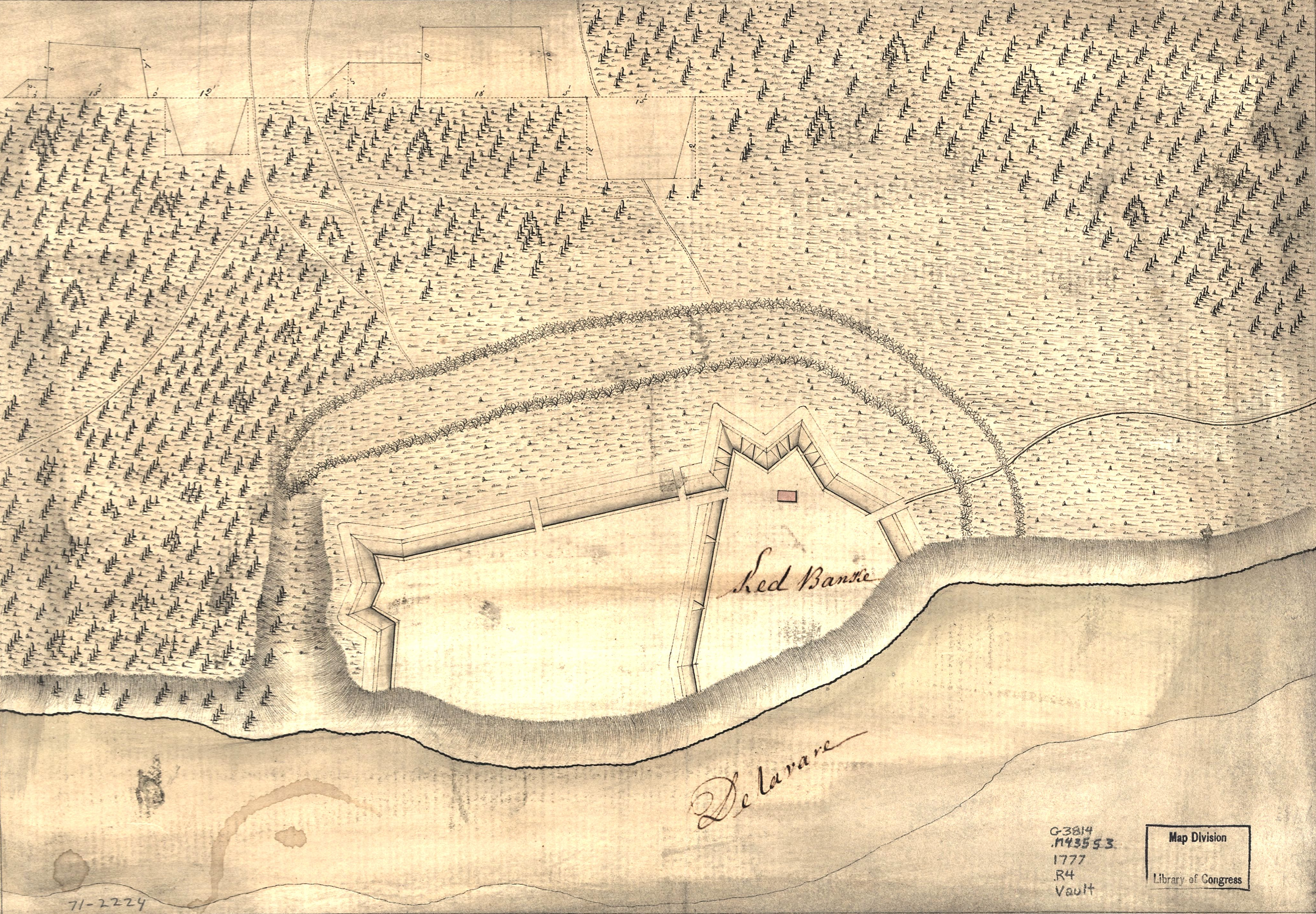
Map with detail of Fort Mercer (Red Banke)

Fort Mercer Flag

Fort Mercer was built and Fort Mifflin were rebuilt and garrisoned to protect a line of chevaux de frise obstacles across the Delaware River. Fort Billingsport was built downriver to protect another line of these obstacles. Fort Mercer had earthen walls with a surrounding ditch, topped with a log palisade. The fort was about 320 yards (290 m) long and 50 yards (46 m) wide and mounted 14 cannons, with bastions on the landward corners. A separate outer redoubt was located north of the fort, but this was not garrisoned.

The fort could accommodate a garrison of 1,500 men, but only 600 were available, mostly Rhode Island troops of the Continental Army commanded by Colonel Christopher Greene, also a Rhode Islander. French officer Thomas Duplessis made the fort more defensible by the small garrison by having a wall built inside the river side of the fort.

On October 22, 1777, in the Battle of Red Bank, an attack by 900 Hessian troops under British Major-general William Howe, then occupying Philadelphia, was repelled by Fort Mifflin's defenders with heavy losses on the Hessian side, over 300 casualties including the death of their commander, Colonel Carl von Donop. The defenders suffered only 40 casualties. Row galleys of the Continental Navy and Pennsylvania State Navy under Commodore John Hazelwood provided supporting fire. Six British warships under the command of Admiral Francis Reynolds were also involved, two of which ran aground while avoiding the chevaux de frise.

Fort Mifflin and the Pennsylvanian galleys engaged the stranded ships the next morning, with cannons and fire rafts, respectively. The 64-gun HMS Augusta caught fire and within an hour the fire reached the magazine and the ship exploded, with the loss being attributed to accidental ignition by the British. One account states a British marine accidentally fired his musket into a hammock, with the fire resulting from subsequent smoldering. HMS Merlin was scuttled after suffering heavy damage. After the later loss of Fort Mifflin, Fort Mercer was abandoned when Lord Charles Cornwallis landed 2,000 British troops nearby on November 18, 1777.

As British artillery breached the walls, the defenders of Fort Mercer blew up their magazine before abandoning the fort.

The British abandoned Fort Mercer as they evacuated Philadelphia on June 18, 1778. The Patriots retook the site and rebuilt the fort, manning it until 1781, when the fighting moved to Yorktown, Virginia, culminating in an American victory and leading to the cessation of hostilities.

== Gallery ==
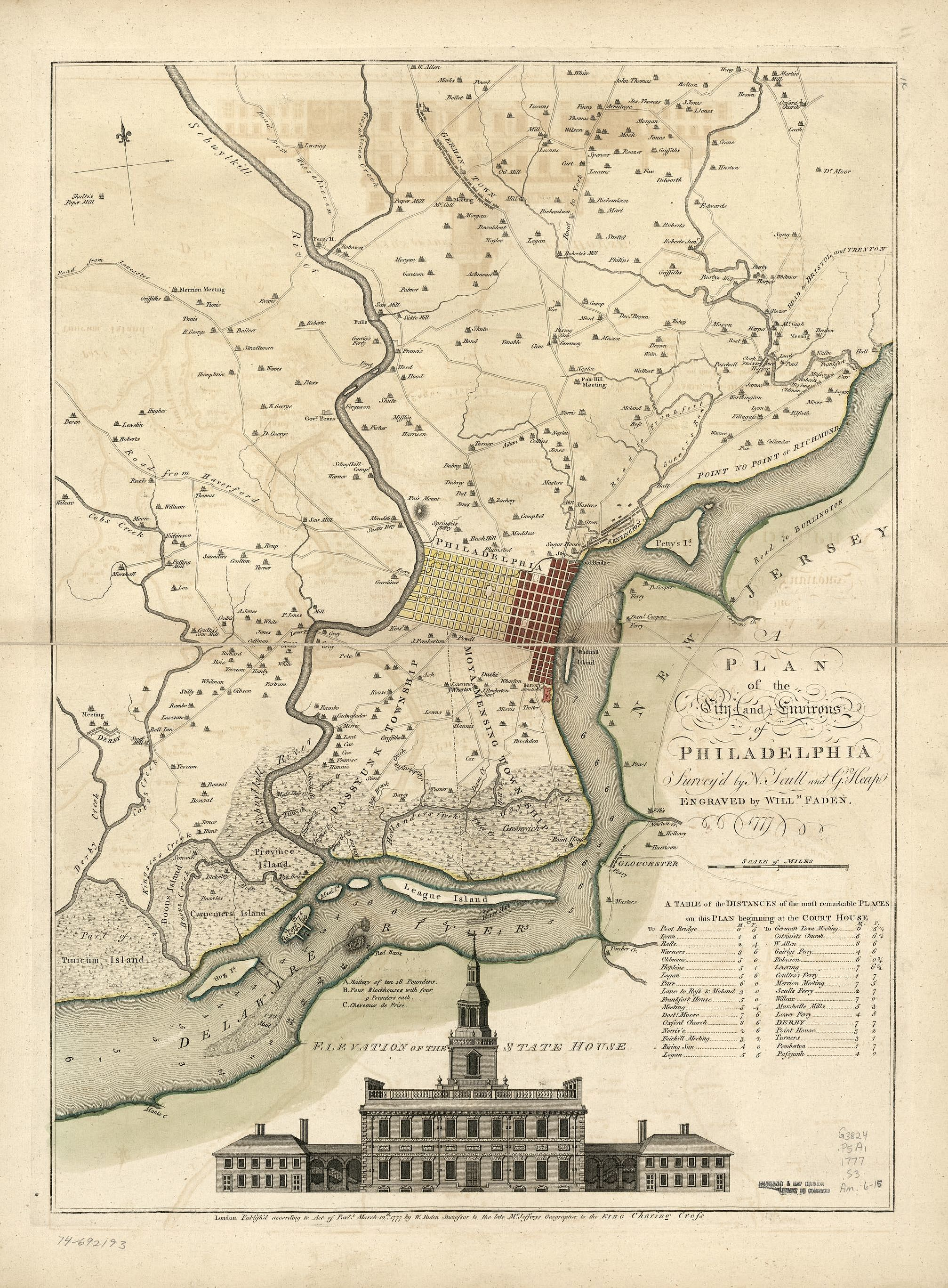

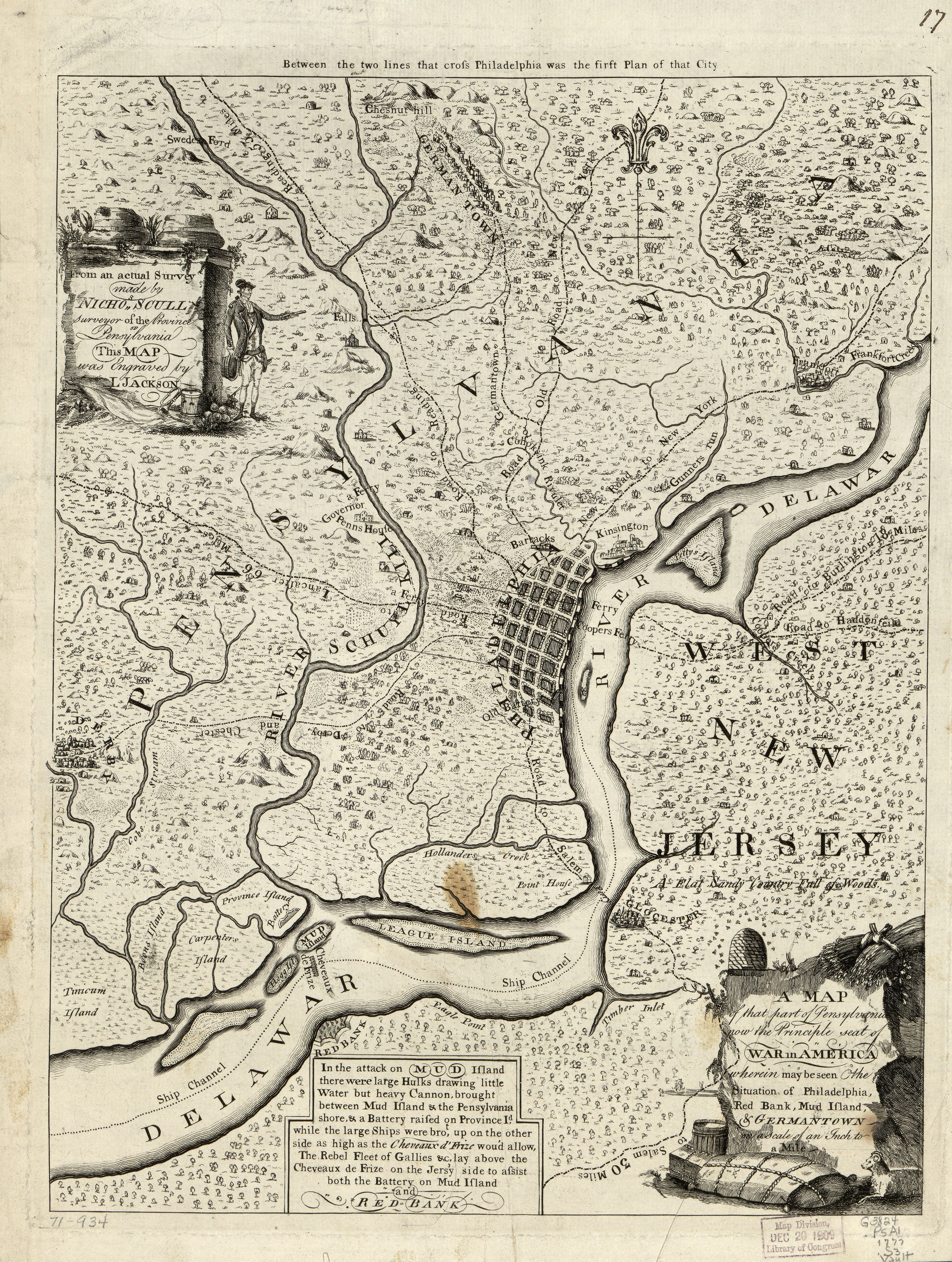

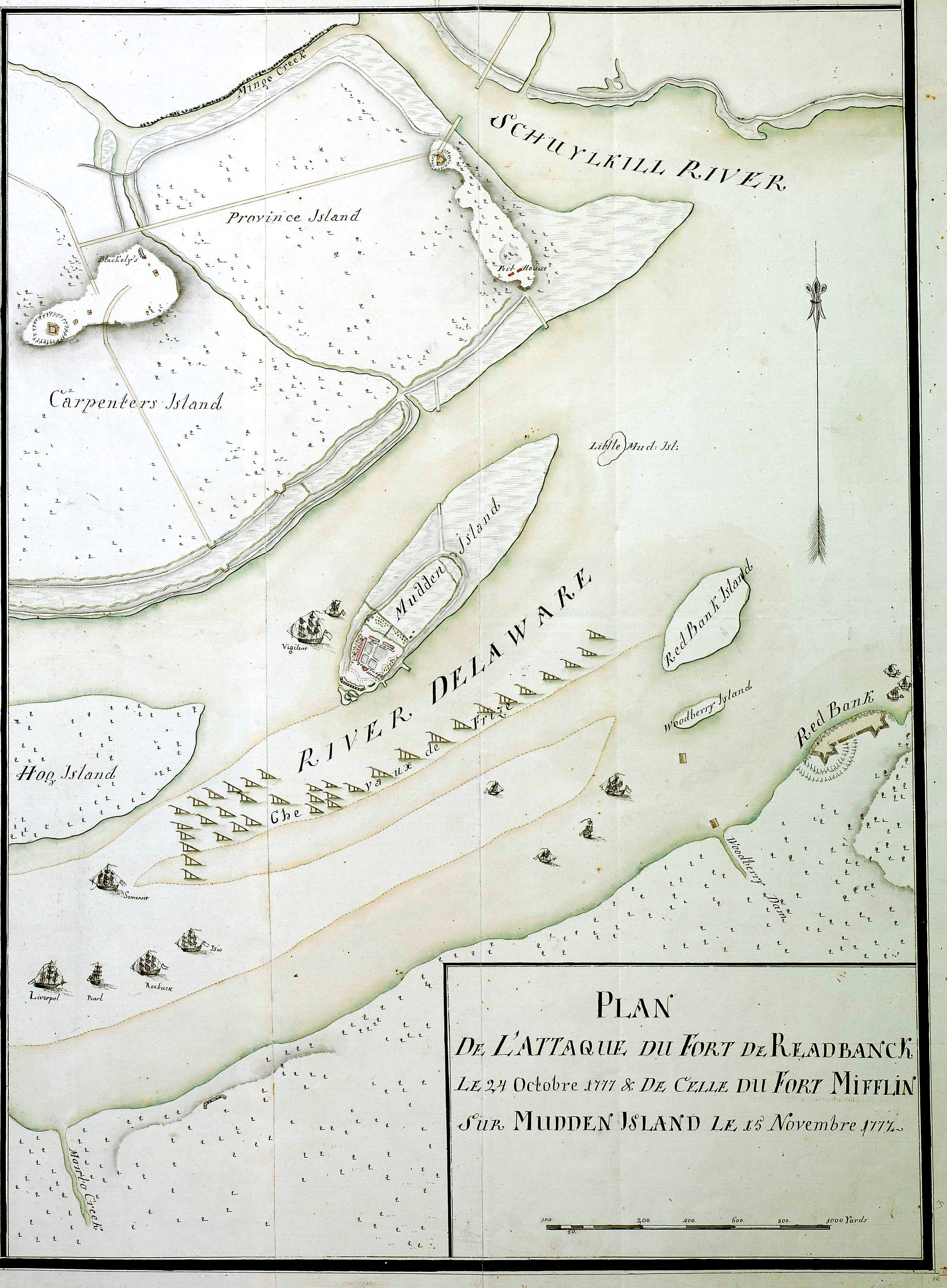

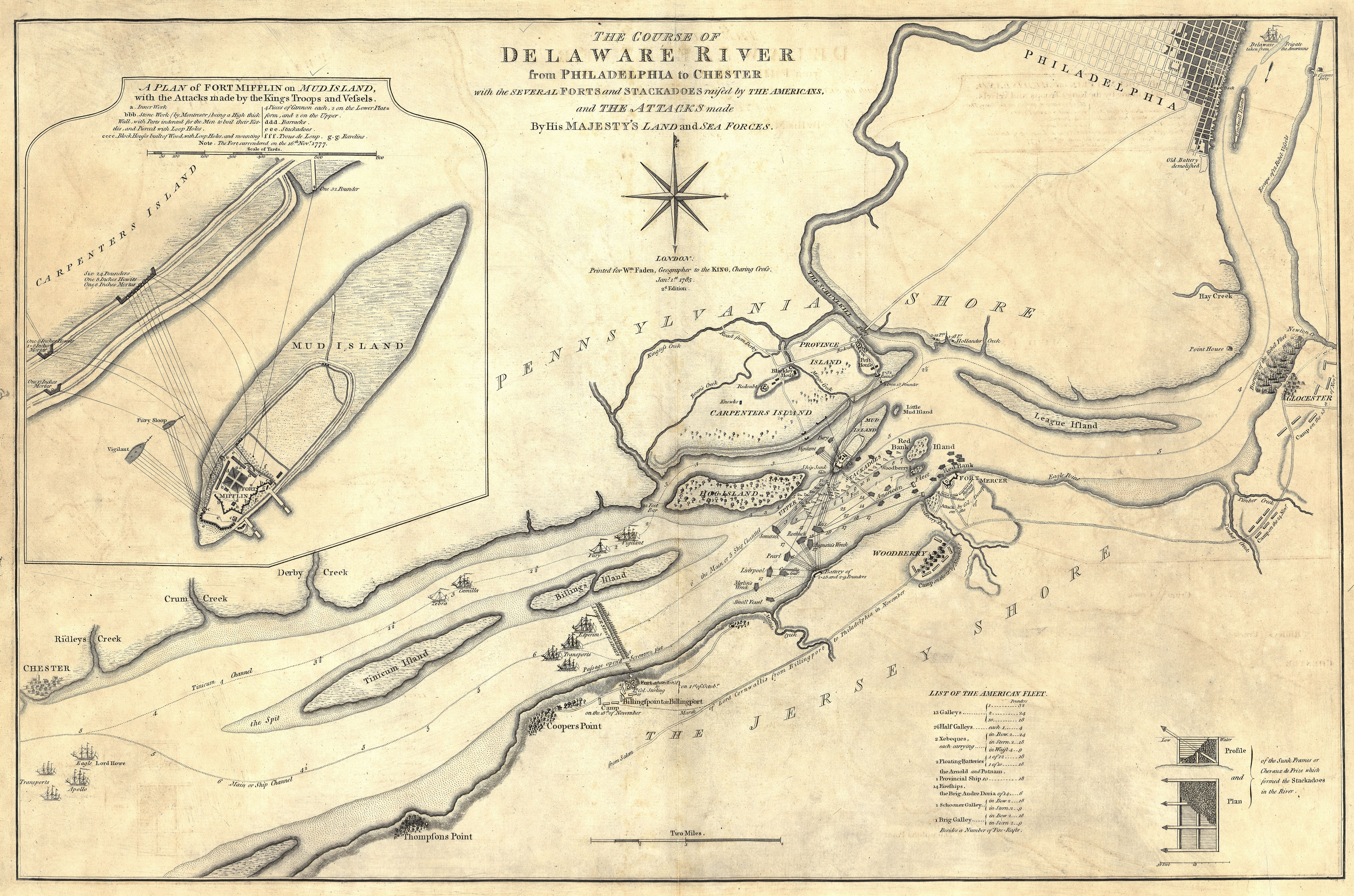

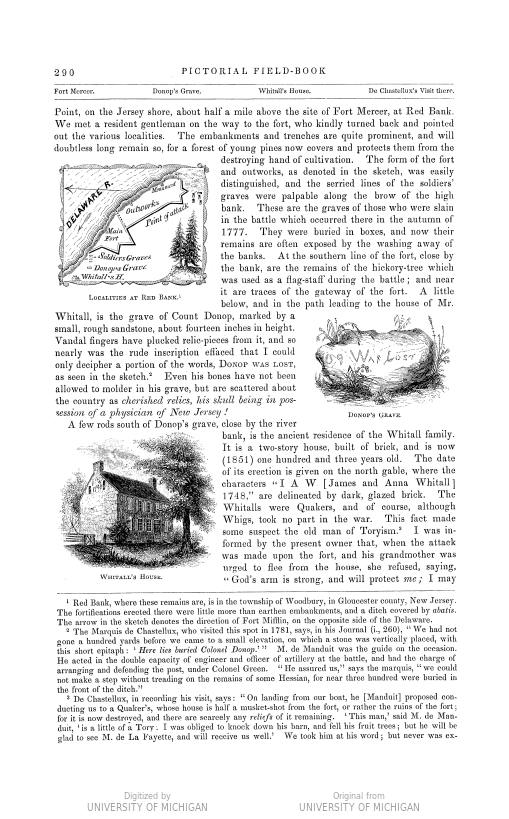
Von Donop Gravesite Battlefield of Red Bank

== See also ==
- Fort Billingsport
- Fort Mifflin
- List of coastal fortifications of the United States
- National Register of Historic Places listings in Gloucester County, New Jersey
- Seacoast defense in the United States
