= Cheval de frise =

Defensive obstacle

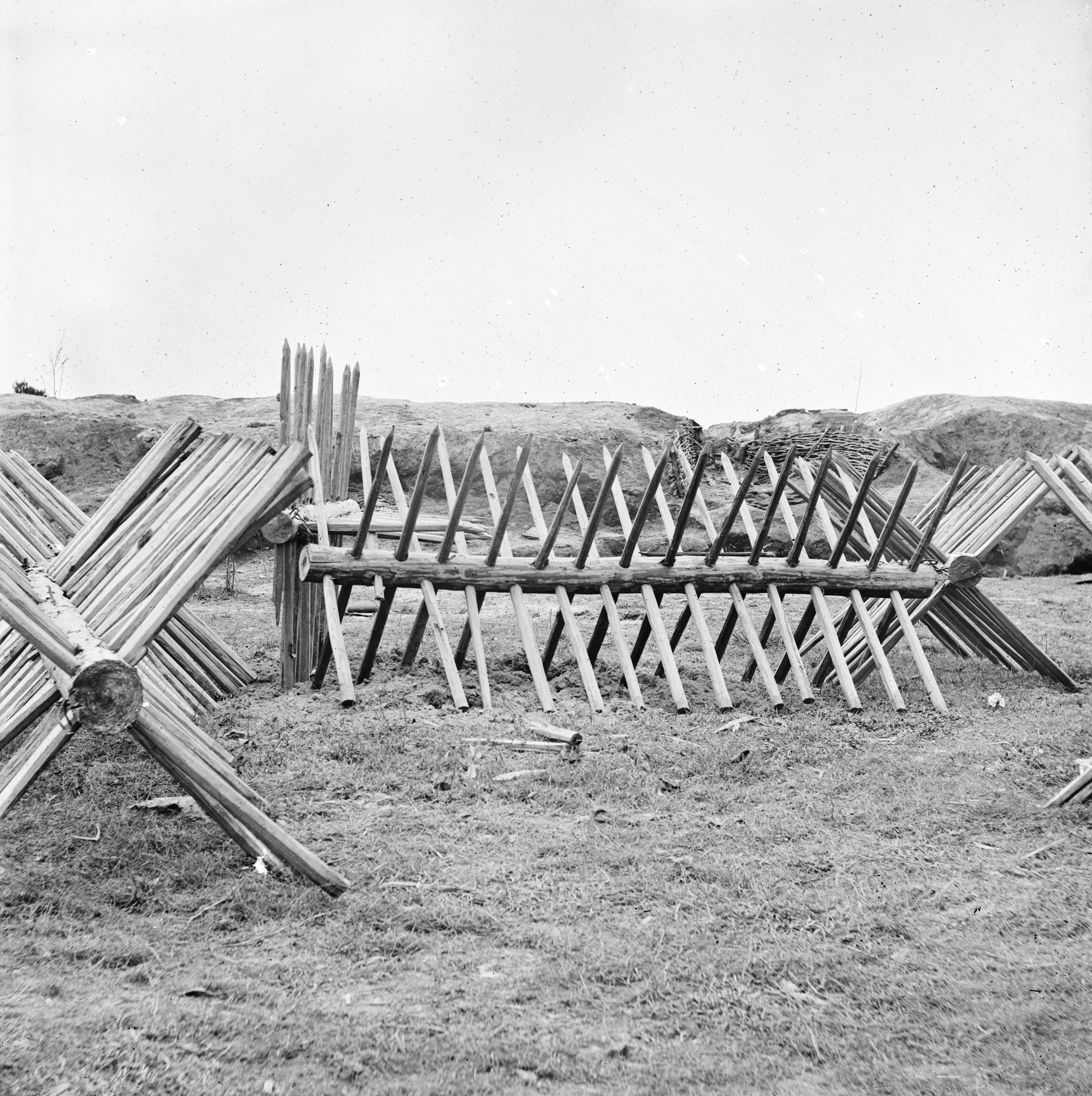
A Confederate cheval de frise at the Fort Mahone defenses during the siege of Petersburg

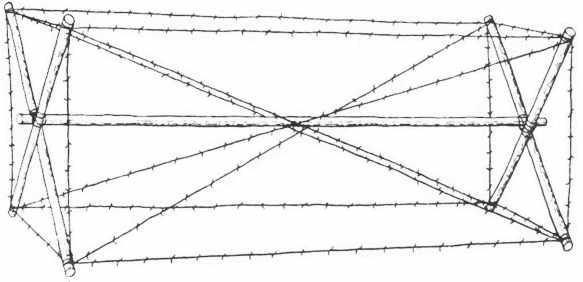
The knife rest, or Spanish rider – a modern wire obstacle of similar function – is sometimes also called cheval de frise.

The cheval de frise (/ʃəˈvɑːl də ˈfriːz/, plural chevaux de frise /ʃəˈvoʊ də ˈfriːz/; French pronunciation: [ʃə.val də fʁiz], plural [ʃə.vo də fʁiz], literally 'Frisian horses', not to be confused with the animal Friesian horse) is a defensive obstacle, existing in a number of forms, principally as a static anti-cavalry obstacle but also quickly movable to close breaches. The term was also applied to underwater constructions used to prevent the passage of ships or other vessels on rivers. In the anti-cavalry role the cheval de frise typically comprised a portable frame (sometimes just a simple log) with many projecting spikes. Wire obstacles ultimately made this type of device obsolete.

The invention of the cheval de frise is attributed to ancient China. The concept of using a defensive obstacle made of wooden or metal stakes predates its use in Europe. Historical records suggest that similar types of defensive barriers, known as teng pai or mó pai, were used in China as early as the 4th century BC. These early versions of the cheval de frise were employed to protect cities, forts, and other strategic locations from enemy attacks. In Ming dynasty military treatises, it was known as the jùmǎ (拒馬, lit. "horse repeller") or lùjiǎo (鹿角, "deer horn").

The use of chevaux de frise spread to Europe during the Middle Ages and became a common feature of medieval fortifications. They were used extensively in castle defenses and military campaigns, particularly during the Renaissance and early modern periods.

During the American Civil War the Confederates used them more than the Union forces. During World War I, armies used chevaux de frise to temporarily plug gaps in barbed wire. Barbed wire chevaux de frise were used in jungle fighting on the South Pacific islands during World War II.

The term is also applied to defensive works on buildings. This includes a series of closely set upright stones found outside the ramparts of Iron Age hillforts in northern Europe, or iron spikes outside homes in Charleston, South Carolina.

== Etymology ==
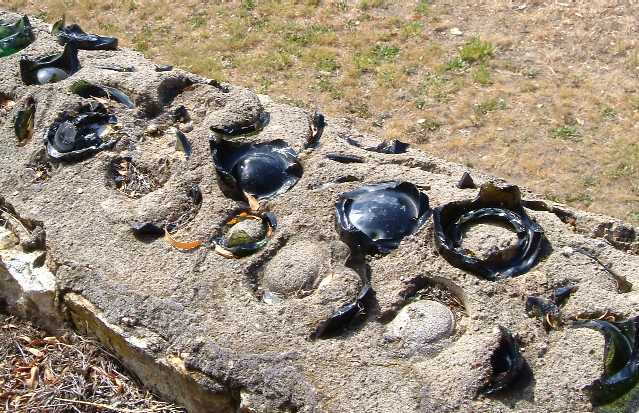
Chevaux de frise, according to the later use of the term, could include broken glass studding the top of a wall in a nineteenth-century fort.

In French, cheval de frise means 'Frisian horse'. The Frisians fought predominantly using infantry against feudal armies with mounted knights. Therefore, they relied heavily on anti-cavalry obstacles. More generally, the Dutch also adopted the use of these defensive devices when at war with Spain. The term cheval de frise came to be used for any obstacle with spikes designed to injure someone or something passing over it, such as broken glass embedded in mortar at the top of a wall.

The cheval de frise was adopted in New York and Pennsylvania during the American Revolutionary War as a defensive measure installed on rivers to prevent upriver movement by enemy ships. During the Peninsular War, at the Siege of Badajoz (1812), a cheval de frise was used to fill a breach in the town wall, allowing the French to inflict heavy casualties on the British storm troops.

== American Revolutionary War ==
During the American Revolutionary War both Thaddeus Kosciuszko and Robert Erskine designed an anti-ship version of the cheval-de-frise to prevent British warships from proceeding up the Delaware River and Hudson River, respectively. A cheval de frise of Erskine's design was placed between Fort Washington at northern Manhattan and Fort Lee in New Jersey in 1776. The following year construction began on one to the north of West Point at Pollepel Island, but it was overshadowed by the completion of the Great Chain across the Hudson in 1778, which was used through 1782.

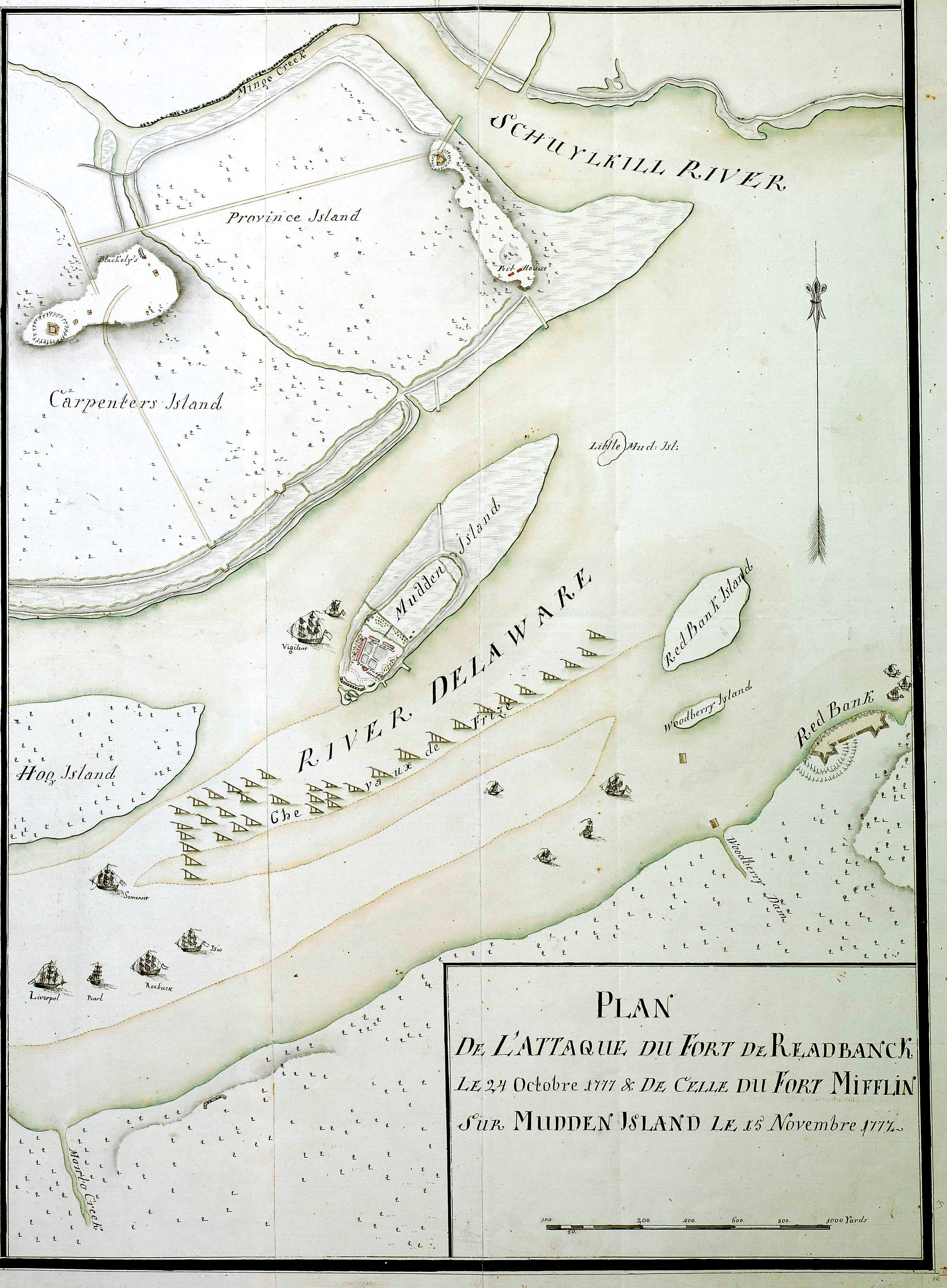
Hessian map showing the placement of chevaux de frise in the Delaware River in 1777

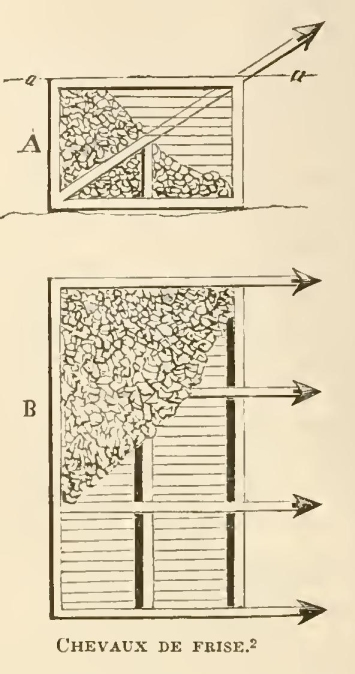
Outline showing the structure of a Cheval de frise for river use: Illustration A: Side view; Illustration B: Top view

Similar devices planned by Ben Franklin and designed by Robert Smith were used in the Delaware River near Philadelphia, between Fort Mifflin and Fort Mercer. Two other lines of chevaux-de-frise were also placed across the Delaware River at Marcus Hook, Pennsylvania and Fort Billingsport, New Jersey as a first line of defense for Philadelphia against the British naval forces.

A cheval de frise was retrieved from the Delaware River in Philadelphia on November 13, 2007, in excellent condition, after more than two centuries in the river. In November 2012, a 29-foot (9 m) spike from a cheval-de-frise was recovered from Delaware off Bristol Township; it was also believed to be from the Revolutionary era installation at Philadelphia and freed up by Hurricane Sandy earlier that fall.

== Legacy ==
A small promontory on the north-east Essex coast in the United Kingdom (UK), between Holland Haven and Frinton-on-Sea, was named Chevaux de Frise Point.

== See also ==
- Czech hedgehog
