= Action of 4 February 1781 =

1781 Fourth Anglo-Dutch War naval engagement

- Part of the Fourth Anglo-Dutch War
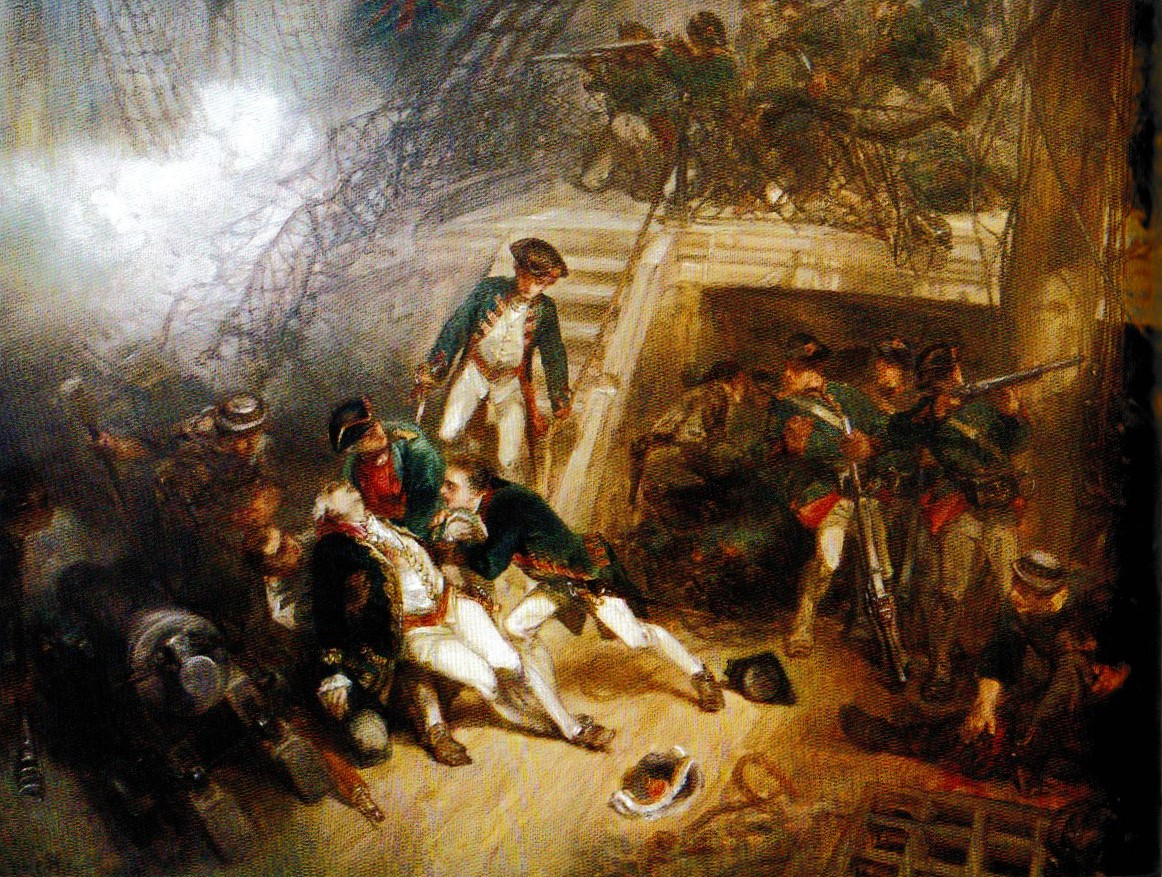
- 1886 painting of the action by Charles Rochussen
Date	4 February 1781
Location	Off Sombrero, Caribbean Sea
Result	British victory

Belligerents
Great Britain	Dutch Republic

Commanders and leaders
Francis Moreton	Willem Krul †

Strength
2 ships of the line 1 frigate	1 ship of the line 30 merchant ships

Casualties and losses
3 wounded	7 wounded 8 killed 1 ship of the line captured 30 merchant ships captured

The action of 4 February 1781 was fought off Sombrero, Anguilla, during Fourth Anglo-Dutch War between the British and Dutch navies. A British squadron of two ships of the line and one frigate under Captain Francis Reynolds captured a Dutch ship of the line under Schout-bij-nacht Willem Krul along with a convoy of 30 merchantmen he was escorting.

The action occurred soon after a British force under Admiral of the White Sir George Rodney captured the Dutch colony of Sint Eustatius during the opening stages of the war. Following the capture of the colony, Rodney received intelligence about the convoy and sent Reynolds to capture it. On 4 February, Reynolds' squadron managed to catch up with the Dutch convoy and engage the lone Dutch ship of the line, the 60-gun Mars, which proved no match for the superior British squadron. After 30 minutes of being pounded with a furious cannonade from the British ships, Krul was killed and Mars struck her colours. The helpless convoy were all easily captured and brought back to British territory.

== Background ==
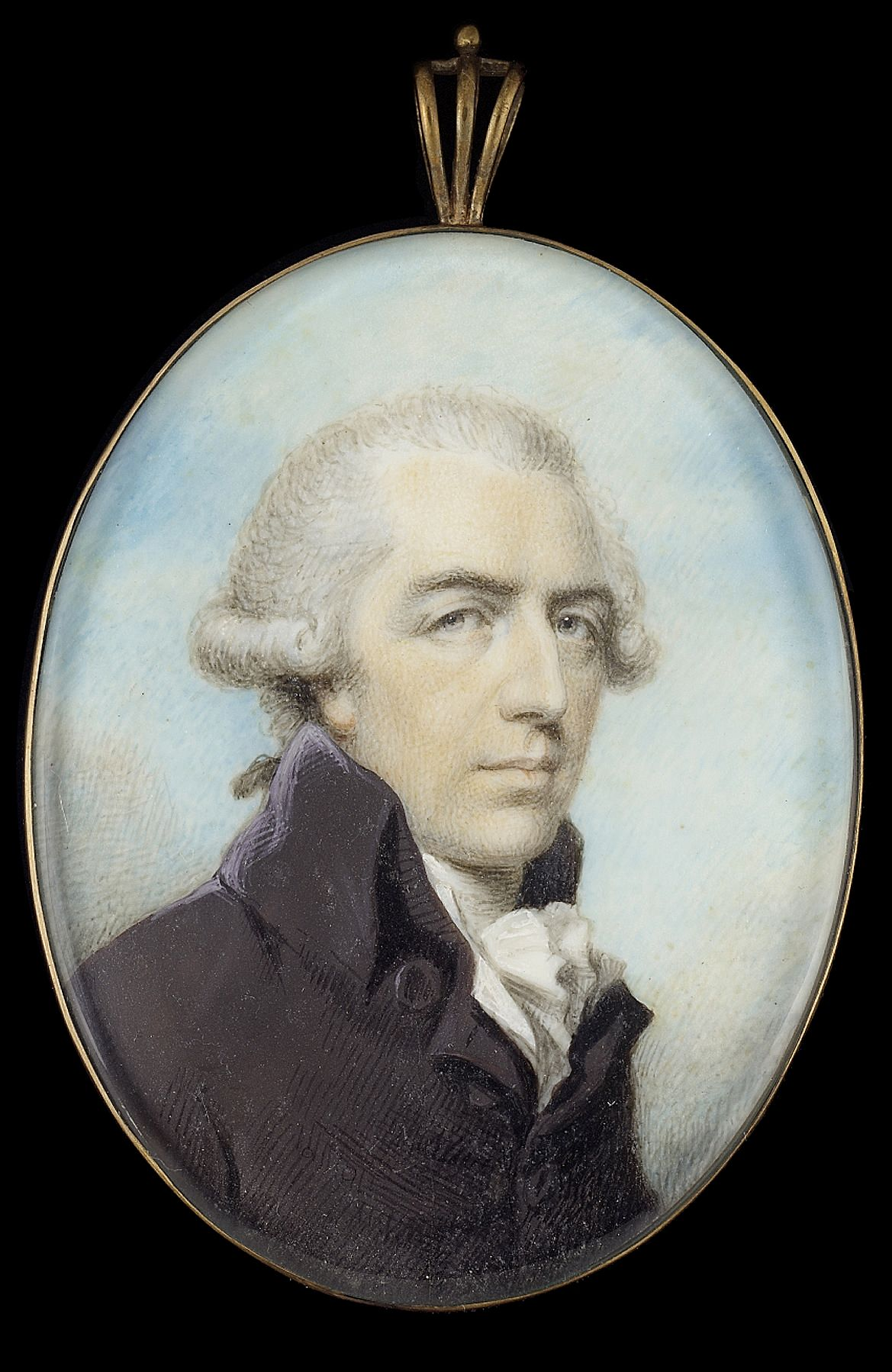
Francis Reynolds, the British commander at the action

On 20 December 1780, Great Britain declared war on the Dutch Republic, iniating the Fourth Anglo-Dutch War. Following the outbreak of the war, British Admiral of the White George Rodney was ordered to lead an expedition to capture the Dutch colony of Sint Eustatius, an entrepôt that operated as a major trading centre despite its relatively small size. Rodney was already in the West Indies as part of his service in the War of American Independence, and his expedition arrived at Sint Eustatius on 3 February 1781. The Dutch garrison quickly surrendered in the face of overwhelming British numbers, and were captured along with all the merchantmen in the colony's harbour. Rodney subsequently received intelligence that a Dutch convoy of 30 merchantmen laden with sugar and other commodities had just before his arrival set sail from Sint Eustatius for Holland under the escort of a 60-gun ship of the line of the Dutch States Navy. He immediately sent a squadron of two ships of the line and a frigate under Captain Francis Reynolds to pursue the convoy.

== Action ==
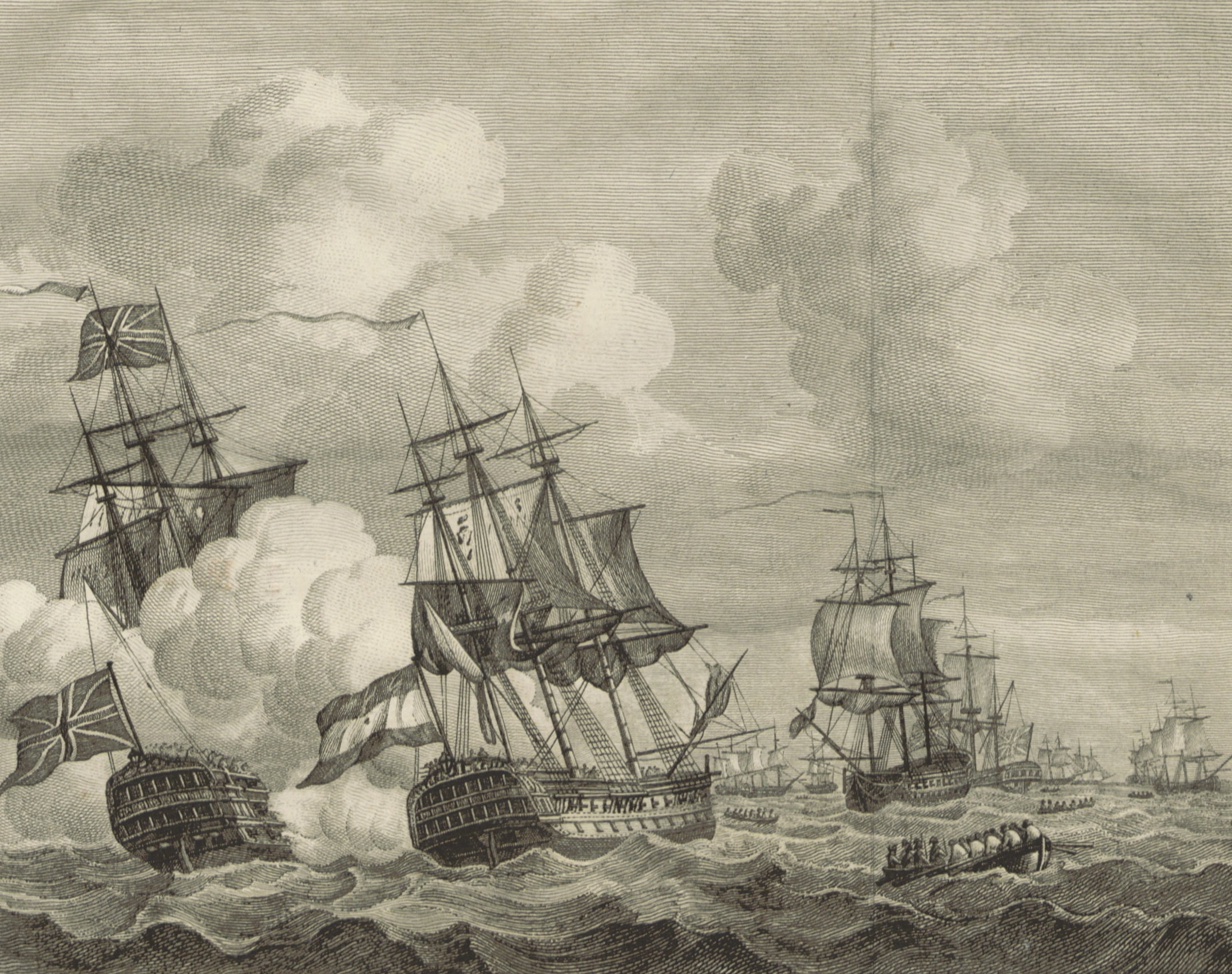
1807 engraving of the action

The British forces sailed for a while before sighting the Dutch convoy and manoeuvring their ships to engage the lone Dutch ship of the line, with the intention to force her to surrender from overwhelming firepower. This force consisted of the Monarch and Panther, along with the frigate Sybil. Monarch and its crew had already been engaged at the Battle of Ushant along with other engagements. Panther had participated in the successful expedition against Spanish-held Havana in 1762 during the Seven Years' War, and had captured a treasure-laden Spanish galleon. Sybil was the one warship to have never have seen action before this engagement. The combined force sighted the Dutch convoy on 4 February, not long after Rodney's capture of Sint Eustatius. Reynolds-Moreton ordered his ships to concentrate their efforts on the Dutch ship, which quickly became surrounded. Despite the obvious inferiority in the strength of the two forces, Krul ordered his men to run out the guns and respond to the sporadic cannon fire coming from the British ships. Monarch sailed and anchored alongside the port side of Mars while Sybil sailed and anchored alongside the starboard side. Panther sailed directly behind Mars to rake her from behind.

The action began to grow in intensity, as at the same time the merchant ships realised what was developing and attempted to escape. The combined pounding went on for 30 minutes with furious fire coming from both sides, with Mars refusing to surrender as her crew attempted to give the Dutch merchantmen time to escape. After the battle had gone on for half an hour, Krul suffered a fatal injury and with his dying breath summoned his flag captain, and ordered him to strike the colours of the ship. The British came aboard to take possession of Mars, and then immediately weighed anchor in the direction of the escaping merchant ships. After a brief chase, all 30 of them were bloodlessly captured. Total casualties for the British amounted to just three wounded and none killed, while the Dutch suffered seven wounded and eight killed, among them Krul. With the action concluded, Reynolds-Moreton ordered his ships to sail back to Sint Eustatius, all 31 prizes safely in tow. The body of Krul was safely preserved during the return voyage.

== Aftermath ==
After a short journey, Reynolds-Moreton arrived back in the harbour of Sint Eustatius with his prizes. The 30 merchantmen had their valuable cargo brought ashore, and prize money was distributed to the crews. Krul's corpse, preserved during the voyage back to Sint Eustatius, was buried in a local cemetery with full military honors, in recognition of his valiant conduct during the action. The Mars was taken into British service as Prince Edward under Capt. George Pulteney, then Capt. James Macnamara. She sailed to Britain with prizes from St Eustatius, survived the battle with the French escadre of Toussaint-Guillaume Picquet de la Motte. Later she was fitted as a receiving ship and served in this capacity until sold at Chatham for £680 on 24.3.1802

== Order of battle ==
Ship	Commander	Navy	Guns	Casualties		
Ship	Commander	Navy	Guns	Killed	Wounded	Total
HMS Monarch	Francis Reynolds		74	0	2	2
HMS Panther	John Harvey		74	0	1	1
HMS Sibyl	Lord Charles FitzGerald		28	0	0	0
Mars	Willem Krul †		60	8	7	15

== See also ==
- Fourth Anglo-Dutch War

== Bibliography ==
- Trew, Peter (2006). Rodney & The Breaking of the line.. Pen & Sword. ISBN 9781844151431.
- Winfield, Rif (2007). British Warships in the Age of Sail 1714–1792: Design, Construction, Careers and Fates.. Seaforth. ISBN 9781844157006.

=== Further reading ===
- Jameson, J. Franklin (July 1903). "St. Eustatius in the American Revolution". The American Historical Review. 8 (4). Oxford University Press on behalf of the American Historical Association: 683–708. doi:10.2307/1834346. JSTOR 1834346.
