= List of lighthouses in Anguilla =

This is a list of active lighthouses in Anguilla.

== Lighthouses ==
Name	Image	Year built	Location & coordinates	Class of Light	Focal height	NGA number	Admiralty number	Range nml
Anguillita Lighthouse		n/a	Anguillita; 18°09′29.3″N 63°10′32.6″W	Fl (2) W 15s.	8 metres (26 ft)	14716	J5656	5
Road Point Lighthouse	Image	n/a	Anguilla; 18°12′12.6″N 63°05′41.8″W	Fl (2) WR 14s.	16 metres (52 ft)	14720	5656.5	white: 10 red: 6
Sombrero Lighthouse		2001	Sombrero; 18°35′11.7″N 63°25′35.4″W	Fl W 10s.	15 metres (49 ft)	14712	J5650	17
Windward Point Lighthouse	Image	n/a	Anguilla; 18°16′31.2″N 62°57′58.6″W	Fl (3) W 16s.	10 metres (33 ft)	14722	J5656.8	n/a

== See also ==
- Lists of lighthouses and lightvessels
