= HMS Panther (1778) =

History

Great Britain
- Name: HMS Panther
- Builder: Bombay Dockyard
- Launched: 1778
- Fate: Sold in 1814

General characteristics
- Type: Sloop
- Tons burthen: 181 tons
- Length: 82 ft (25 m)
- Beam: 21 ft (6.4 m)
- Propulsion: Sails
- Sail plan: Full-rigged ship
- Armament: 14 guns

HMS Panther was a 14-gun sloop of war of the Royal Navy, launched in 1778 in India.

Panther participated in the Fourth Anglo-Dutch War at the Capture of Sint Eustatius, in the West Indies, where it was sent as part of a three ship fleet, under the command of Admiral Reynolds in pursuit of a Dutch convey, escorted by Admiral Krull, that had left Eustatius the day before the arrival of the British.

She served during the Siege of Negapatam in 1781. On 22 July 1782, she captured the French cutter Le Pigmy, in conjunction with HMS Crown. Converted to a survey vessel, she sailed to survey the Torres Strait and south east coast of New Guinea in 1792 under the command of Lieutenant John McCluer, with the tender Endeavour.

Panther appears to have been sold in 1814.

== Sources ==
- Clarke, James Stanier; Jones, Stephen; John, Jones, eds. (1799). The Naval Chronicle. Vol. III. London: J. Gold.
- Lind, L. J. (Lewis James) (1988). Fair winds to Australia : 200 years of sail on the Australia station. Reed. ISBN 978-0-7301-0216-8.
