= Willem Krul =

Dutch States Navy officer (1722–1781)

Schout-bij-nacht Willem Krul
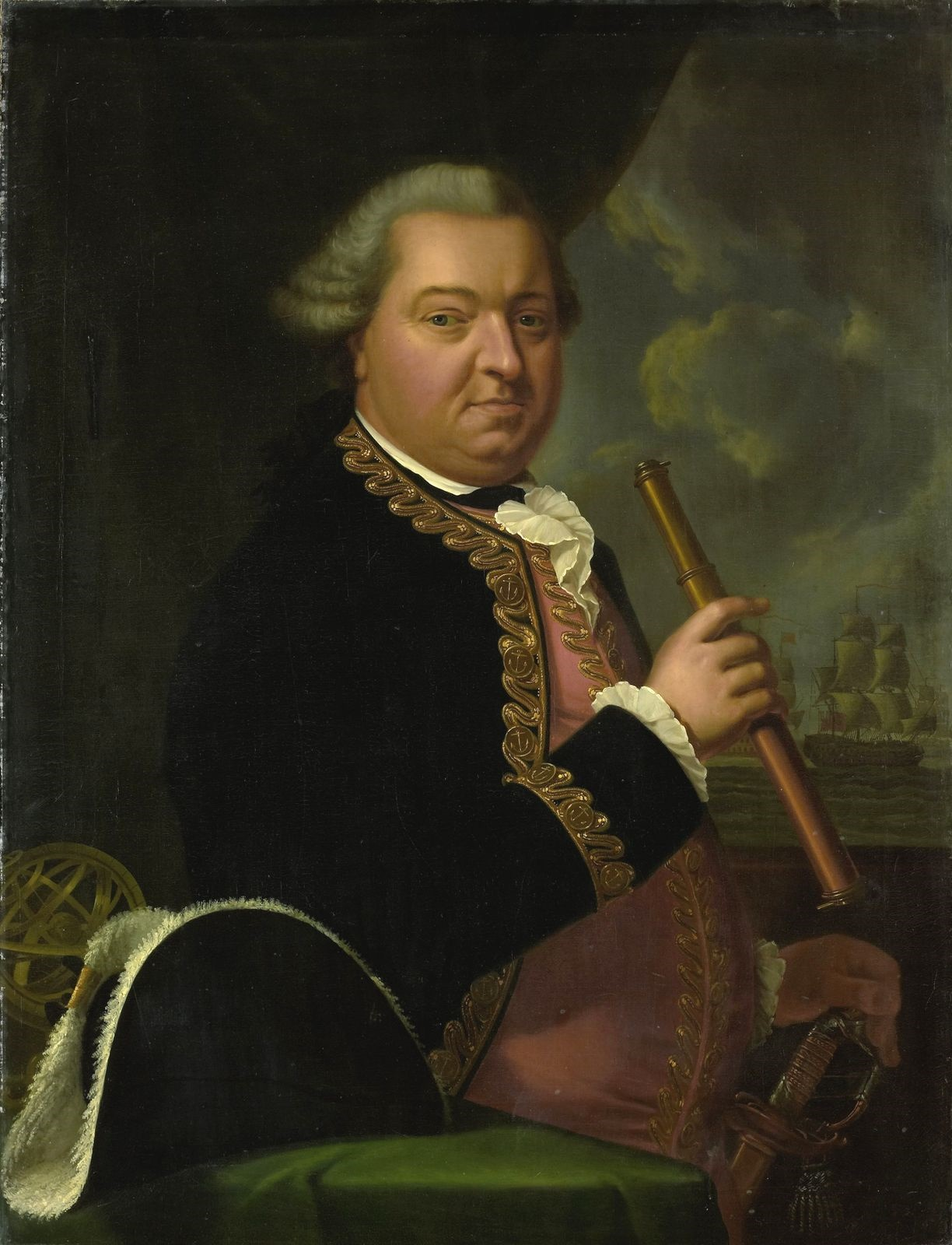
- Portrait by Johann Ernst Heinsius, 1770
- Born: 28 March 1722; The Hague, Dutch Republic
- Died: 4 February 1781 (aged 58) Off Sombrero, Caribbean Sea
- Allegiance: Dutch Republic
- Branch: Dutch States Navy
- Service years: –1781
- Rank: Schout-bij-nacht
- Conflicts: Fourth Anglo–Dutch War; Action of 4 February 1781 †
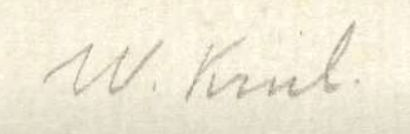
- Signature

Schout-bij-nacht Willem Krul (28 March 1722 – 4 February 1781) was a Dutch States Navy officer who served in the Fourth Anglo-Dutch War. Born and raised in the Hague, Krul joined the Dutch East India Company (VOC) and made a voyage to Batavia between 1742 and 1744. He subsequently joined the Dutch navy and was made captain of a warship in 1752. In 1778, he was again employed by the VOC and was sent to the Dutch colony of Sint Eustatius. Following the outbreak of the Fourth Anglo-Dutch War in December 1780, Krul escorted a convoy of 30 Dutch merchantmen from the West Indies to Holland. A British squadron followed the convoy and at the action of 4 February 1781 killed Krul and captured his ship. Though the entire convoy was captured as well, Krul's defence against the odds made him a national hero in the Dutch Republic.

== Early life ==
Willem Krul was born on 28 March 1722 in the Hague, the son of Arie Krul and Elizabeth Maaskant. Raised in the Hague, Krul's father died shortly after his birth. On 8 February 1746 he married Catrina de Hoogh at the Hague, and together they had a son named Arie Hendrik Willem Krul.

== Early naval service ==
Krul joined the Dutch East India Company (VOC) and in 1742 participated in a voyage to Batavia as a lieutenant on the East Indiaman Anna, returning to Holland in 1744. He subsequently joined the Dutch States Navy and was promoted to captain at sea, being appointed as the caption of Maze in 1752. After moving to Den Bosch in 1753, Krul bought a house in Vught for his mother and two of his then unmarried sisters, Alexandrina and Elizabeth. In 1759 he bought the manor of Landgoed Burgst located north of Breda. (Note: Landgoed Burgst is an estate located in the middle of the Haagse Beemden in the north of Breda. See: Burgst, in Netherlands Wikipedia)

== Final assignment ==
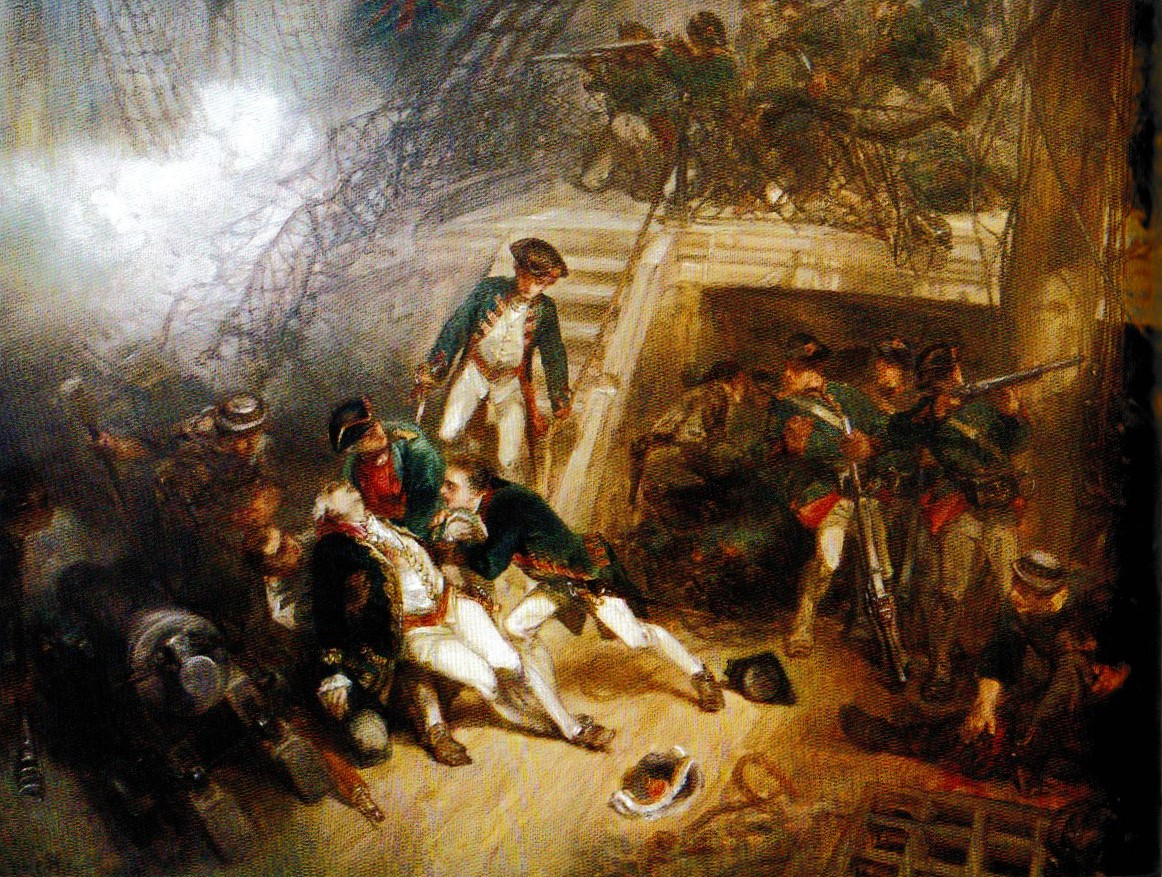
Krul's death during the action of 4 February 1781

Krul was again employed on 19 October 1778 by the VOC and stationed on the Dutch colony of Sint Eustatius which served as an entrepôt during the American Revolutionary War. (Note: During the early years of the Revolutionary War, various island possessions about the Caribbean ensured the steady supply of arms and supplies to the United States and functioned as important channels of communication.) In 1779, he was promoted to the rank of schout-bij-nacht. The Dutch, though their ports were protected by their neutral status, were at the center of the arms trade with the American Patriots and were supplying them via this isle with nearly half of their military supplies. This sort of trading with Britain's enemies is what instigated the Fourth Anglo-Dutch War, in which Admiral of the White Sir George Rodney was subsequently sent to Sint Eustatius in 1781 to neutralize this trade. (Note: Rodney held a particular contempt for this "mere desert" isle and later wrote to his wife, declaring, "... this rock of only six miles in length, and three in breadth, has done England more harm than all the arms of her most potent enemies, and alone supported the infamous American rebellion.") Shortly after he had captured Sint Eustatius, (Note: Also known as Statia.) lying only 50 miles north of British Saint Kitts, Rodney learned that a convoy of 30 Dutch merchantmen richly laden with sugar and other commodities had just sailed for Holland under the escort of Mars, a 60-gun ship of the line commanded by Krul. (Note: Mars carried 60 guns and had a crew of 300 men.) Rodney immediately dispatched three ships, HMS Monarch, Panther and Sybil, under the command of Admiral Francis Reynolds, to give chase and capture the enormous 30 vessel prize, (Note: Historian Friedrich Edler puts the number of vessels at twenty-six.) with orders to pursue them no further than the latitude of Bermuda.

Krul's convoy was soon located and overtaken near the small island of Sombrero, approximately 90 miles north of Saint Eustatius. After surrounding Krul's ship Reynolds called for the immediate and unconditional surrender of the convoy, which was pointedly declined by Krul who didn't know war on the Netherlands had been declared by Britain. During the ensuing engagement on 4 February 1781 Krul, with a single warship, resolved to uphold the honor of the Dutch flag and confront his pursuers with the hopes of giving the cargo ships a chance to escape. In so doing, however, he had grossly underestimated his opponent's overwhelming firepower. During the fierce thirty minute engagement Krul was mortally wounded. The scattered and defenseless convoy were immediately rounded up by Reynolds' faster war ships and escorted back to Saint Eustatius and taken as prizes of war. The body of Krul was safely preserved during the return voyage back to Saint Eustatius where he was buried with full military honors. The advent made him a national hero in the Netherlands, which soon inspired many works of art. The Rijksmuseum's collection contains at least 21 works of art relating to the naval battle and the death of Willem Krul.

Selected works taken from reproductions in various sources

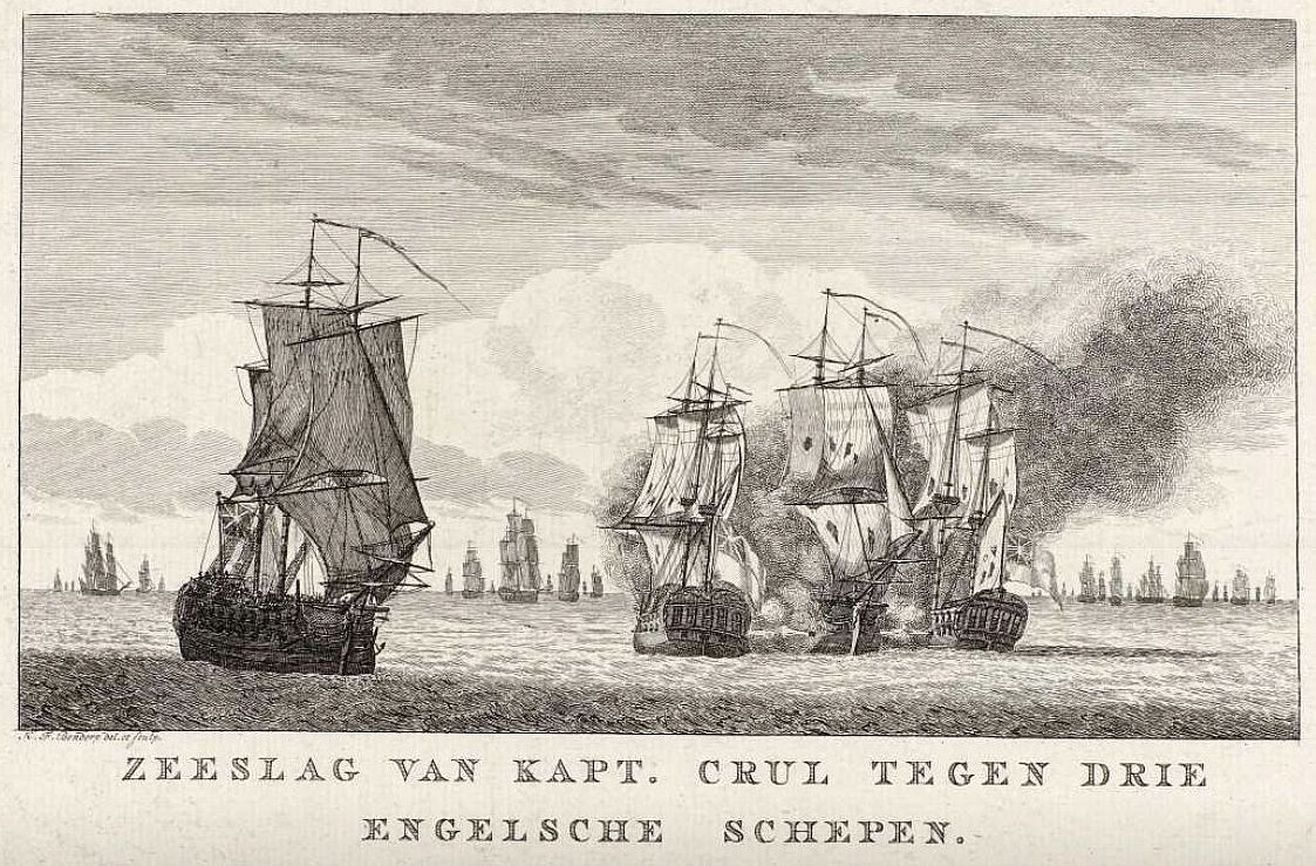
Naval battle of Captain Krul against three English ships
Engraving by Carl Frederik Bendorp, 1781

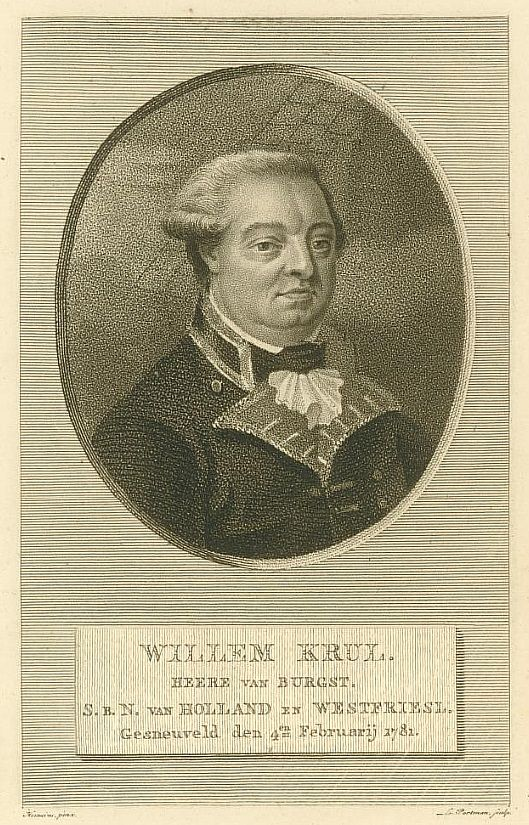
Willem Krul
by Cornelius van Rodenburgh, 1808

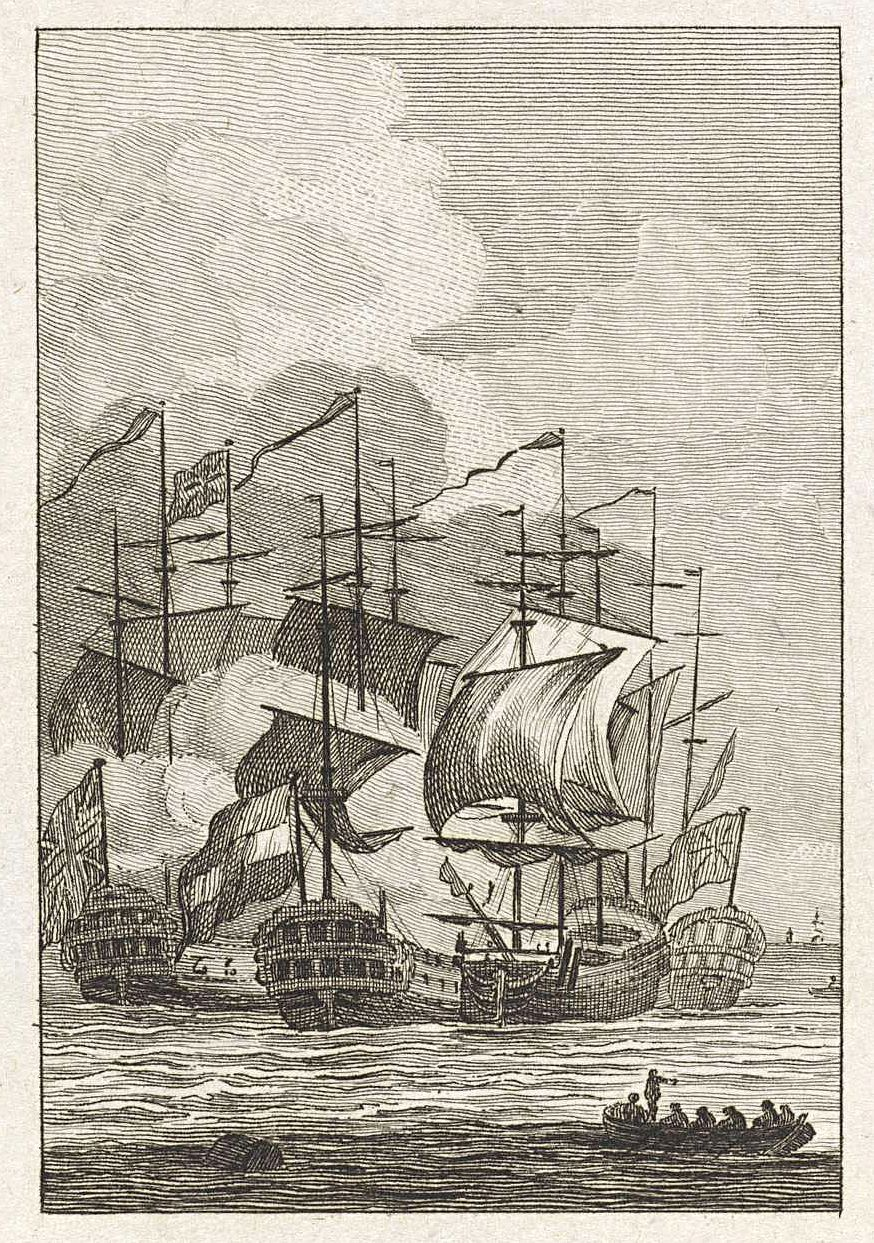
Naval battle of Captain Krul
against three English ships
Engraving by Reinier Vinkeles, 1781

== See also ==
- Naval history of the Netherlands
- Johannes de Graaff, Governor of Sint Eustatius, in the Netherlands Antilles during the American Revolutionary War.
- Fourth Anglo-Dutch War
- Royal Netherlands Navy
- Bibliography of early American naval history

== Bibliography ==
- Botta, Carlo (1834). History of the war of independence of the United States of America. Vol. II. New Haven : Nathan Whiting.
- Clowes, William Laird; Markham, Clements Robert, Sir.; Mahan, Alfred Thayer; Wilson, Herbert Wrigley (1897–1903). The royal navy, a history from the earliest times to present. Vol. III. London : Samson Low, Marston, Co.
- Hannay, David (1903). Rodney. London, New York, Macmillan and Co.
- Hiscocks, Richard (2018). "Francis Reynolds-Moreton 3rd Lord Ducie". morethannelson.
- Jones, Howard (2002). Crucible of Power: A History of American Foreign Relations to 1913. Scholarly Resources Inc. p. 5. ISBN 978-0-8420-2916-2.
- Jong, Cornelius de (1807). Reize naar de Caribische Eilanden in de jaren 1780 en 1781. Haarlem.
- Mundy, Godfrey Basil (1830). The life and correspondence of the late Admiral Lord Rodney. London : J. Murray.
- OpenArchives
- Oostindie, Gert (2014). "Dutch Atlantic Decline during "The Age of Revolutions"". Dutch Atlantic Decline during The Age of Revolutions. Brill. pp. 309–336. doi:10.1163/9789004271319_014. ISBN 9789004271319. JSTOR 10.1163/j.ctt1w8h3c9.18.
- Postma, Jan (2017). Alexander Gogel (1765–1821): Founder of the Dutch state. Uitgeverij Verloren. ISBN 978-9-0870-4633-0.
- Vlasity, Sarah Marie (2015). Networks in Favor of Liberty: St Eustatius as an Entrepôt of Goods and Information during the American Revolution (Thesis). William and Mary College. doi:10.21220/s2-7ds9-mj55. "Dissertations, Theses, and Masters Projects. Paper 1539626806."
