= Francis Reynolds-Moreton, 3rd Baron Ducie =

Royal Navy officer and politician (1739–1808)

The Right Honourable The Lord Ducie
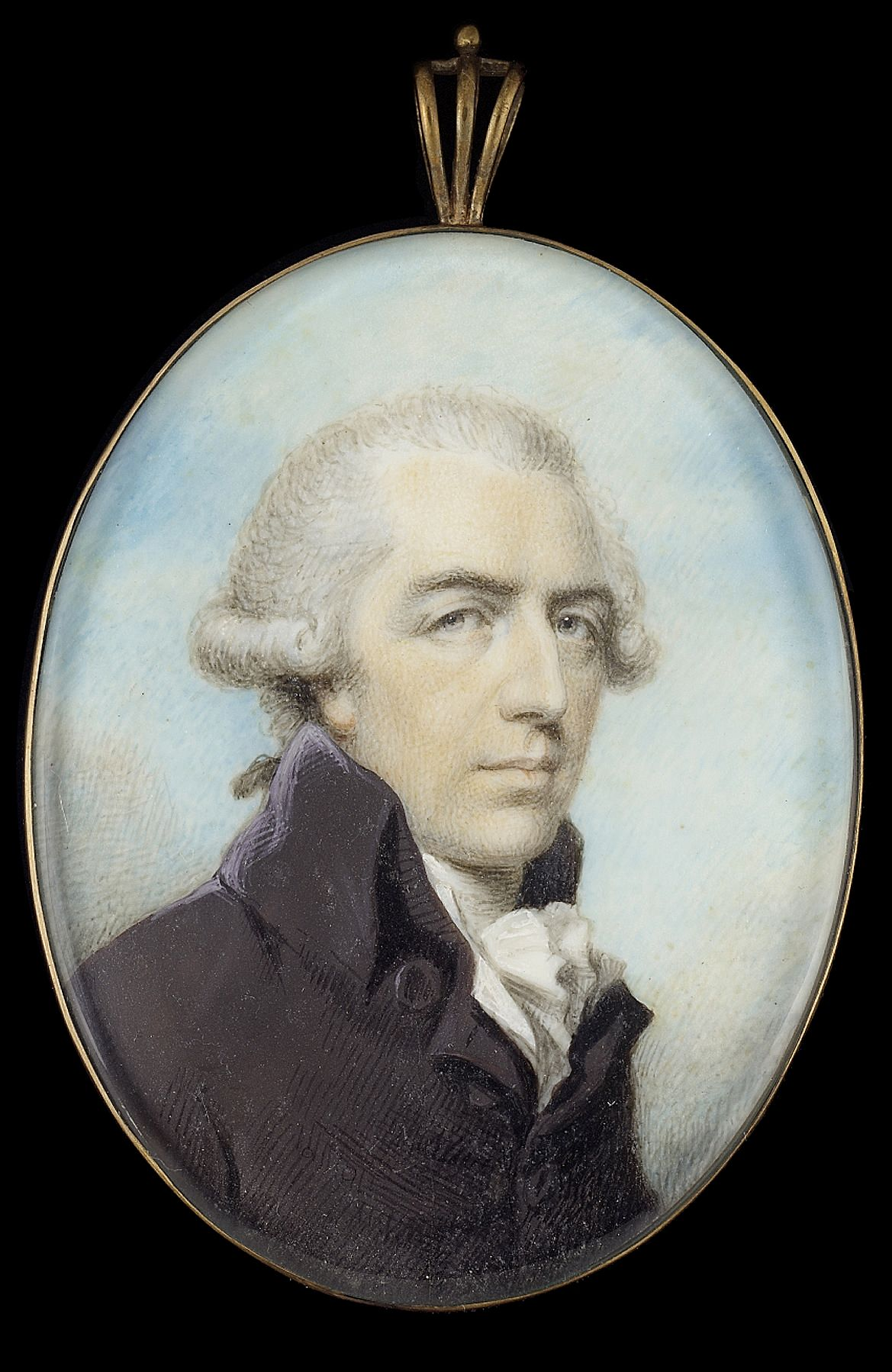
- Portrait by Philip Jean
- Born: Francis Reynolds; 28 March 1739; Strangeways, Manchester
- Died: 20 August 1808 (aged 69)
- Allegiance: Great Britain
- Branch: Royal Navy
- Service years: 1755–1792
- Rank: Captain
- Conflicts: Seven Years' War; American War of Independence; Philadelphia campaign; Siege of Fort Mifflin; Action of 20 October 1778; Fourth Anglo–Dutch War; Capture of Sint Eustatius; Action of 4 February 1781

Captain Francis Reynolds-Moreton, 3rd Baron Ducie (28 March 1739 – 20 August 1808) was a Royal Navy officer and politician who represented Lancaster in the House of Commons of Great Britain from 1784 to 1785. He is best known for his service in the American War of Independence and Fourth Anglo-Dutch War. Reynolds fought at the 1777 Battle of Red Bank during the Philadelphia campaign. During the battle, he was commander of a British squadron onboard HMS Augusta in an attempt to clear the way along the Delaware River to Philadelphia. His ship ran aground while being pursued by American Commodore John Hazelwood's squadron, and Augusta mysteriously caught fire shortly thereafter and exploded before all of the crew could abandon ship. Reynolds also commanded HMS Jupiter and HMS Monarch in several operations and saw service against the French and Dutch in the North Sea, Atlantic Ocean and Caribbean Sea.

== Early life ==
Little is known about the childhood and education of Francis Reynolds. The Ducie family was descended from a family in Normandy. Francis was the son of Francis Reynold and Elizabeth Moreton. He was born at Strangeways, Manchester, and baptized 25 June 1739, at Manchester Cathedral. He assumed the title of Esquire in 1757. He married twice. Firstly in 1774 to Mary Purvis of Shepton Mallet, by whom he had two sons: his heir Thomas, and Augustus John, who became a lieutenant colonel in the British Army's 1st Regiment of Foot Guards. After Mary's death, he remarried in 1791 to Sarah Child, widow of the London banker Robert Child. His brother, Thomas Reynolds, was the second Baron Ducie of Tortworth. Francis Reynolds assumed the last name of Moreton by Lord Ducie's Name Act 1786 (26 Geo. 3. c. 10 Pr.).

== Military service ==
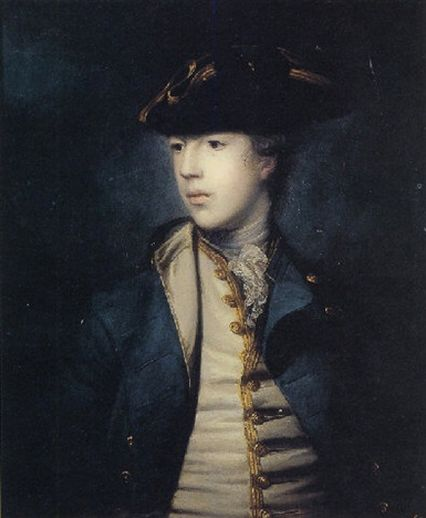
1758 portrait of Reynolds by Sir Joshua Reynolds

After becoming a midshipman in 1755 Reynolds passed the lieutenant's examination on 27 April 1758 and assumed the rank on the next day at the age of 19; he was promoted to master and commander on 21 November 1760. His first known service was in April 1752. During the Seven Years' War Reynolds took command of HMS Weazel, was appointed as provost marshal of Barbados on 16 March 1761 and was promoted to captain on 12 April 1762. He was appointed captain of the 44-gun HMS Ludlow Castle on the same day as his promotion to captain, commanding the ship until 25 May 1762, when she undergoing repairs at Deptford Dockyard. There he joined the small frigate HMS Garland, bearing 24 guns, on 24 May. At the end of that month she sailed for Plymouth, and was assigned to duty off the coast of France and later in a voyage to Africa prior to being paid off at Chatham in February 1763.

=== American War of Independence ===
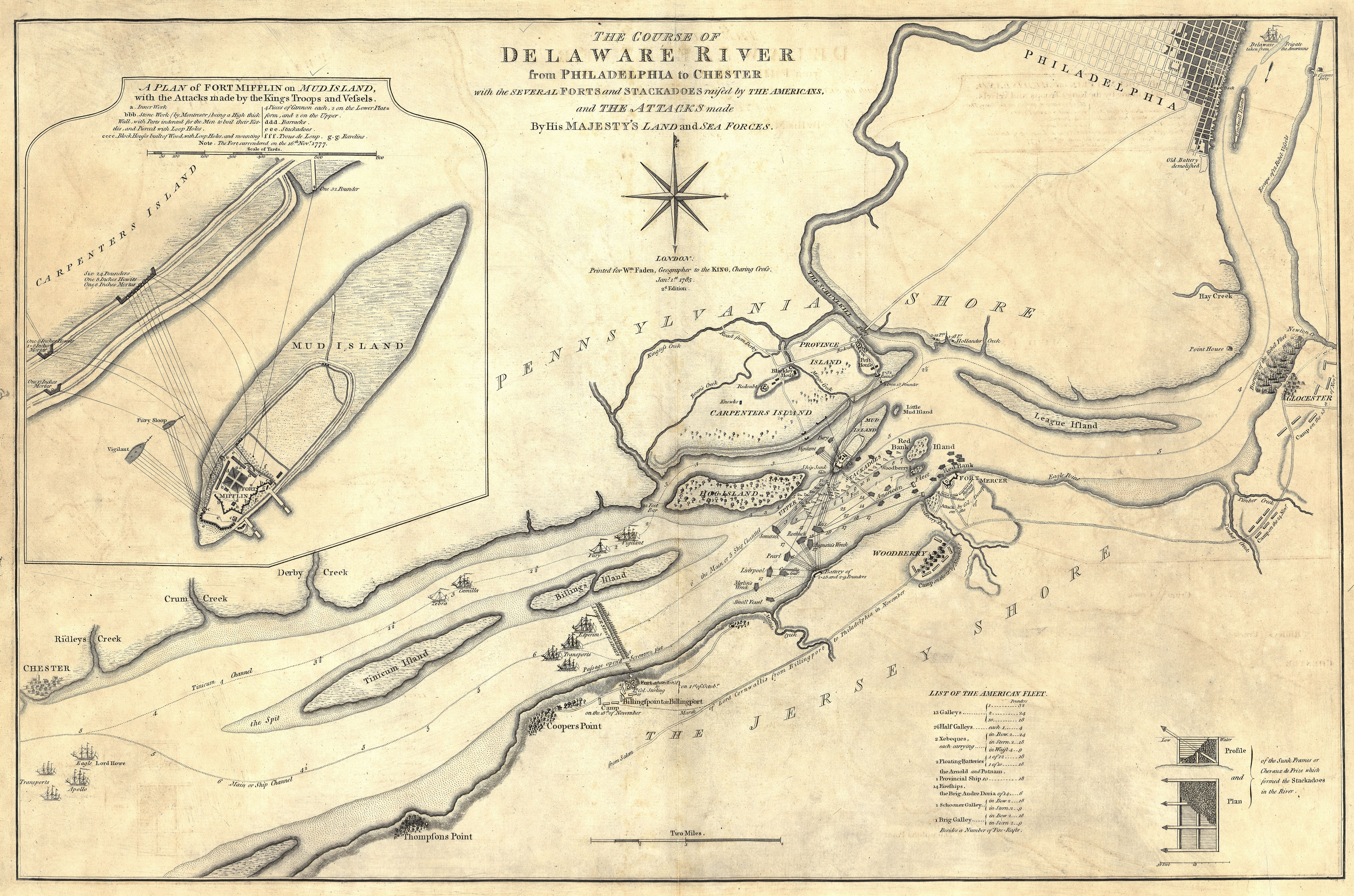
British map depicting the locations of Forts Mercer, Mifflin, Red Bank, the positions of the grounded Augusta and Merlin and other vessels

Reynolds was the commander aboard HMS Augusta, a ship of the line bearing 64 guns, which was part of the advance British fleet (Note: Other ships of Reynolds' advance fleet included HMS Roebuck, with forty-four guns, commanded by Captain A. S. Hamond; HMS Liverpool, twenty-eight guns, Captain Henry Bellew; HMS Pearl, thirty-two guns, Captain Thomas Wilkinson; and HMS Merlin, a sloop-of-war, sixteen guns, Commander Samuel Reeve.) in the effort to reach Philadelphia during the American War of Independence. John Hazelwood, Commodore of the Pennsylvania State Navy and Continental Navy, planned for the defence of the Delaware River approach to Philadelphia during the Siege of Fort Mifflin, which lasted approximately three weeks.

On 12 October 1777, General William Howe issued orders to capture the two newly constructed American forts, Fort Mifflin and Fort Mercer, which were preventing the Royal Navy from resupplying British occupational troops in Philadelphia by way of the Delaware River. British shore batteries established on the Pennsylvania side of the river opened fire on Fort Mifflin, while Colonel Carl von Donop, commanding approximately 2,000 Hessian troops, landed on the New Jersey shore and attacked Fort Mercer. At this time the British navy was advancing up river to lend support to von Donop by bombarding both forts. As von Donop's men assaulted Fort Mercer, Reynolds' advanced Delaware River squadron proceeded up river via the eastern or main channel with the intention of bombarding Fort Mifflin. At the same time Reynolds' fleet were to engage the American galleys harboring off Red Bank in order to draw them away from supporting the Hessian attack on Fort Mercer, however, there was no way for Reynolds' fleet and von Donop's land forces to communicate and coordinate their efforts, which proved ineffectual. (Note: Later into the assault on Fort Mercer von Donop was mortally wounded while some 400 of his soldiers were killed or wounded; the Americans suffered about 40 casualties.)

Hazelwood's ships immediately engaged Reynolds' squadron, forcing it to withdraw down river. With the river tidewater now receding, Reynolds' ship, along with HMS Merlin grounded and stuck fast in a sand bar during an effort to go around the cheval de frise placed in the river, leaving the Augusta tilted at its starboard side. While being engaged by Hazelwood's fleet Reynolds had the crew remove stores of supplies in an effort to lighten its load and free the vessel, but the attempt was futile as more time was needed as a fire broke out below deck and quickly spread, forcing Reynolds and his crew to abandon ship. Shortly thereafter, just past noon, before all of the crew could escape, the fire reached the powder magazine and the Augusta exploded, killing some of the crew members. (Note: The exact number of casualties is not known. Augusta was the largest Royal Navy vessel lost in combat in either the American War of Independence or War of 1812.) Augusta blew up with such great force it was heard 30 miles (48 km) away in Trappe, Pennsylvania. (Note: During this time Thomas Paine was traveling between Germantown and Whitemarsh with General Nathanael Greene's division and could hear the exchange of cannon fire in the battle. In a letter to Benjamin Franklin he exclaimed that he had heard, "A cannonade, by far the most furious I ever heard". Of the explosion he wrote, "...we were stunned with a report as loud as a peal of a hundred cannon at once, and turning round I saw a thick smoke rising like a pillar and spreading from the top like a tree…".) Before leaving the scene, Reynolds had Merlin set on fire to prevent its capture by the Americans. The loss of the Augusta was unexpected and unsettling to the British. After scuttling Merlin Reynolds made his way to the New Jersey shore to a road just south of Billingsport.

Accounts of the explosion vary between the belligerents and among the commanding officer and crew. During their testimony at the inquiry Reynolds or none of the crew could say what actually caused the fire. No one could recall anything that would cause such a fire to break out on the decks or below. Only Midshipman Reid speculated that the fire originated from the cannon wads. Richard Howe seemed to accept this explanation as very likely when he wrote in his diary that "by some Accident, no other way connected with the circumstances of the action but as it was probably caused by the Wads from her guns, the ship took fire abaft". American historian James Fenimore Cooper, in his History of the Navy of the United States, maintains that Augusta had her stores of supplies lightened before embarking on her mission and that the fire originated in some pressed hay which had been packed into the hull to render the vessel more resistant to shot. Other American accounts generally maintain that it was their fire rafts that caused the fire.

Record of any preparation for coordination of the land attack with naval support between Reynolds and von Donop are inconclusive. There was no possible way for the two distant commanders to communicate with each other during the siege. From the beginning it seemed that Reynolds had no way of knowing at what time von Donop would commence his assault. As nightfall approached it would have been reasonable for Reynolds to assume that von Donop's attack might not begin until the next morning.

At his court-martial a month later, on 26 November, presided over by Captain George Ourry aboard HMS Somerset off Billingsport, Reynolds testified that "I thought it my duty to comply with Admiral Richard Howe's instructions in giving every Assistance to the Hessians: I immediately hoisted the Topsails and sent an Officer to each of the other ships acquainting the Captains that my intention was to go as near the upper Cheveaux de frize as possible, in order to draw the fire of the Galleys from the Hessians, and I desired they would do the same, which they complied with…" Reynolds was acquitted of all charges attributable to the loss of Augusta. Shortly thereafter Reynolds returned to England aboard the transport Dutton, (Note: Not to be confused with HMS Dutton) entrusted with dispatches from Richard Howe. Given the delayed activity of the ships' progress trying to bypass the river obstacles by Billingsport, the order to proceed up river, when it finally came, while anticipated, still caught the squadron somewhat unprepared.

=== Other service ===
Reynolds' next command was over HMS Jupiter, bearing 50 guns, to which he was appointed in July 1778, shortly after her keel laying and completion. Jupiter departed from Portsmouth on 28 August to sail for Elsinore with the Saint Petersburg convoy. On 20 October, cruising off Cape Finisterre, sailing with the frigate HMS Medea, commanded by Captain James Montagu, Reynolds took to chase after the 64-gun French Navy ship of the line Triton, captained by Gaspard de Ligondès, initially thinking that she was an East Indiaman before ascertaining her real identity. After a five-hour afternoon chase a ferocious battle commenced in stormy weather at about 6 p.m. Within thirty minutes the Medea, engaging the Triton on her lee quarter while the Jupiter attacked from her windward side, was forced out of the action. Thereafter the difficulty of fighting in the darkness near the shore prevented Reynolds from concluding what he assumed would be a likely victory. During the two-hour engagement the Triton suffered casualties of thirteen men killed and thirty wounded, including her commander who had been obliged to leave the deck, while the Jupiter's casualties included three men killed and eleven wounded. The Triton put into A Coruña to make repairs while the two British vessels made for Lisbon to attend to their own repairs.

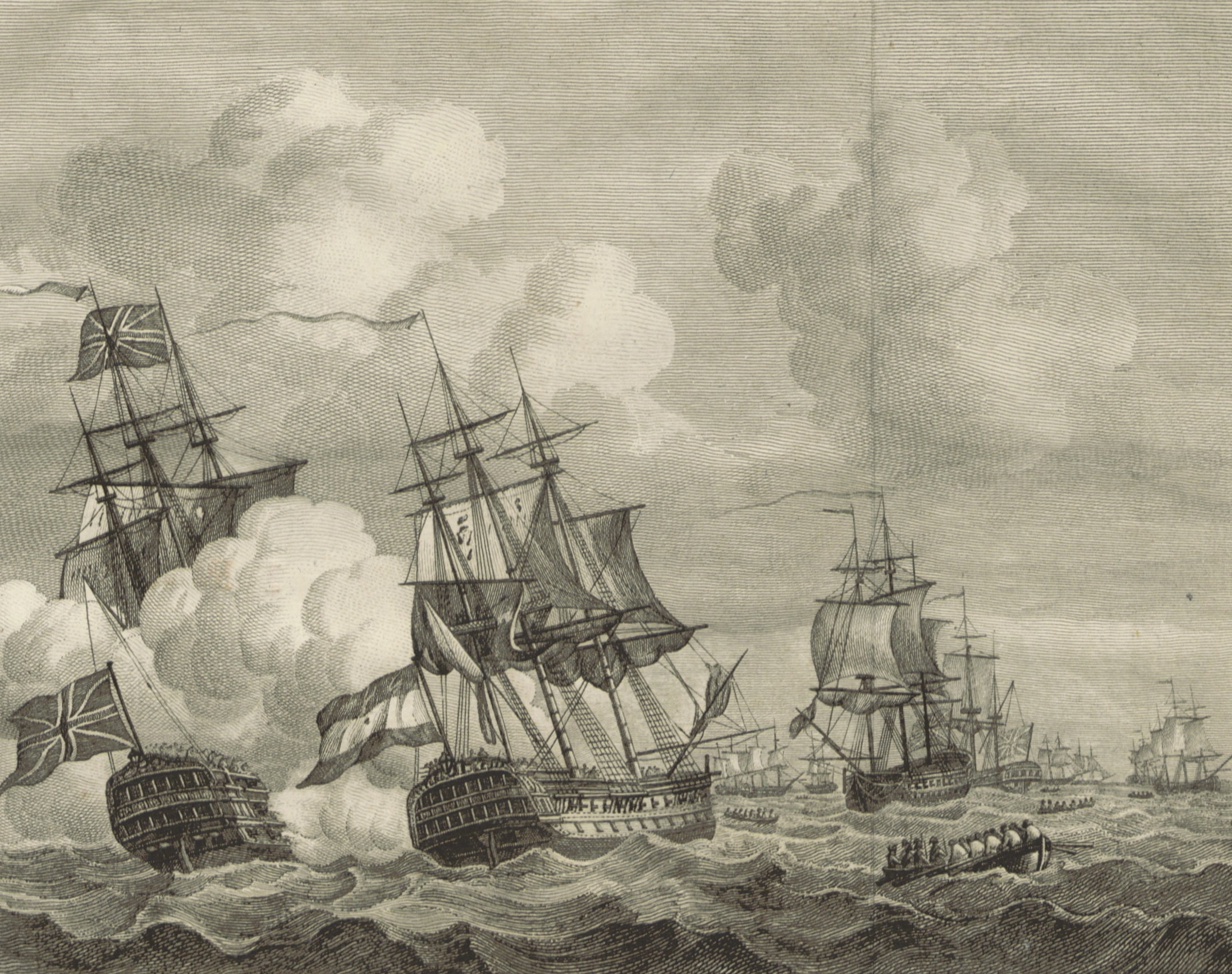
The action of 4 February 1781, at which Reynolds commanded the victorious British

On 20 September 1780, Reynolds assumed command of HMS Monarch, a ship of the line bearing 74 guns and sailed with Rear-Admiral Sir Samuel Hood's reinforcements headed for the West Indies in late October. He was present at the capture of Sint Eustatius on 3 February 1781, and was chosen by Admiral of the White Sir George Rodney to depart with the Monarch, HMS Panther and HMS Sybil, and pursue the 60-gun Dutch States Navy ship of the line Mars. In the action of 4 February 1781 Reynolds' squadron engaged Mars, forcing her to strike her colours and surrender after Schout-bij-nacht Willem Krul was killed. On 29 April, serving under Admiral Samuel Hood, Reynolds, still in command of Monarch, was present at the Battle of Fort Royal.

As commander of HMS Monarch, part of the fleet under commander Thomas Graves, Reynolds fought at the Battle of the Chesapeake in 1781. On 26 January 1782, Reynolds, commander of HMS Monarch, was present at the Battle of Saint Kitts. On 12 April 1782, Reynolds fought in the Battle of the Saintes.

On 1 April 1779, Reynolds departed Portsmouth with Jupiter and within a few hours came upon and assisted the British sloop HMS Delight, bearing 14 guns, commanded by Admiral John Leigh Douglas, while he was in the process of capturing the French privateer Jean Bart. Reynolds took custody of the prize and carried her into Plymouth so that the sloop could proceed on her Admiralty orders, and he then left the Devonshire port on 4 April to sail in the Bay of Biscay and observe the activities of the French fleet. Reynolds was commissioned as captain of a company of the British Volunteer Corps' Gloucestershire Volunteers on 22 August 1803. He died in 1808.

== Later life ==
On 9 September 1785, Reynolds was elected a Member of Parliament for Lancaster, Lancashire. On 11 September 1785, he succeeded his elder brother as Baron Ducie. Sometime thereafter he became Clerk of the Crown in County Palatine of Lancaster.

Ducie Island, in the Pacific Ocean, was named after him by Captain Edward Edwards of HMS Pandora, who had served under Ducie during his time in command of HMS Augusta.

== See also ==
- Tadeusz Kościuszko, designer and engineer of Fort Mercer
- Fort Billingsport
- List of American Revolutionary War battles
- List of nautical terms

== Bibliography ==
- Burke, John (1832). A General and Heraldic Dictionary of the Peerage and Baronetage of the British Empire. London: H. Colburn and R. Bentley. p. 361.
- Chartrand, René (2016). Forts of the American Revolution 1775–83. Osprey Publishing Ltd. ISBN 978-1-4728-1445-6.
- Clarke, James Stanier; Jones, Stephen; John, Jones, eds. (1799). The Naval Chronicle. Vol. III. London: J. Gold.
- Cokayne, George Edward (1916). Complete Peerage of England, Scotland, Ireland, Great Britain and the United Kingdom, Extant, Extinct, Or Dormant. Vol. III. The Saint Catherine Press. pp. 475–476. – Note: This second publication differs from the G. Bell & sons publication of 1890 where the Reynolds account is found in volume three on p. 178, and covered in fewer words.
- Cooper, James Fenimore (1848). History of the Navy of the United States of America. Cooperstown: Published by H. & E. Phinney.
- Dorwart, Jeffery M. (1998). Fort Mifflin of Philadelphia: An Illustrated History. University of Pennsylvania Press. ISBN 978-0-8122-1644-8.
- Doyle, James William Edmund (1886). The Official Baronage of England: Showing the Succession, Dignities, and Offices of Every Peerage. Vol. I. Longmans, Green.
- Fraser, Edward (1904). Famous Fighters of the Fleet: Glimpses Through the Cannon Smoke in the Days of the Old Navy. Kessinger Publishing.
- Hiscocks, Richard (2018). "Francis Reynolds-Moreton 3rd Lord Ducie". morethannelson.
- Leach, Josiah Granville (1902). "Commodore John Hazlewood, Commander of the Pennsylvania Navy in the Revolution". The Pennsylvania Magazine of History and Biography. 26 (1). The Pennsylvania Magazine of History and Biography, Vol. 26, No. 1 (1902), pp. 1–6 and The Historical Society of Pennsylvania: 1–6. JSTOR 20086007.
- Martin, David G. (1993). Philadelphia Campaign. Da Capo Press. ISBN 978-0-9382-8919-7.
- McGeorge, Wallace (1905). The Battle of Red Bank, resulting in the defeat of the Hessians and the destruction of the British frigate Augusta, Oct. 22 and 23, 1777. Camden, New Jersey, Sinnickson Chew, printers.
- McGuire, Thomas J. (2007). The Philadelphia Campaign: Germantown and the Roads to Valley Forge. Stackpole Books. ISBN 978-0-8117-4945-9.
- Miller, Nathan (2000). Broadsides. Wiley. ISBN 978-0-7858-2022-2.
- Mundy, Godfrey Basil (1830). The life and correspondence of the late Admiral Lord Rodney. London : J. Murray.
- Sparks, Jared, ed. (1853). Correspondence of the American revolution, being letters of eminent men to George Washington, from the time of his taking command of the army to the end of his presidency, Vol. II. Boston : Little, Brown and company. "Jared Sparks"
- Wallace, John William (1884). An Old Philadelphian, Colonel William Bradford: The Patriot Printer of 1776. Sketches of His Life. Sherman & Company, printers. ISBN 9780795007507.
- "The story of the Battle of Red Bank". Friends of Redbank. Friends of Red Bank Battlefield.
- Harrison, Cy, ed. (2010). "Lord Francis Reynolds (3rd Baron Ducie)". Three Decks, Cy Harrison.
- "HMS Monarch". The London Gazette. No. 15354. 15 April 1801.
- "The London Gazette". No. 11967. 3 April 1779.

Parliament of Great Britain
| Preceded by Wilson Gale-Braddyll; Abraham Rawlinson | Member of Parliament for Lancaster; 1784–1785; With: Abraham Rawlinson | Succeeded by Sir George Warren; Abraham Rawlinson |
Peerage of Great Britain
| Preceded by Thomas Moreton | Baron Ducie; 1785–1808 | Succeeded by Thomas Moreton |
