= Aruba leaf-toed gecko =

Conservation status
- Least Concern (IUCN 3.1)

Scientific classification
- Kingdom: Animalia
- Phylum: Chordata
- Class: Reptilia
- Order: Squamata
- Suborder: Gekkota
- Family: Phyllodactylidae
- Genus: Phyllodactylus
- Species: P. julieni

Binomial name
- Phyllodactylus julieni Cope, 1885

Species of lizard

The Aruba leaf-toed gecko (Phyllodactylus julieni) is a species of lizard in the family Phyllodactylidae. The species is endemic to Aruba in the Caribbean.

== Taxonomy ==
The Aruba leaf-toed gecko was first formally described in 1885 by the American zoologist and paleontologist Edward Drinker Cope, with its type locality given as Aruba. Cope classified this species in the genus Phyllodactylus, which was proposed in 1828 as a monospecific genus by John Edward Gray when he described Phyllodactylus pulcher from Barbados. This genus is the type genus of the family Phyllodactylidae, in the infraorder Gekkota.

== Etymology ==
The Aruba leaf-toed gecko is a member of the genus Phyllodactylus, this name being a combination of the Greek words phyllon, which means "leaf", and daktylos, meaning "finger", a reference to the leaf-shaped fingers characteristic of these geckos. The specific name, julieni, is in honor of American geologist Alexis Anastay Julien.

== Description ==
The Aruba leaf-toed gecko is a fawn or pale brown gecko with 6 or 7 transverse brownish bands along the back and between 10 and 12 on the tail. The lips are typically a mottled brown and cream.

== Distribution and habitat ==
The Aruba leaf-tailed gecko is endemic to Aruba, a constituent island country within the Kingdom of the Netherlands, in the southern Caribbean Sea. The preferred natural habitat of P. julieni is shrubland. It may be being competitively excluded from built up areas of Aruba by the invavsive Tropical house gecko (Hemidactylus mabouia), but this species has not penetrated more natural habitats on the island.

== Biology ==
The Aruba leaf-toed gecko is a terrestrial and nocturnal lizard. It is an oviparous breeder.
