= Alexis A. Julien =

American geologist

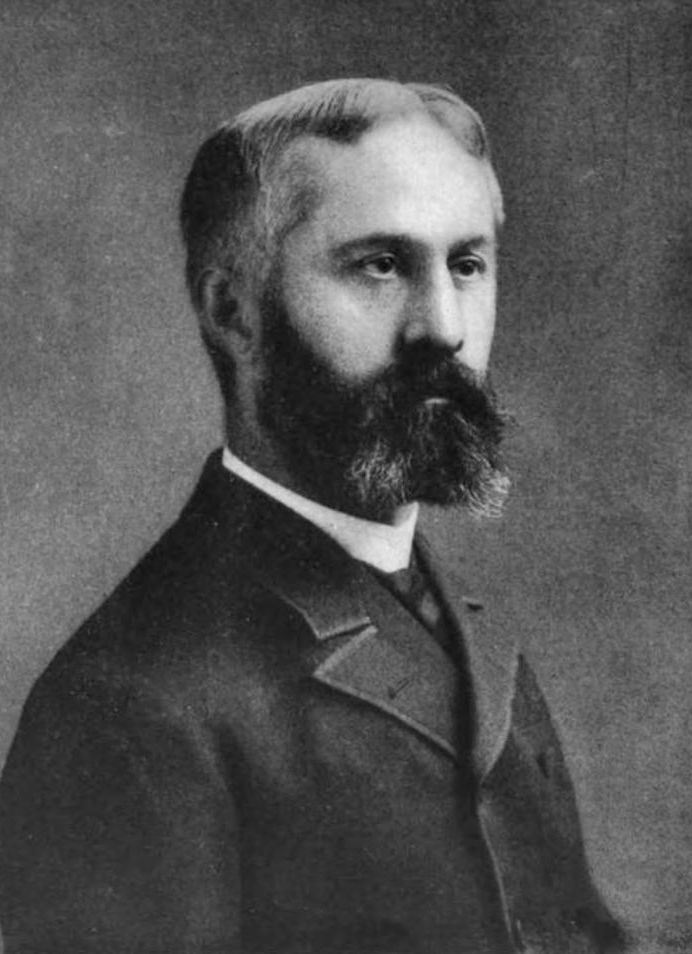
- Born: Alexis Anastay Julien; February 13, 1840; New York, New York
- Died: May 7, 1919 (aged 79); South Harwich, Massachusetts
- Education: Union College
- Occupation: Geologist
- Spouse: Annie Walker Nevius (m. 1882)

Signature
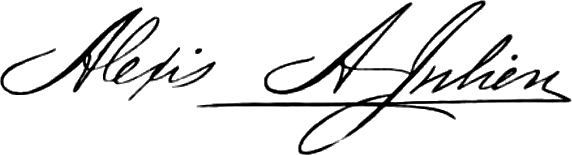

Alexis Anastay Julien (February 13, 1840 – May 7, 1919) was an American geologist who taught at Columbia University's School of Mines for many years.

== Biography ==
Julien was born in New York City on February 13, 1840. He graduated from Union College in 1859, but continued as a student in the chemical laboratory a year longer. In 1860 he went to the guano island of Sombrero as resident chemist, and continued there until 1864, also making studies of its geology and natural history, especially of its birds and land shells. He sent his collections to the Smithsonian Institution, for which he also made meteorological observations, this island being the most southerly under its direction. In 1862 he made a geological survey of the islets around St. Bartholomew for the Swedish government, receiving in recognition of his services a gold medal from the king of Sweden.

Soon after the establishment of the Columbia School of Mines he became the assistant in charge of the quantitative laboratory, and in 1885 he was appointed instructor in charge of the department of microscopy and biology in the same institution. He was connected with the Michigan Geological Survey in 1872, making a special study of the crystalline rocks and ores of the Marquette district, and his lithological reports appear in the published volumes of the survey. In 1875, he began the study of the petrography of North Carolina for the North Carolina Geological Survey, and served for three successive summers in the field. He visited the islands of Bonaire, Curaçao and Aruba in the West Indies (1881–1882), and investigated the guano deposits and geology of these islands. The degree of Ph.D. was conferred on him in 1881 by the New York University.

He married Annie Walker Nevius in 1882.

He was a member of scientific societies, and was vice president of the New York Academy of Sciences in 1884. Julien was one of the founders of the New York Microscopical Society in 1880, and in 1883 was one of the originators of the Society of Naturalists of the Eastern United States. He retired from the Columbia School of Mines in 1907.

Julien died at his home in South Harwich, Massachusetts on May 7, 1919.

== Legacy ==
Julien is commemorated in the scientific name of a species of Caribbean lizard, Phyllodactylus julieni.

== Selected works ==
He made numerous contributions to scientific literature. Among his papers were:

- "On the Geological Action of the Humus Acids" (1879)
- "On Spodumene and its Alterations" (1879)
- "Building-Stones of New York City and Environs" (U. S. census reports, 1880)
- "The Durability of Building-Stones in New York City and Vicinity" (U. S. census reports, 1880)
- "The Genesis of the Crystalline Iron-Ores" (1882)
- "Notice on the Microscopical Examination of a Series of Ocean, Lake, River, and Desert Sands" (1884)
- "On the Variation of Decomposition in the Iron Pyrites, its Cause, and its Relation to Density" (1886)
