= Sombrero Lighthouse =

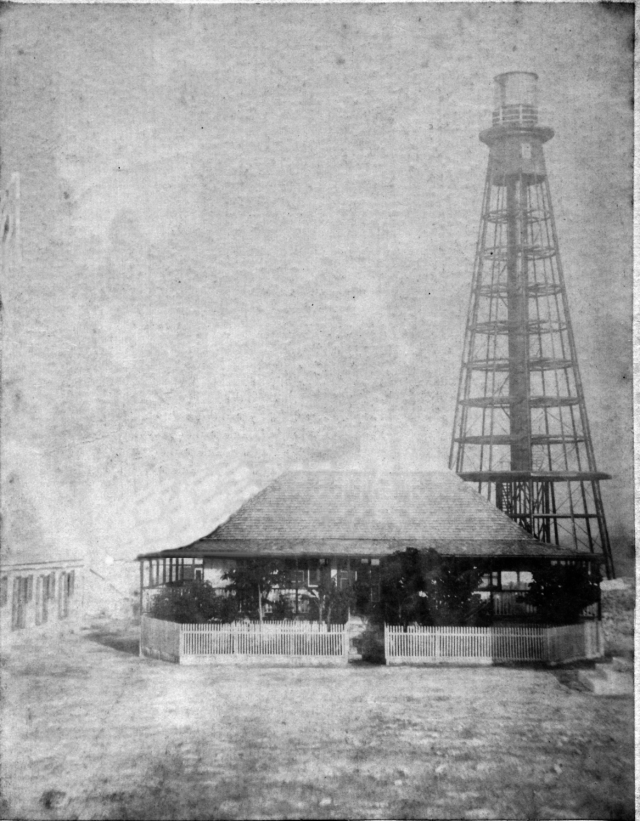
- Location: Anguilla, Anguilla
- Coordinates: 18°35′11.7″N 63°25′35.4″W

Tower
- Constructed: 1868 (first); 1962 (second)
- Foundation: concrete base
- Construction: concrete tower
- Height: 15 metres (49 ft) (current); 28 metres (92 ft) (second)
- Shape: three-stage cylindrical tower with beacon (current)
- Markings: white tower (current)
- Power source: solar power
- Operator: Government of Anguilla

Light
- First lit: 2001 (current)
- Focal height: 28 metres (92 ft) (current)
- Range: 17 nautical miles (31 km; 20 mi)
- Characteristic: Fl W 10s.

Sombrero Lighthouse is a lighthouse that marks the Anegada Passage, which is the route from Europe into the Caribbean. The lighthouse is located near the centre of Sombrero island, and reaches a height of almost 51 metres (167 ft) above sea level.

== History ==
The first lighthouse, built by the American company that extracted the phosphate on the island, came into operation 1 January 1868. It consisted of a circular pyramidal skeletal tower, on concrete base, with balcony and lantern; by 1893 it was managed by the British Board of Trade. In 1931, the old light system was changed and improved to 200,000 candle power and the tower received its first major repair when the basement was encased in concrete.

In 1960 Hurricane Donna damaged the lighthouse; a new one replaced it 20 July 1962. The second light was a square pyramidal skeletal tower 28 metres (92 ft) high with central cylinder mounted on a concrete base. The lighthouses were staffed from 1868 to 2001.

In 2001 Trinity House donated and installed the current automated tower, which is a 15 metres (49 ft) cylindrical tower painted white with balcony and no lantern. The light is positioned at 28 metres (92 ft) above sea level and emits one white flash in a 10 seconds period visible up to a distance of 17 nautical miles (31 km; 20 mi). Since 1 December 2001 Anguilla's Department of Fisheries and Marine Resources has been responsible for the maintenance of the navigational aids.

== See also ==
- List of lighthouses in Anguilla
- Sombrero, Anguilla
