= Anguillita =

Island in Anguilla

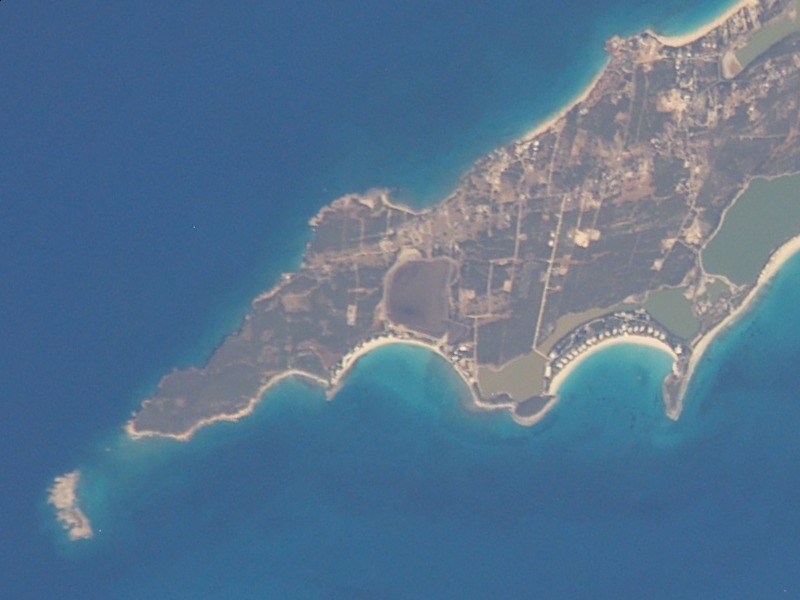
- Satellite image of Anguillita to the west of the main island of Anguilla

- Location of Anguillita

Geography
- Location: Atlantic Ocean
- Coordinates: 18°09′29.3″N 63°10′32.6″W
- Archipelago: Antilles

Administration
- United Kingdom
- British Overseas Territory: Anguilla

Additional information
- Time zone: AST (UTC-4)
- ISO code: AI
- Anguillita Lighthouse
- Foundation: concrete base
- Construction: aluminium skeletal tower
- Height: 8 m (26 ft)
- Shape: square prism skeletal tower with beacon
- Power source: solar power
- Focal height: 15 m (49 ft)
- Range: 5 nmi (9.3 km; 5.8 mi)
- Characteristic: Fl(2) W 16s

Anguillita is a small, uninhabited rocky island off the western tip of, and part of the territory of Anguilla, located in the Caribbean. It is the dependency's southernmost point.

== Characteristics ==
Unlike Scrub Island, a larger island off the Eastern Tip and which has two excellent beaches, Anguillita is rarely even seen, since the western tip is virtually inaccessible by foot. As such it is rarely visited by tourists, though it is accessible by sea kayak.

Anguillita offers opportunities for scuba divers, and good snorkelling conditions can be found off its rugged coast. Species such as barracudas, stingrays, and turtles can be seen in its waters. There are three ledged mini-walls at a depth of some 5–20 metres, and numerous small underwater caves.

== See also ==
- List of lighthouses in Anguilla
