= Sombrero, Anguilla =

Island of Anguilla

Sombrero
- Location of Sombrero within Anguilla

- Location within Lesser Antilles Location within the Caribbean

Geography
- Location: Atlantic Ocean
- Coordinates: 18°35′21″N 63°25′31″W
- Archipelago: Antilles

Administration
- United Kingdom
- British Overseas Territory: Anguilla

Additional information
- Time zone: AST (UTC-4)
- ISO code: AI

Ramsar Wetland
- Official name: Sombrero Island Nature Reserve Marine Park
- Designated: 22 May 2018
- Reference no.: 2354

Sombrero, also known as Hat Island, is part of the British Overseas Territory of Anguilla and is the northernmost island of the Lesser Antilles. (Note: There is an occasional mention in the late 19th century of a "Sambrera" in the West Indies. One news account refers to Sambrera as a desert island. A brig had struck the island and was totally lost, though the 15 passengers and crew were saved. The ship Richmond, Wm. Cutter, master, rescued them on 8 August 1801. Sambrera could well be Sombrero.) It lies 54 km (34 mi) north-west of Anguilla across the Dog and Prickly Pear Passage. The distance to Dog Island, the next nearest island of Anguilla, is 38 kilometres (24 miles).

Sombrero is 1.67 kilometres (1,826.33 yards) long north–south, and 0.38 km (415.57 yd) wide. The land area is 0.38 km^{2} (93.90 acres). Originally, when viewed from the sea, the island had the shape of a sombrero hat, but guano-mining operations have left the island with precipitous sides and a relatively flat top that is 12 m (39 ft) above sea level. The surface of the island is rough, and vegetation is sparse.

The guano-mining operation yielded some 3000 tons of phosphate a year by 1870. By 1890, the phosphate reserves had been exhausted.

== History ==
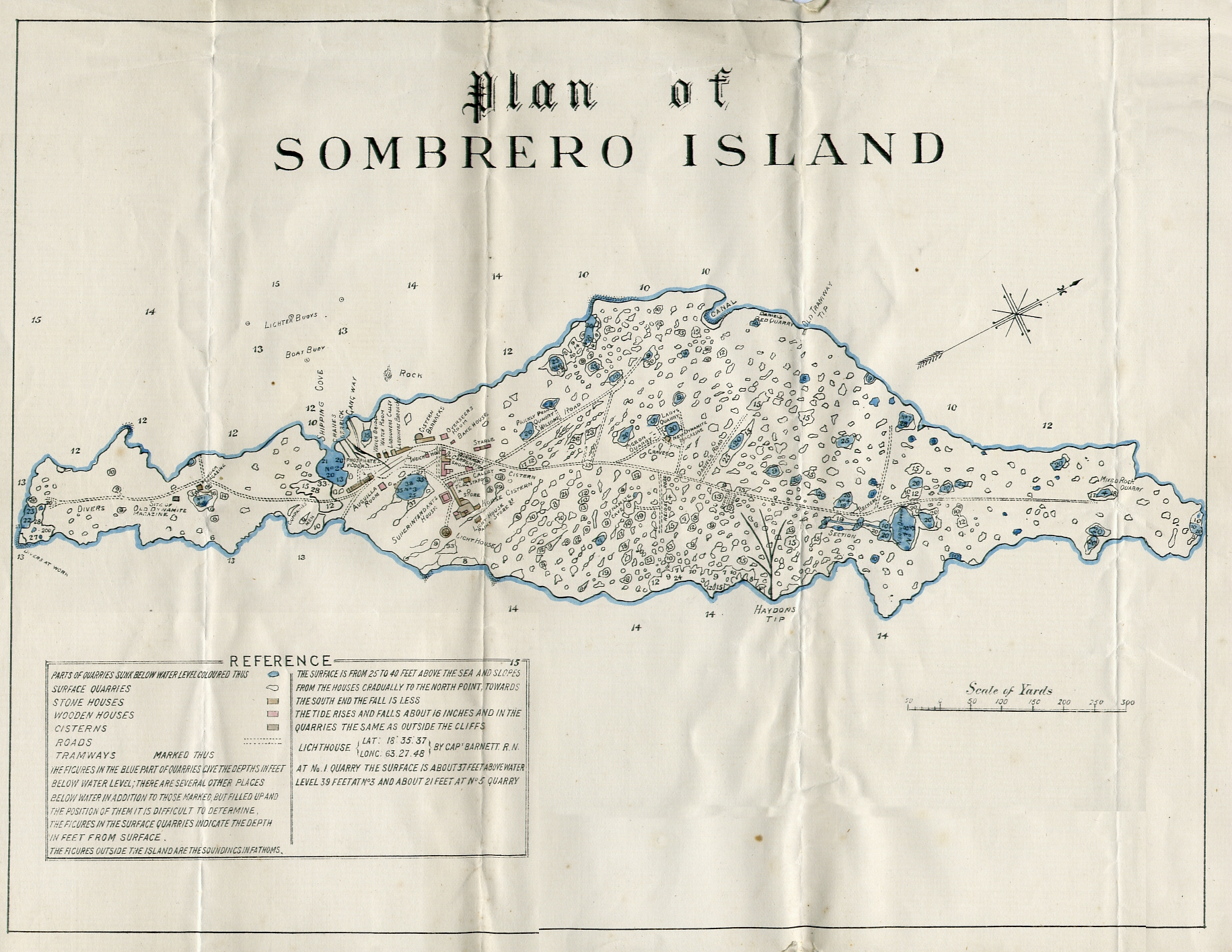
Plan of Sombrero in about 1880 showing mining operations

As a result of the Treaty of Utrecht in 1714, Sombrero passed into the hands of the British. Captain Warwick Lake of Recruit marooned an impressed seaman, Robert Jeffrey, there on 13 December 1807. As it turned out, Jeffrey survived. A passing American vessel, the schooner Adams from Marblehead, Massachusetts, had rescued him. Still, a court-martial dismissed Lake from the Royal Navy.

In 1814, and again in 1825, a British geologist surveyed the island and found that it abounded in guano and reported this to the British government.

In 1856 the Americans claimed the island, and in a very short period of time quarried 100,000 tons of phosphate that served as fertiliser for the exhausted lands of the Southern States. Uniquely, an important insurrection occurred when West Indian black workers revolted against the "slavery proclivities" of a white American superintendent vis-à-vis wage-earning free men. Four of the 200 workers "fatally injured" Superintendent Snow and commandeered the island and company money and stores.

The British later intervened and demanded compensation from the United States for the occupation. The conflicting claims to the island were settled in Britain's favour in 1867.

Sombrero, lying in the route of shipping from Britain to South and Central America, lay in an area with many hazards and in 1848 the Admiralty was asked to install a light on it. On 30 June 1859, the Royal Mail Steam Packet Company's ship Paramatta was wrecked on her maiden voyage on Horseshoe Reef, which resulted in another request to the Admiralty. The lighthouse was then built and first exhibited its light on the evening of 1 January 1868.

Coincidentally, Paramatta and the Lighthouse built following her demise were both constructed by the same shipyard, the Thames Ironworks and Shipbuilding Company, on the banks of the River Lea in Blackwall, London. Paramatta was the last ship launched from their Middlesex bank, while the lighthouse was built on the Essex side, the yard occupying premises on either side of the river. In 1871, the lease of the island was sold for £55,000 and then sold again for £110,000 to the New Sombrero Phosphate Company, which led to litigation in Erlanger v. New Sombrero Phosphate Co (1878) 3 App Cas 1218.

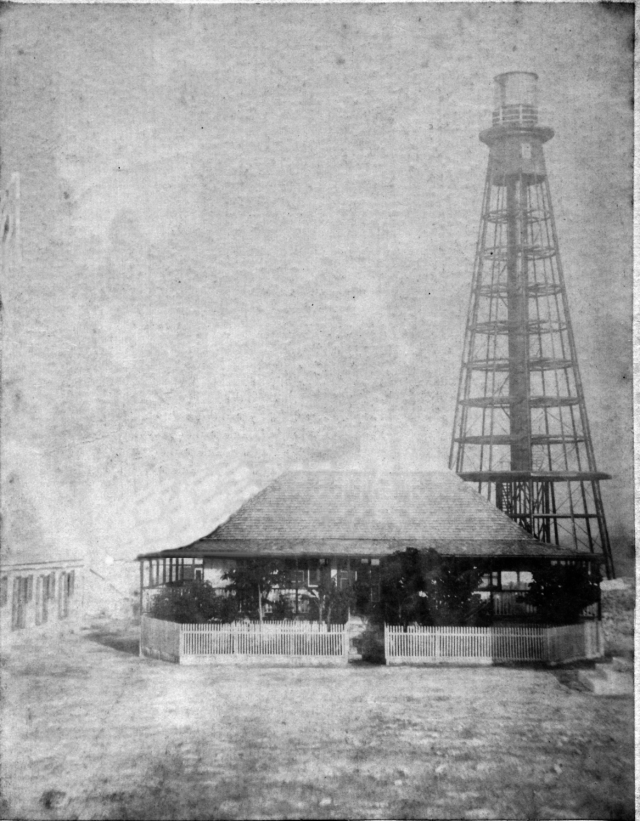
The superintendent of Sombrero's house in about 1880

From the early 1870s until 1885, a Cornish mining engineer, Thomas Corfield, was Superintendent of Sombrero. His duties included organising the transport of the guano to a spot which was convenient for loading the lighters to take the guano to the ships lying off the island, overseeing the construction of derricks and engine houses, and arranging for the laying of the tram lines for the wagons, which were loaded at the quarries. The guano was just piled in dumps near the engine houses and derricks. There was no semblance of a port and no beach.

The workers, who were black, were recruited from various islands and lived in wooden huts during their term of service. A Mr. Nesbit, a merchant at Philipsburg, Sint Maarten, provided the stores and provisions. The company's schooner Logos took the labourers to and from their homes on the other islands, and brought the supplies.

The superintendent's house was a wooden bungalow with a wide veranda around the house. He used to live there with his family, except near the hurricane season. The superintendent's house was near the middle of the island and around it were grouped other wooden buildings, and the quarters of the technicians, store keepers, and lighthouse keepers. On the side opposite to the main buildings was a small building for the superintendent.

In 1890, the phosphate works on the island were abandoned and by 1893 the lighthouse had come under the authority of the British Board of Trade, later the Department of Transport. Trinity House was responsible for the administration of the light. In 1931, the old light system was changed and improved to 200,000 candle power and the tower received its first major repair when the basement was encased in concrete.

On 20 July 1962, after the destruction caused by Hurricane Donna in 1960, the present lighthouse was put into operation. The old tower was demolished on 28 July 1962. The lighthouse is located near the centre of the island, and reaches a height of almost 166 feet (51 m) above sea level. It alerts ships passing from the Atlantic Ocean to the Caribbean Sea through the Anegada Passage. Full responsibility for the light passed from Trinity House to the Anguillan government on 1 December 2001.

== Population ==
Until recently the only inhabitants were the staff of the lighthouse, but the light was automated in 2002, and now the island is uninhabited. The only visitors are the occasional fishermen, biologists engaged in fieldwork, and the occasional scuba group visiting the island for its interesting dive sites and post-apocalyptic surface.

== Wildlife ==
The island is noted for the endemic Sombrero ameiva, a widespread and easily seen lizard species on the island. A recently discovered dwarf gecko, Sphaerodactylus, may be endemic and has been tentatively named the Sombrero dwarf gecko. The Anguilla Bank anole too inhabits the island. This island also has a unique Lasioglossum bee.

The surrounding waters are feeding areas for hawksbill turtles. During the late Pleistocene, the island was inhabited by a now-extinct giant tortoise, Chelonoidis sombrerensis.

Sombrero has been identified as an Important Bird Area by BirdLife International because of its breeding seabirds. The island has also been designated as a protected Ramsar site since 2018. It supports internationally important numbers of:

- Masked boobies (Sula dactylatra): 27 pairs (54 + birds, 4% of Caribbean population) 2002
- Brown boobies (Sula leucogaster): 386 pairs (772 + birds, 5% of Caribbean population) 1999
- Bridled terns (Sterna anaethetus): 270 pairs (540 birds, 4% of Caribbean population) 1998
- Brown noddies (Anous stolidus): 700 pairs (1400 birds, 5% of Caribbean population) 1998
- Sooty terns (Onychoprion fuscata)

In mid-June 2021 Anguilla National Trust (ANT) launched a programme to rid Sombrero Island of invasive mice.

== See also ==
- Alexis A. Julien (1840–1919), American geologist, served as Sombrero resident chemist
- Sombrero Lighthouse

== Notes, citations, and references ==
Notes

Citations

References

- Lazell, J. (1964) "The reptiles of Sombrero, West Indies". Copeia: 716–718.
