= African Americans in the Revolutionary War =

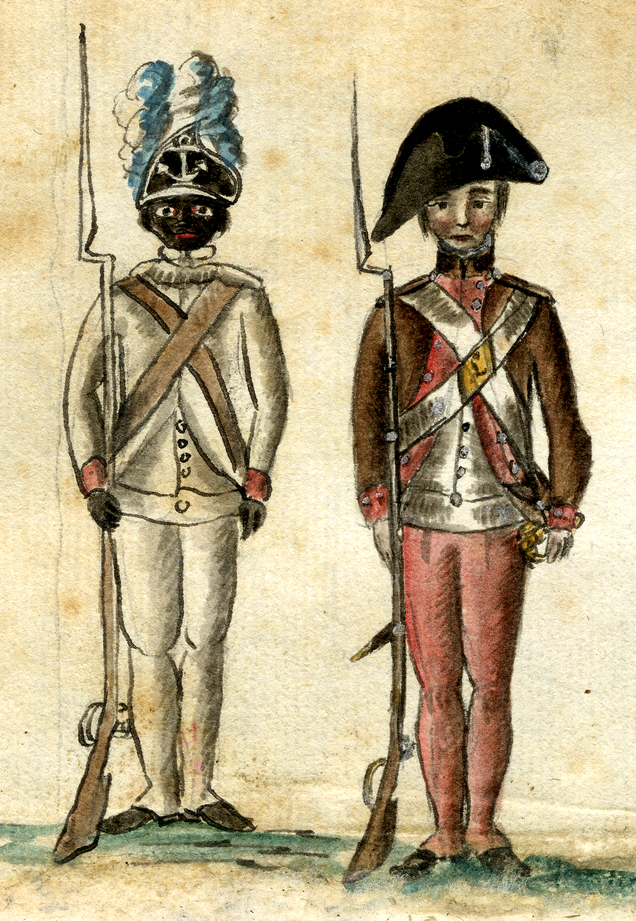
Continental soldiers at Yorktown; on the left, an African-American soldier of the 1st Rhode Island Regiment.

African Americans fought on both sides the American Revolution, the Patriot cause for independence as well as the Loyalist cause of stable government. It is estimated that 20,000 African Americans joined the British cause, which promised freedom to enslaved people, as Black Loyalists. About half that number, an estimated 9,000 African Americans, became Black Patriots.

Between 220,000 and 250,000 soldiers and militia served the American cause in total, suggesting that Black soldiers made up approximately four percent of the Patriots' numbers. Of the 9,000 Black soldiers, 5,000 were combat-dedicated troops. The average length of time in service for an African American soldier during the war was four and a half years (due to many serving for the whole eight-year duration), which was eight times longer than the average period for white soldiers. Meaning that while they were only four percent of the manpower base, they comprised around a quarter of the Patriots' strength in terms of man-hours, though this includes supportive roles.

About 20,000 people escaped slavery, joined, and fought for the British army. Much of this number was seen after Dunmore's Proclamation, and subsequently the Philipsburg Proclamation issued by Sir Henry Clinton. Though between only 800–2,000 people who were enslaved reached Dunmore himself, the publication of both proclamations provided incentive for nearly 100,000 enslaved people across the American Colonies to escape, lured by the promise of freedom.

In March 1770, Black Bostonian Crispus Attucks was part of the large crowd taunting British soldiers and was one of the number they shot in the incident Patriots called the Boston Massacre. He is considered an iconic martyr of Patriots.

== African American Patriots ==
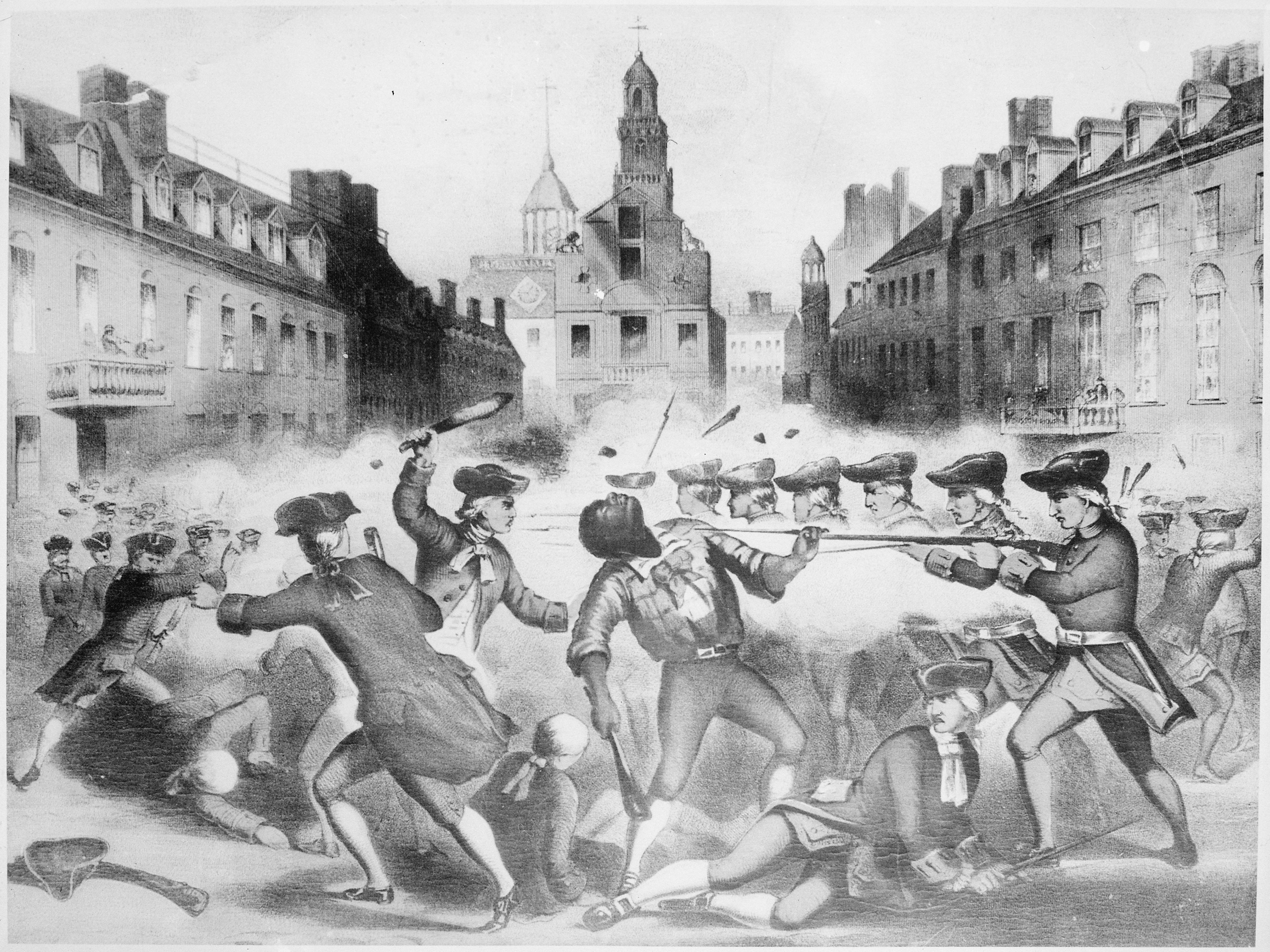
Engraving of Crispus Attucks being shot during the Boston Massacre. (John Bufford after William L. Champey, c. 1856)

Prior to the revolution, many free African Americans supported the anti-British cause, most famously Crispus Attucks, believed to be the first person killed at the Boston Massacre. At the time of the American Revolution, some Black men had already enlisted as minutemen. Both free and enslaved Africans had served in private militias, especially in the North, defending their villages against attacks by Native Americans. In March 1775, the Continental Congress assigned units of the Massachusetts militia as Minutemen. They were under orders to become activated if the British troops in Boston took the offensive. Peter Salem, who had been freed by his owner to join the Framingham militia, was one of the Black men in the military. He served for nearly five years. In the Revolutionary War, slave owners often let the people they enslaved to enlist in the war with promises of freedom, but many were put back into slavery after the conclusion of the war.

Some slaves served as a substitute soldier for their master. One such African American soldier was Ishmael Titus from Rowan County, North Carolina, who fought in the battles of Kings Mountain and Guilford Court House. He was granted his freedom after the war and died at the age of 110.

In April 1775, at Lexington and Concord, Black men responded to the call and fought with Patriot forces. Prince Estabrook was wounded some time during the fighting on 19 April, probably at Lexington. The Battle of Bunker Hill also had African-American soldiers fighting along with white Patriots, such as Peter Salem; Salem Poor, Barzillai Lew, Blaney Grusha, Titus Coburn, Alexander Ames, Cato Howe, and Seymour Burr. Many African Americans, both enslaved and free, wanted to join with the Patriots. They believed that they would achieve freedom or expand their civil rights. In addition to the role of soldier, Black men also served as guides, messengers, and spies.

On April 26, 1777, during Tyron's raid on Danbury Connecticut, a slave named Adams, in an act of reckless daring, was killed when firing upon the British.

American states had to meet quotas of troops for the new Continental Army, and New England regiments recruited Black enslaved people by promising freedom to those who served in the Continental Army. During the course of the war, about one-fifth of the men in the northern army were Black. At the Siege of Yorktown in 1781, Baron Closen, a German officer in the French Royal Deux-Ponts Regiment, estimated about one-quarter of the American army to be Black men.

Another famous Black patriot was Jack Peterson of Westchester whose quick thinking helped repel British forces in Croton, New York. Peterson's actions threw Benedict Arnold's treasonous plans into disarray and led to the capture of Major Andre.

== African American Loyalists ==
Though not counted as "Soldiers," thousands of African American slaves proved to be a great service to the continental army. The majority served as laborers who contributed in shaping military operations.

== African American sailors ==
Because of manpower shortages at sea, both the Continental Navy and Royal Navy signed African Americans into their navies. Even southern colonies, which worried about putting guns into the hands of enslaved people for the army, had no qualms about using Black men to pilot vessels and to handle the ammunition on ships. In state navies, some African Americans served as captains: South Carolina had significant numbers of Black captains. Some African Americans had been captured from the Royal Navy and used by the Patriots on their vessels.

== African American Spies ==
African Americans served an underlying importance throughout the American Revolution. Though rare, some acted as spies, messengers, or guides for the continental army. Most famous of these is James Armistead Lafayette an enslaved man from New Kent County, Virginia. With his masters permission, he served with the mission to relieve Virginians of the constant harassment they faced by the British. Lafayette hovered around various British camps to receive information that he would give to the continental army.

== Patriot resistance to using African Americans ==
Some revolutionary leaders began to be fearful of using Black men in the armed forces. They were afraid that enslaved people who were armed would cause slave rebellions. Slave owners became concerned that military service would eventually free their people.

In May 1775, the Massachusetts Committee of Safety enrolled enslaved people in the armies of the colony. The action was adopted by the Continental Congress when they took over the Patriot Army. But Horatio Gates in July 1775 issued an order to recruiters, ordering them not to enroll "any deserter from the Ministerial army, nor any stroller, negro or vagabond. . ." in the Continental Army. Most Black men were integrated into existing military units, but some segregated units were formed.

In 1779, American Major General Philip Schuyler complained to fellow major general William Heath about the quality of the reinforcements sent to him during the Saratoga campaign, writing that "one third of the few that have been sent are boys, aged men and negroes, who disgrace our arms... Is it consistent with the Sons of Freedom to trust their all to be defended by slaves?"

== African American Loyalists in British military service ==
In 1779, Sir Henry Clinton issued the Philipsburg Proclamation, which stipulated that all enslaved people, regardless of age or gender owned by Patriots would be accepted at British lines. This greatly increased the number of enslaved African Americans who fled to British lines, and many regiments were formed during this period. The largest regiment made up of escaped African Americas was the Black Company of Pioneers, a pioneer unit. This regiment was placed in a support role, with orders to "attend the scavangers, assist in cleaning the streets & removing all newsiances being thrown into the streets" when they were stationed in Philadelphia. A smaller unit of 24 escaped slaves fought under the command of Colonel Tye, raiding Patriot settlements in New Jersey.

In Savannah, Augusta, and Charleston, when threatened by Patriot forces, the British filled gaps in their troops with African Americans. In October 1779, about 200 Black Loyalist soldiers assisted the British in successfully defending Savannah against a joint French and American Patriot attack.

In total, historians estimate that approximately 20,000 African Americans joined the British during the Revolutionary War, while only 5,000 African-Americans served in the Continental Army.

== Somerset vs. Stewart ==
Despite Britain's utilization of African American slaves in the Revolutionary War, a monumental court decision would quickly put in motion efforts to end slavery in Britain itself, though Britain did not ban the international slave trade in its Empire until 1807, the same year that then-President Thomas Jefferson and the U.S. Congress passed a law banning the international slave trade in the U.S. A slave trader named Charles Stewart purchased James Somerset, a slave who had been brought to America during the middle passage. Somerset ran away from Stewart's home on October 1, 1771, but was caught on November 26, would face trial on December 9, and the case would finally be decided on June 22, 1772. Somerset's defense exposed the fact that the laws of England do not affirm the right to possess slaves as property. At the end of the case, Lord Mansfield, the overseeing judge, ordered Somerset be set free. This landmark case would release some 14,000 British slaves from slavery. This decision immediately led to a massive rise in anti-slavery activism in Britain, and was a catalyst to the end of slave practices in Britain and among the British colonists. This in-turn provoked some slaveholders among the colonists, and was a contributor to the increasing tensions between these colonists and the British. The fear of losing the ability to own slaves was a minor motivator behind the revolt for the colonists since the Somerset decision threatened the slave practices in the colonies because they were bound by British law. The Somerset decision is also a major precursor to Dunmore's proclamation. Dunmore offered freedom to African American slaves in exchange for service in the British army during the revolution as the Somerset decision had begun to normalize the freedom of African slaves in Britain.

== Dunmore's Proclamation ==
Lord Dunmore, the royal governor of Virginia, was determined to maintain British rule in the colonies and promised to free those enslaved men of rebel owners who fought for him. On November 7, 1775, he issued Dunmore's Proclamation: "I do hereby further declare all indented servants, Negroes, or others, (appertaining to Rebels,) free, that are able and willing to bear arms, they joining His Majesty's Troops." By December 1775 the British army had 300 enslaved men wearing a military uniform. Sewn-on the breast of the uniform was the inscription "Liberty to Slaves". These enslaved men were designated as "Lord Dunmore's Ethiopian Regiment."

=== Patriot military response to Dunmore's Proclamation ===
Dunmore's proclamation angered the colonists, as they turned many African American slaves against them, serving as another contributor to the spark of the revolution. The opposition to the proclamation is directly referenced in the United States Declaration of Independence. The support of African American slaves would become an essential element to the Revolutionary Army and the British Army, and it would become a competition between both sides to enlist as many African American Slaves as possible.

Dunmore's Black soldiers aroused fear among some Patriots. The Ethiopian unit was used most frequently in the South, where the African population was oppressed to the breaking point. As a response to expressions of fear posed by armed Black men, in December 1775, Washington wrote a letter to Colonel Henry Lee III, stating that success in the war would come to whatever side could arm Black men the fastest; therefore, he suggested policy to execute any of the enslaved who would attempt to gain freedom by joining the British effort. Washington issued orders to the recruiters to reenlist the free Black men who had already served in the army; he worried that some of these soldiers might cross over to the British side.

Congress in 1776 agreed with Washington and authorized re-enlistment of free Black men who had already served. Patriots in South Carolina and Georgia resisted enlisting enslaved men as armed soldiers. African Americans from northern units were generally assigned to fight in southern battles. In some Southern states, southern Black enslaved men substituted for their masters in Patriot service.

== Black Regiment of Rhode Island ==
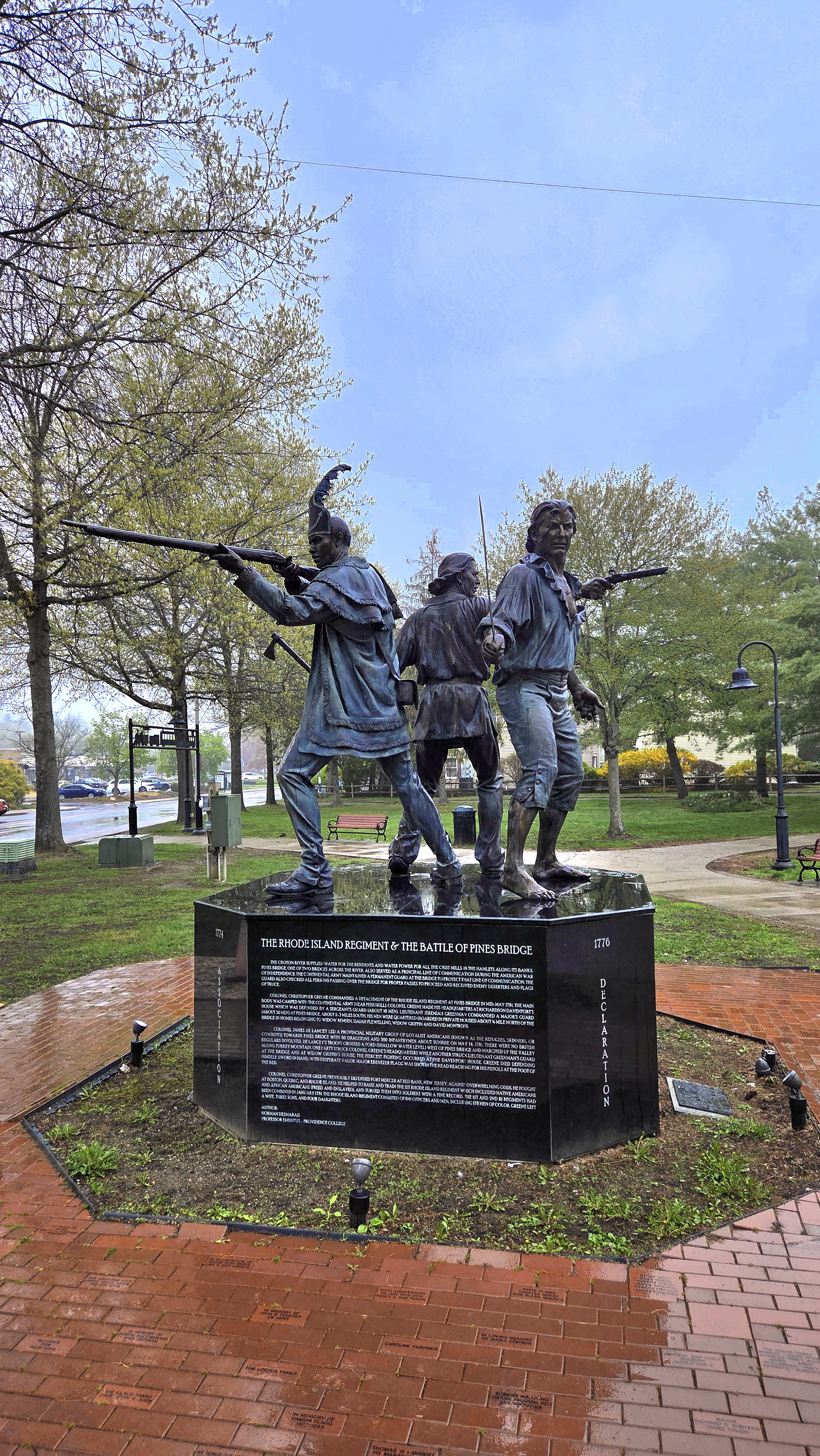
Pines Bridge Monument in Yorktown Heights

In 1778, Rhode Island was having trouble recruiting enough white men to meet the troop quotas set by the Continental Congress. The Rhode Island Assembly decided to adopt a suggestion by General Varnum and enlist enslaved men in 1st Rhode Island Regiment. Varnum had raised the idea in a letter to George Washington, who forwarded the letter to the governor of Rhode Island. On February 14, 1778, the Rhode Island Assembly voted to allow the enlistment of "every able-bodied negro, mulatto, or Indian man slave" who chose to do so, and that "every slave so enlisting shall, upon his passing muster before Colonel Christopher Greene, be immediately discharged from the service of his master or mistress, and be absolutely free...." The former owners of those slaves who'd enlisted, were to be compensated by the Assembly in an amount equal to the market value of the man who had been enslaved.

A total of 88 men who had been enslaved enlisted in the regiment over the next four months, joined by some free Black men and local Native Americans. The regiment eventually totaled about 225 men; probably fewer than 140 were Black men. The 1st Rhode Island Regiment became the only regiment of the Continental Army to have segregated companies of Black soldiers.

Under Colonel Greene, the regiment fought in the Battle of Rhode Island in August 1778. The regiment played a fairly minor but still-praised role in the battle. Its casualties were three killed, nine wounded, and eleven missing. It also fought in the Battle of Red Bank in New Jersey on October 22, 1777. There is a historical marker at the Red Bank Battlefield that tells the story of the African Americans who served with the regiment.

Like most of the Continental Army, the regiment saw little action over the next few years, as the focus of the war had shifted to the south. In 1781, Greene and several of his Black soldiers were killed in a skirmish with Loyalists known as the Battle of Pine's Bridge. Greene's body was mutilated by the Loyalists, apparently as punishment for having led Black soldiers against them. (There is an eyewitness account of the desire for revenge expressed by Captain Gilbert Totten, one of De Lancey's Cowboys, after he had been briefly detained near Pine's Bridge several weeks before the battle and placed under a guard of Black soldiers.) Many of the Black men in his unit were also killed. A Monument to the First Rhode Island Regiment memorializing the bravery of the Black soldiers that fought and died with Greene was erected in 1982 at the Crompond Presbyterian Burying Ground in Yorktown Heights, New York. In the center of Yorktown Heights, the Pines Bridge Monument, dedicated in 2018, depicts Col. Christopher Greene and two of his soldiers—an African American and a Native American.

== Fate of Black Loyalists ==
On July 21, 1781, as the final British ship left Savannah, more than 5,000 enslaved African Americans were transported with their Loyalist masters for Jamaica or St. Augustine. About 300 Black people in Savannah did not evacuate, fearing that they would be re-enslaved. They established a colony in the swamps of the Savannah River. By 1786, many were back in bondage.

So many African Americans fled to the British Army under Lord Cornwallis, that he wrote they caused "a most serious distress to us." By liberating slaves of revolting colonists, Cornwallis hindered the southern economy. These refugees contributed significantly to the British, however, as soldiers, laborers, and guides in the Southern Campaign. Cornwallis declined to return slaves who served his forces unless "they are willing to go with" the owners who claimed them. Following the Siege of Yorktown, however, General Washington issued an order for all "Negroes or Molattoes" fighting for the British to be held until they could be returned to their former owners.

The British evacuation of Charleston in December 1782 included many Loyalists and more than 5,000 Black men. More than half of these were enslaved by the Loyalists; they were taken by their masters for resettlement in the West Indies, where the Loyalists started or bought plantations. The British also settled freed African Americans in Jamaica and other West Indian islands, eventually granting them land. Another 500 enslaved people were taken alongside their Loyalist masters to East Florida, which remained under British control.

The British promised freedom to enslaved people who left their Patriot masters to side with the British. In New York City, which the British occupied, thousands of refugee enslaved people migrated there to gain freedom. The British created a registry of people who had escaped slavery, called the Book of Negroes. The registry included details of their enslavement, escape, and service to the British. If accepted, the former enslaved person received a certificate entitling transport out of New York. By the time the Book of Negroes was closed, it had the names of 1,336 men, 914 women, and 750 children, who were resettled in Nova Scotia. They were known in Canada as Black Loyalists. Sixty-five percent of those evacuated were from the South. About 200 formerly enslaved people were taken to London with British forces as free people.

After the war, many freed Black people living in London and Nova Scotia struggled with discrimination, a slow pace of land grants and, in Canada, with the more severe climate. Supporters in England organized to establish a colony in West Africa for the resettlement of Poor Blacks of London, most of whom were formerly enslaved in America. Freetown was the first settlement established of what became the colony of Sierra Leone. Black Loyalists in Nova Scotia were also asked if they wanted to relocate. Many chose to go to Africa, and on January 15, 1792, 1,193 Black people left Halifax for West Africa and a new life. Later the African colony was supplemented by Afro-Caribbean maroons transported by the British from Jamaica, as well as Africans who were liberated by the British in their intervention in the Atlantic slave trade, after Britain prohibited it in 1807.

== Fate of Black Patriots ==
The African American Patriots who served the Continental Army, found that the postwar military held few rewards for them. It was much reduced in size, and state legislatures such as Connecticut and Massachusetts in 1784 and 1785, respectively, banned all Blacks, free or enslaved, from military service. Southern states also banned all enslaved men from their militias. North Carolina was among the states that allowed free people of color to serve in their militias and bear arms until the 1830s. In 1792, the United States Congress formally excluded African Americans from military service, allowing only "free able-bodied white male citizens" to serve.

At the time of the ratification of the Constitution in 1789, free Black men could vote in five of the thirteen states, including North Carolina. That demonstrated that they were considered citizens not only of their states but of the United States.

Many enslaved men who fought in the war gained freedom, but others did not. Some owners reneged on their promises to free them after their service in the military. Only 500 African-Americans applied for a Revolutionary War pension. It is estimated that half of those who served migrated to northern states, and those who lived long enough to apply for a pension had no one to corroborate their service.

Some African American descendants of Revolutionary war veterans have documented their lineage. Professor Henry Louis Gates and Judge Lawrence W. Pierce, as examples, have joined the Sons of the American Revolution based on documenting male lines of ancestors who served.

In the first two decades following the Revolution, most northern states abolished slavery, some by a gradual method others such as Vermont and Massachusetts did so during the Revolutionary period. Northern states abolished slavery by law or in their new constitutions. By 1810, about 75 percent of all African Americans in the North were free. By 1840, virtually all African Americans in the North were either free or living in free state jurisdiction.

Although southern state legislatures maintained the institution of slavery, in the Upper South, especially, numerous slaveholders were inspired by revolutionary ideals to free the people they had enslaved. In addition, in this period Methodist, Baptist and Quaker preachers also urged manumission. The proportion of free Black people in the Upper South increased markedly, from less than 1 percent of all Black people to more than 10 percent, even as the number of enslaved people was increasing overall. More than half of the number of free Black people in the United States were concentrated in the Upper South. In Delaware, nearly 75 percent of Black people were free by 1810. This was also a result of a changing economy, as many planters had been converting from labor-intensive tobacco to mixed commodity crops, with less need for intensive labor.

After that period, few enslaved people were granted freedom. The invention of the cotton gin made cultivation of short-staple cotton profitable, and the Deep South was developed for this product. This drove up the demand for labor from people who were enslaved in that developing area, creating a demand for more than one million people to be enslaved to be transported to the Deep South in the domestic slave trade. James Roberts wrote regretfully of his Revolutionary War service:

But, instead of freedom, I was, soon after my return, sold to William Ward, separated from my wife and children, taken to New Orleans, and sold at auction sale to Calvin Smith, a planter in Louisiana, for $1500. And now will commence the statement of the payment of my wages—for all of my fighting and suffering in the Revolutionary War for the liberty of this ungrateful, illiberal country—to me and to my race.

=== In popular culture ===
The 2000 film, The Patriot, features an African American character named Occam (played by Jay Arlen Jones). He is an enslaved man who fights in the war in place of his master. After serving a year in the Continental Army, he becomes a free man and continues to serve with the militia until the end of the war. However, the film has been recognized as historically misleading due to the lack of attention that is put on slavery during the film.

== Role of other combatants with African ancestry ==
While not American-based, a French regiment of colored troops (the Chasseurs-Volontaires de Saint-Domingue) under the command of Comte d'Estaing and the largest combatant contingent of color in the American Revolutionary War, fought on behalf of the Patriots in the Siege of Savannah.

== See also ==
- National Liberty Memorial – proposed memorial to commemorate African Americans who fought in the Revolutionary War
- The Colored Patriots of the American Revolution, 1855 book
- African Americans in the American Civil War
