= 1st Rhode Island Regiment =

Continental Army regiment

Varnum's Regiment 9th Continental Infantry Regiment 1st Rhode Island Regiment Rhode Island Regiment Rhode Island Battalion
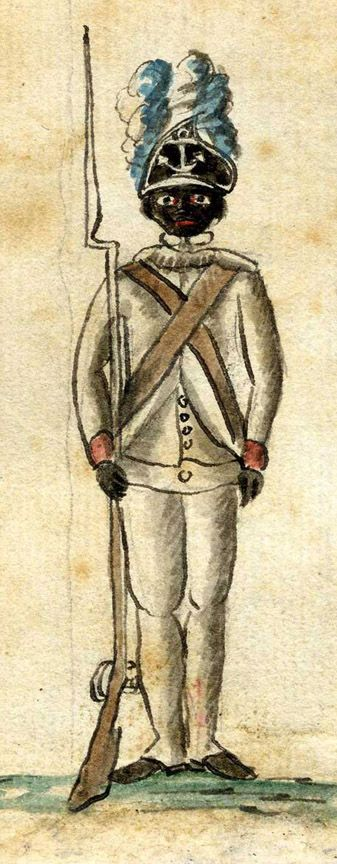
- A 1781 watercolor of a black infantryman of the Rhode Island Regiment (created 1781) of the Continental Army at the Yorktown Campaign. The Rhode Island was one of the few Continental Army regiments with many black soldiers.
- Active: 1775–1783
- Country: United States
- Allegiance: Rhode Island
- Branch: Continental Army
- Type: Infantry
- Part of: Rhode Island Line
- Nicknames: Varnum's Continentals (1775–76); Black Regiment (1778–80)
- Colors: white uniforms
- Engagements: Siege of Boston; New York campaign Battle of Red Bank; Battle of Rhode Island; Siege of Yorktown

Commanders
- Notable commanders: James Mitchell Varnum, Christopher Greene, Jeremiah Olney

Insignia
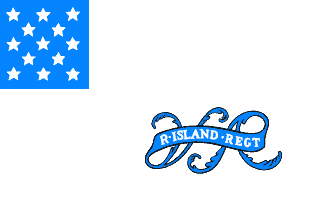
- War Flag

The 1st Rhode Island Regiment (also known as Varnum's Regiment, the 9th Continental Regiment, the Black Regiment, the Rhode Island Regiment, and Olney's Battalion) was a regiment in the Continental Army raised in Rhode Island during the American Revolutionary War (1775–83). It was one of the few units in the Continental Army to serve through the entire war, from the siege of Boston to the disbanding of the Continental Army on November 3, 1783.

The unit underwent several reorganizations and name changes, like most regiments of the Continental Army. It became known as the "Black Regiment" because it was composed mostly of Black enlistees. However, there were also some Indigenous people. Some regard it as the first Black military unit because most of the enlistees after 1778 were non-white.

== Regimental history ==
=== Varnum's Regiment (1775) ===
The 1st Rhode Island was initially formed by the Colonial government before being taken into the Continental Army. The revolutionary Rhode Island Assembly authorized the regiment on May 6, 1775, as part of the Rhode Island Army of Observation. The regiment was organized on May 8, 1775, under Colonel James Mitchell Varnum and was therefore often known as "Varnum's Regiment." It originally consisted of eight companies of volunteers from Kent and Kings Counties.

Varnum marched the regiment to Roxbury, Massachusetts in June 1775, where it took part in the siege of Boston as part of the Army of Observation. It was adopted into the Continental Army by an act of Congress on June 14, 1775. It was expanded to ten companies on June 28 and was assigned to General Nathanael Greene's Brigade in General George Washington's Main Army on July 28. Greene's Brigade was encamped at Prospect Hill in Somerville. General Washington officially took command of the Continental Army upon his arrival in Cambridge, Massachusetts on July 3, 1775.

The soldiers of Varnum's Regiment had enlisted until the end of 1775, like all others in the Continental Army, and the regiment was discharged on December 31, along with the remainder of the army.

=== 9th Continental Regiment (1776) ===
The Continental Army was completely reorganized at the beginning of 1776, with many regiments receiving new names and others being disbanded. Enlistments were for one year. Varnum's Regiment was reorganized with eight companies on January 1, 1776, and re-designated as the 9th Continental Regiment. Under Colonel Varnum, the regiment remained near Boston until the British evacuated the city in March. It was then ordered to Long Island and took part in the disastrous New York and New Jersey campaign, including the Battle of Long Island and the Battle of Harlem Heights, retreating from New York with the Main Army. The Continental Army was reorganized at the end of the year, as was the case in 1775. Still, soldiers were now allowed to enlist for "three years or the war", unlike the previous practice of enlisting only until the end of the year.

=== 1st Rhode Island Regiment (1777–80) ===
The Continental Army was reorganized in 1776, and the 9th Continental Regiment was re-designated as the 1st Rhode Island Regiment. Colonel Varnum was promoted to brigadier general on February 27, 1777, and was succeeded by Colonel Christopher Greene, a distant cousin of General Nathanael Greene. Under Colonel Greene, the regiment, along with the 2nd Rhode Island Regiment, successfully defended Fort Mercer at the Battle of Red Bank on October 22, 1777, against an assault by 2,000 Hessians.

The regiment spent the winter of 1777 to 1778 at Valley Forge near Philadelphia. It endured the hardships of hunger, disease, and exposure to cold along with other units of the Continental Army. In early 1778, the regiment and the 2nd Rhode Island returned to Rhode Island to prepare for an upcoming expedition to dislodge British and Hessian forces occupying the city of Newport.

==== The "Black Regiment" (1778–81) ====
Black soldiers had been a part of the Continental Army since the first shots at Lexington and Concord in April 1775. The Black soldiers in those integrated militias served throughout the war. However, Black recruits were technically barred from military service in the Continental Army from November 12, 1775, until February 23, 1778. Even so, many slave owners who did not want to serve sent slaves to serve in their place. As Frederick Mackenzie reported on June 30, 1777, the rebels "find it so difficult to raise men for the Continental Army, that they enlist Negroes, for whom their owners receive a bounty of 180 dollars, and half their pay; and the Negro gets the other half, and a promise of freedom after three years." Rhode Island continued to have difficulties recruiting enough white men to meet the troop quotas set by the Continental Congress in 1778, so the Rhode Island Assembly decided to pursue a suggestion made by General Varnum to enlist enslaved men into the 1st Rhode Island Regiment. Varnum had raised the idea in a letter to George Washington, who forwarded it to the governor of Rhode Island without explicitly approving or disapproving of the plan. On February 14, 1778, the Rhode Island General Assembly voted to allow the enlistment of "every able-bodied negro, mulatto, or Indian man slave" who chose to do so, and voted that "every slave so enlisting shall, upon his passing muster before Colonel Christopher Greene, be immediately discharged from the service of his master or mistress, and be absolutely free." The owners of enlisted slaves were to be compensated by the Assembly equal to their market value.

Eighty-eight slaves enlisted in the regiment over the next four months, as well as some free Black and Native American men. The regiment eventually totaled about 225 men; as many as 140 were Black. The 1st Rhode Island became the only regiment of the Continental Army to have segregated companies of Black soldiers; other regiments that allowed Black men to enlist were integrated. The enlistment of slaves had been controversial, and no more non-white men were enlisted after June 1778. The unit continued to be known as the "Black Regiment", even though only white men were recruited to replace losses, a process which eventually made it an integrated unit.

Discussing the regiment in his 2003 book, An Imperfect God: George Washington, His Slaves, and the Creation of America, historian Henry Wiencek observed, “There is no record of a popular outcry against the black presence, no record of fights or interdisciplinary problems caused by racial integration. The common white New England soldier seems to have accepted blacks. The objections to the black presence came not from the rank and file but from the highest levels of policy makers and politicians.”

==== Battle of Rhode Island ====
The regiment fought in the Battle of Rhode Island in August 1778 under the command of Major Samuel Ward Jr., as Colonel Greene had been assigned as a brigade commander for the campaign. It played an important role by defending a redoubt on West Main Road, where it successfully repelled three charges by the Hessians. Repeated attacks from British regulars and Hessian forces failed to break the line of the Patriot forces and allowed the successful withdrawal of Sullivan's army the following night. Historian Sidney Rider notes that the Hessians charged three times and were repulsed each time. According to Rider, the Hessian Colonel "applied to exchange his command and go to New York, because he dared not lead his regiment" into battle again, "lest his men should shoot him for having caused them so much loss." The First Rhode Island suffered three killed, nine wounded, and eleven missing.

After a day of battle, General Sullivan decided that his forces were insufficient and ordered an orderly withdrawal at night. His soldiers left their campfires burning to make the British and Hessians think that they were still in place. The operation lasted a total of four hours for six Continental brigades. Sullivan praised the Rhode Island Regiment for its actions, saying that they bore "a proper share of the day's honors." General Lafayette proclaimed the battle as "the best fought action of the war."

The regiment saw little action over the next three years since the focus of the war shifted to the south. It remained in Rhode Island to defend against a possible attack by the British forces in Newport. It was later sent to Westchester County in New York, where the Continental Army was located.

=== Rhode Island Regiment (1781–1783) ===
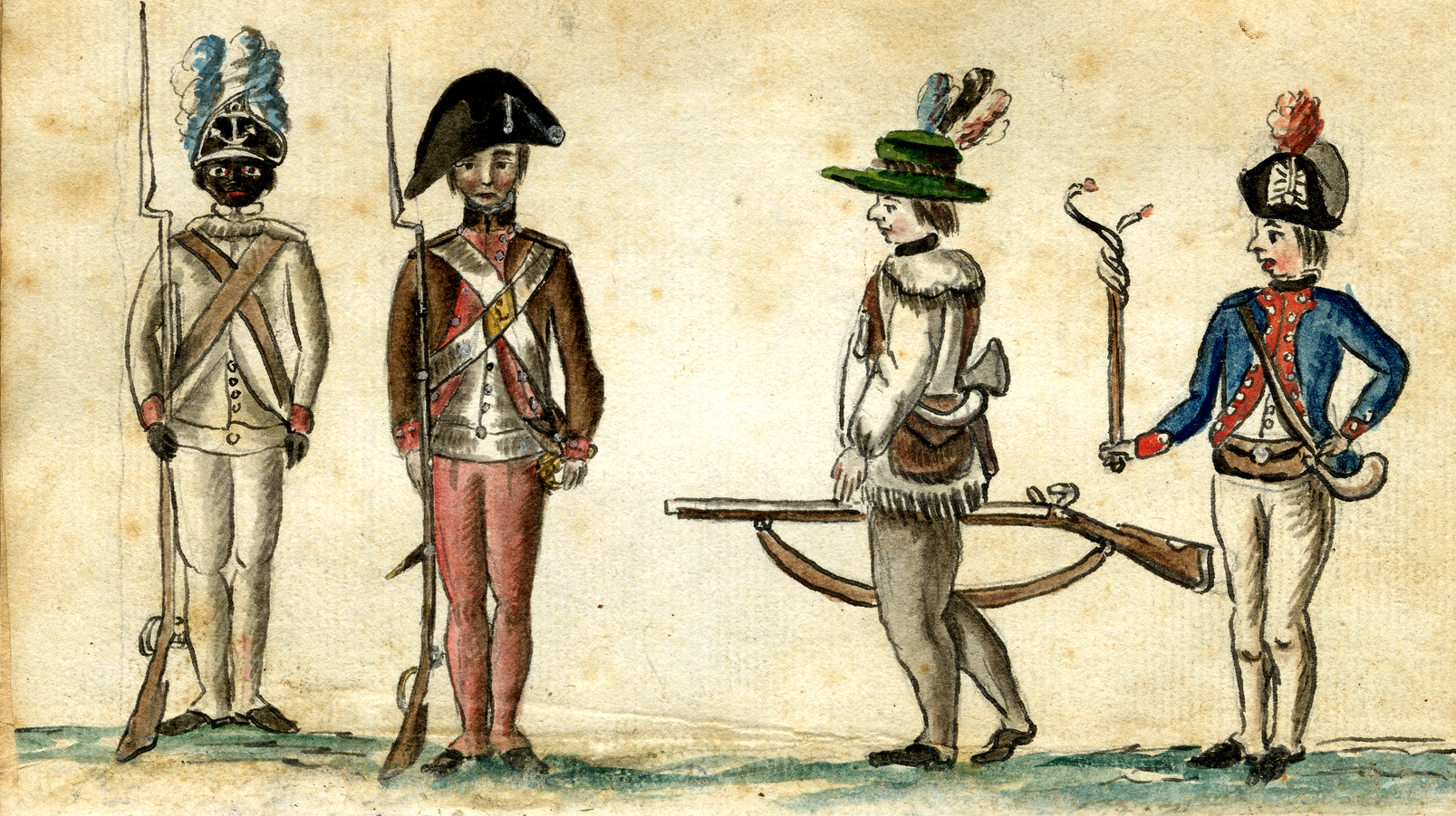
1781 watercolor drawing of American soldiers from the Yorktown campaign, showing a Black infantryman from the Rhode Island Regiment on the far left

On January 1, 1781, the regiment was consolidated with the 2nd Rhode Island Regiment at West Point, New York, and was re-designated as the Rhode Island Regiment. The regiment spent the early months of 1781 in an area of the Hudson River Valley called the "Neutral Ground" by later historians.

==== Campaign in the Neutral Ground ====
The "Neutral Ground" was an area in the Hudson River Valley east of the river described as "a desolate, sparsely populated buffer zone between the forces of the English to the South and the Americans to the North." People who continued to live in the area had to deal with "theft, murder, and destruction" by renegade groups, such as the "cowboys" or the "skinners." These renegade groups "cloaked their plundering under an alleged allegiance to one of the combatants." The renegades, also called "refugees" were loyalists who fled Westchester County to New York City when Patriot forces controlled the county.

To whichever side the renegade groups leaned, they would forage for goods to sustain "both men and beasts of burden."

The constant foraging and raiding in the neutral ground caused Major-General Heath to command Colonel Greene and the Rhode Island Regiment to defend Pine's Bridge on the Croton River from "marauding Cowboys" who frequently made incursions from their base in Morrisania (South Bronx), under the command of loyalist leader Lieutenant Colonel James De Lancey, the former sheriff of Westchester County.

==== Battle of Pine's Bridge ====
On May 14 1781, De Lancey's Cowboys assaulted Pine's Bridge (near present-day Yorktown, New York) and caught Colonel Greene and a small detachment of the Rhode Island Regiment by surprise. Delancey's troops killed Colonel Greene, his second-in-command Major Ebenezer Flagg, and six African-American soldiers of the Rhode Island Regiment; two more died of their wounds after the battle. The Black soldiers were reported to have "defended their beloved Col. Greene so well that it was only over their dead bodies that the enemy reached and murdered him." Greene's body "was found in the woods, about a mile distant from his tent, cut, and mangled in the most shocking way" as punishment for having led Black soldiers against them.

=== Last years ===
Following the death of Colonel Greene, Lieutenant Colonel Jeremiah Olney took command of the regiment. Under Olney's command, the regiment took part in the Siege of Yorktown in October 1781, the last major battle of the Revolution. After Yorktown, the regiment moved with the Main Army to Newburgh, New York, where its primary purpose was to be ready to react if British forces in the city went on the offensive.

On January 22, 1783, the regiment was placed under the command of Colonel Marinus Willett of the New York Militia, along with other units, to capture Fort Ontario in the town of Oswego, New York on the shore of Lake Ontario. On February 8, the force of about 500 soldiers, with 120 horse-drawn sleighs, left Fort Herkimer near Utica. Although the expedition got within a mile of Fort Ontario, the attack was called off at the last minute as the moon was not due to set with enough time before daybreak to make a surprise attack. After the expedition, the Rhode Island Regiment returned to Newburgh, where it remained for the remainder of its service.

=== Rhode Island Battalion (1783) ===
On March 1, 1783, the regiment was reorganized into six companies and designated as the Rhode Island Battalion (a.k.a. "Olney's Rhode Island Battalion"). On June 15, the Rhode Island Regiment veterans with at least three years of service were discharged at Saratoga, New York, and the remaining soldiers of the battalion who were enlisted for three years were organized into a small battalion of two companies. The British evacuated New York on November 25, and the Rhode Island Battalion disbanded on December 25 at Saratoga, New York. It was one of the few units in the Continental Army to have served through its entire existence.

== Disbandment ==
A Black soldier's pay slip for service to the Continental Army during the Revolutionary War

The Rhode Island Regiment served its final days in Saratoga, New York under the command of Brevet Major William Allen. The regiment was left waiting in Saratoga for months, with low supplies and a terrible snowstorm, until Major William Allen and Adjutant Jeremiah Greenman printed the discharge certificates on December 25, 1783. The discharged troops were "dumped back into civilian society," according to one historian, with only the white soldiers being guaranteed 100 acres of bounty land from the federal government, as well as a pension.

The Rhode Island General Assembly had already guaranteed the Black soldiers their freedom after the war, and the Rhode Island General Assembly passed an act on February 23, 1784, which forbade "any person born in Rhode Island after March 1, 1784, from being made a slave." The act also stipulated that children born to enslaved people were to be supported financially by the Rhode Island town in which they were born. During the same meeting, Colonel Olney presented the colors of Rhode Island's Continental Regiment to the General Assembly, and they have been housed in the Rhode Island State House ever since. Olney had promised his men his "interest in their favour," and he continued to advocate for his former troops' right to remain free and to have the government pay them the wages or pensions that they deserved.

In June 1784, 13 Black Rhode Island Regiment veterans hired Samuel Emory to present their claims for back pay to the War Department Accounts Office to help alleviate the financial difficulties that most Black veterans faced after the war. In response, the Rhode Island Assembly passed a special act for these soldiers on February 28, 1785, which called for "the support of paupers, who heretofore were slaves, and enlisted into the Continental battalions." Therefore, any "Indian, negro or mulatto" who was sick or unable to support himself must be taken care of by the town council where he lived.

Some veterans of the Rhode Island Continental Line remained in Rhode Island, although some moved onto the 100 acres of Bounty Land they were promised in states like New York or Ohio. Most veterans who survived into their 50s or 60s were in desperate poverty because of the economic depression after the Revolution.

== Significant campaigns and battles ==
- Siege of Boston (May 1775 to March 17, 1776)
- Battle of Bunker Hill (June 17, 1775)
- Battle of Long Island (August 22, 1776)
- Battle of Harlem Heights (September 16, 1776)
- Battle of White Plains (October 28, 1776)
- Battle of Trenton (January 2, 1777)
- Battle of Princeton (January 3, 1777)
- Battle of Red Bank (October 22, 1777)
- Siege of Fort Mifflin (October 23 to November 16, 1777)
- Valley Forge (December 19, 1777 to June 19, 1778)
- Battle of Rhode Island (August 29, 1778)
- Stationed at Bristol, Rhode Island (September 1778)
- Winter Quarters in Warren, Rhode Island (December 1778 to Spring 1779)
- Aquidneck Island, Rhode Island (October 1779 to January 1781)
- Quartered in upstate New York (January 1781 to December 25, 1783)
- Battle of Pine's Bridge (May 14, 1781)
- Siege and Battle of Yorktown (September 28 to October 19, 1781)
- Quartered at Newburgh, New York (1782)
- Oswego Expedition (January to February 1783)

== Senior officers ==
Colonels and commanding officers

- Colonel James M. Varnum; May 3, 1775 - February 27, 1777 (promoted to brigadier general)

(Colonel Varnum was commissioned as a brigadier general in the Rhode Island state militia on December 12, 1776, and commanded a brigade of Rhode Island state troops serving in Rhode Island until his promotion to brigadier general in the Continental Army on February 27, 1777.)

- Colonel Christopher Greene; February 27, 1777 - May 14, 1781 (killed in action)
- Lieutenant Colonel Commandant Jeremiah Olney; 14 May 1781 - 25 December 1783 (discharged)

Lieutenant Colonels

- James Babcock; May 3, 1775 - December 31, 1775 (discharged)
- Archibald Crary; January 1, 1776 - December 31, 1776 (discharged)

(Colonel Crary was appointed lieutenant colonel of Stanton's State Regiment on August 12, 1776.)

- Adam Comstock; January 1, 1777 - April 1778 (resigned)
- Samuel Ward Jr.; May 5, 1779 (date of rank May 26, 1778) - December 31, 1780 (retired)
- Jeremiah Olney; January 1, 1781 - May 14, 1781 (became regimental commander)

Majors

- Christopher Greene; May 3, 1775 - December 31, 1775 (taken prisoner and not exchanged until August 1776)
- Christopher Smith; January 1, 1776 - October 27, 1776 (transferred to 2nd Rhode Island Regiment)
- Henry Sherburne; October 28, 1776 - January 11, 1777 (promoted to colonel)
- Samuel Ward Jr.; January 12, 1777 - May 26, 1778 (promoted to lieutenant colonel)
- Silas Talbot; October 10, 1777 (date of rank September 1, 1777) - November 12, 1778 (promoted to lieutenant colonel)
- Ebenezer Flagg; May 5, 1779 (date of rank May 26, 1778) - May 14, 1781 (killed in action)
- Coggeshall Olney; August 25, 1781 (date of rank May 14, 1781) - March 17, 1783 (resigned)
- John S. Dexter; August 25, 1781 (date of rank May 14, 1781) - November 3, 1783 (discharged)

== Men of color ==
=== Privates ===
- Robert Green
- Prince Greene, March 1778 - June 28, 1783

== Legacy ==
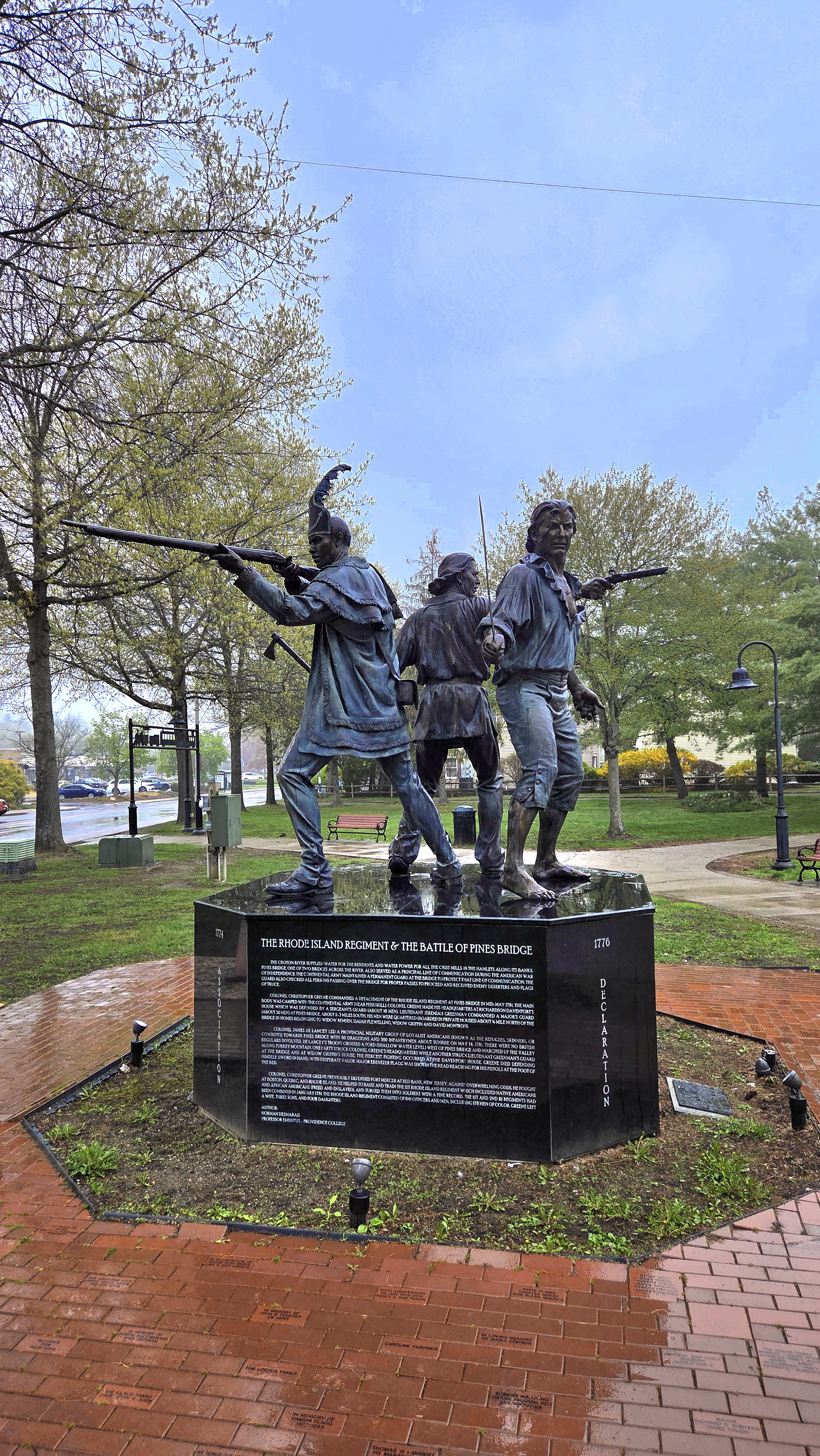
Pines Bridge Monument in Yorktown Heights

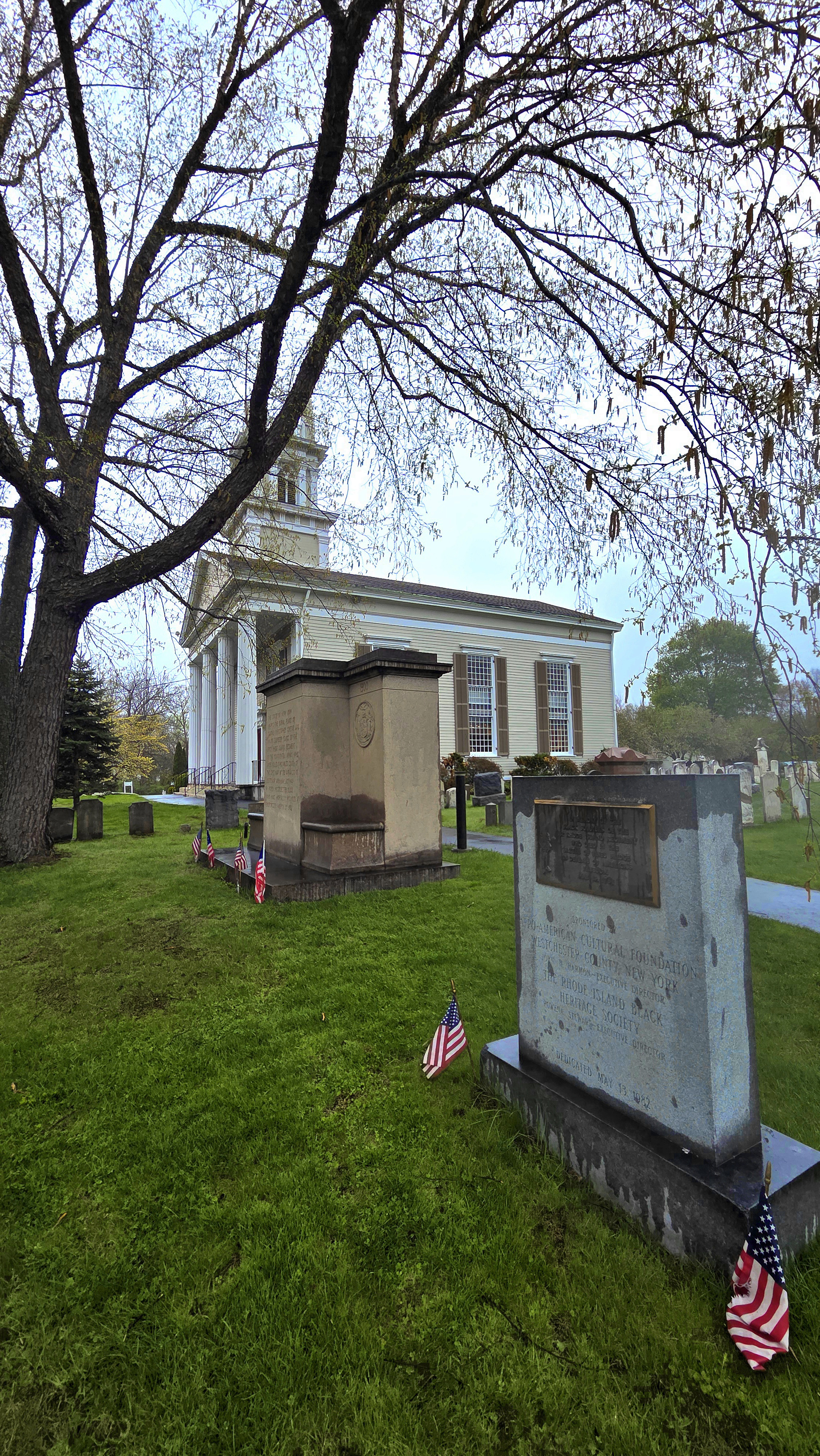
Greene-Flagg burial place marker (center) and Monument to the 1st Rhode Island Regiment (lower right)

There is a monument to the 1st Rhode Island Regiment at Patriots Park in Portsmouth, Rhode Island, on the Battle of Rhode Island site. This monument lists names, maps, and details of all who fought in the Battle of Rhode Island. The 1st Rhode Island regimental flag is preserved at the Rhode Island State House in Providence.

Colonel Greene and Major Flagg were buried in unmarked graves at the Crompond Presbyterian Burying Ground in Yorktown Heights, New York, several miles north of the site of their deaths. In 1900, the State of New York erected a large burial place marker over their graves. Nearby, the Monument to the 1st Rhode Island Regiment was installed in 1982, honoring the memory of the African American soldiers who died in battle and whose burial location is unknown; this memorial was added to the African American Heritage Trail of Westchester County in 2004.

In the center of Yorktown Heights, the Pines Bridge Monument was dedicated in 2018. A heroic sculpture by noted sculptor Thomas Jay Warren depicts three figures—Col. Christopher Greene and two of his soldiers—an African American and a Native American.

The uniformed ceremonial unit of the Varnum Continentals is called "Varnum's Regiment". Its uniform is similar to that worn by infantry units in the early years of the American Revolution.

== See also ==
- African Americans in the Revolutionary War
- James M. Varnum
- Christopher Greene
- Jeremiah Olney
- Prince Greene
- 2nd Rhode Island Regiment
- Sherburne's Additional Continental Regiment
- Richmond's Regiment
- Babcock's/Lippitt's Regiment
