= Job Greene =

Major Job Greene

Speaker of the Rhode Island House of Representatives
- In office October 1727 – April 1728
- Preceded by: Thomas Frye
- Succeeded by: Henry Bull

Personal details
- Born: 24 August 1656 Warwick, Colony of Rhode Island, British America
- Died: 6 July 1745 (aged 88) Pawtuxet, Colony of Rhode Island, British America
- Spouse: Phebe Sayles (m. 1684; died 1744)
- Relations: John Greene (grandfather); Christopher Greene (grandson); William Greene Sr. (nephew)
- Children: 10
- Parent(s): John Greene Jr. Ann Almy

Major Job Greene (24 August 1656 – 6 July 1745) was a colonial Rhode Island politician.

== Early life ==
Greene was born on 24 August 1656 in Warwick in the Colony of Rhode Island and Providence Plantations. He was a son of John Greene Jr. (1620–1708) and Ann (née Almy) Greene (1627–1709).

== Career ==
Like his father before him, Greene "became one of the leading men of the town in colonial affairs", active from 1681 when he became a freeman of the colony until his retirement in 1744 shortly before his death. He served as Deputy (precursor to Representative) from Warwick to the General Assembly beginning in 1696 for thirteen consecutive terms. He served as Assistant for nine years, and Speaker of the House of Deputies from October 1727 to April 1728.

Sometime before 1700, Greene built a home and mill on his large farms, laying the foundation for Centerville, Rhode Island.

== Personal life ==
On 22 January 1684, Greene was married to Phebe Sayles (1658–1744), daughter of John Sayles, who served in the House of Deputies, and Mary (née Williams) Sayles, and granddaughter of Roger Williams, 9th President of the Colony of Rhode Island. Phebe's sister Elinor married his brother Richard and her sister Mary married his brother William. Together, they were the parents of:

- Ann Greene (1685–1718), who married Thomas Stafford.
- Mary Greene (1687–1783), who married Capt. John Greene.
- Deborah Greene (1689–1763), who married Capt. Simon Ray, chief magistrate of Block Island.
- Job Greene (b. 1692), who died young.
- Phebe Greene (b. 1694), who married William Arnold.
- Christopher Greene (b. c. 1696), who married Elizabeth Denmark.
- Daniel Greene (b. c. 1698), who married Temperance Harris. After her death he married Bethiah (née Howland) Davis.
- Richard Greene (1700–1700), who died young.
- Catharine Greene (b. c. 1701), who married Maj. James Brown.
- Philip Greene (b. c. 1704), a Judge who married Elizabeth Wickes.

Greene died on 6 July 1745 in Pawtuxet, Rhode Island and was buried at Easton cemetery in Middletown, near Newport.

=== Descendants ===
Through his daughter Deborah, he was a grandfather of Judith Ray (wife of Thomas Hubbard, Esq. of Boston), Anne Ray (wife of Governor Samuel Ward), Catherine Ray (a literary companion of Benjamin Franklin, who married her second cousin Governor William Greene Jr.), Phebe Ray (wife of John Littlefield, Esq. of New Shoreham).

Through his youngest son, Judge Phillip, he was the grandfather of Col. Christopher Greene (1737–1781), who led the defense of Fort Mercer in the 1777 Battle of Red Bank during the American Revolutionary War and was killed by Loyalists in May 1781 at the Battle of Pine's Bridge.
