= Prince Greene =

Rhode Island violinist and soldier (1752–1819)

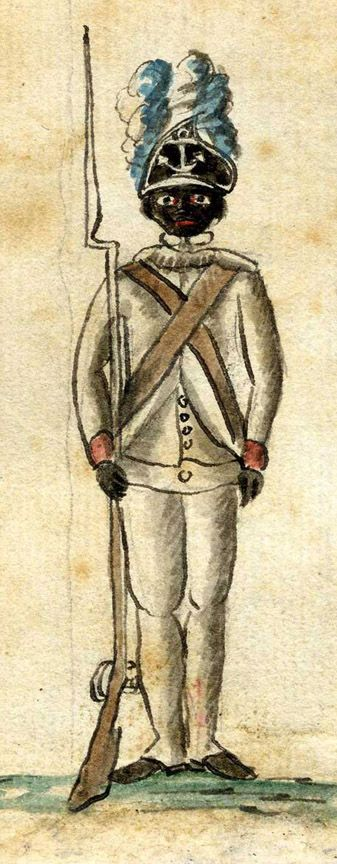
- Portrait of 1st Rhode Island Regiment Soldier, 1780
- Died: July 4, 1819
- Burial place: Common Burying Ground
- Military career
- Branch: Continental Army
- Service years: 1777–1785
- Rank: Private
- Service number: S.38754
- Unit: 1st Rhode Island Regiment
- Conflicts: American Revolution

Prince Greene (1752 – July 4, 1819) was a Black violinist who lived in the Colony of Rhode Island and Providence Plantations. In 1777, while he was enslaved by Richard Greene, he enlisted as a Private in the 1st Rhode Island Regiment to pursue his freedom in the Continental Army during the American Revolution. In 1781, while an active duty soldier, Greene was court-martialed for an incident that resulted in the death of Edward Allen, a white civilian. Also an active musician, in the early decades of the 1800s, he would play the fiddle for private parties in East Greenwich, Rhode Island.

== Early life and enslavement ==
Prince Greene was enslaved by Richard Greene, of Potowomut, Rhode Island. Richard was a descendant of John Greene, an original settler of Warwick, Rhode Island. Richard's grandfather, Thomas Greene, built Hopelands, a historic house, sometime in 1686. The home is now part of the campus of Rocky Hill School. Over time, Prince began to work as a laborer in the Greene family farms in Coventry and West Greenwich.

A "desertion notice" from May 4, 1776, lists Prince Greene's age as "24 years of age," which, if true, would indicate he was possibly born in 1752. On June 21, 1778, in North Kingstown, Rhode Island, Prince was married to Rhoda Eldred "by elder Philip Jenkins."

Runaway Slave Ad for "Prince, a Negro Slave" of Richard Greene, in Providence Gazette, May 4, 1776

== 1776, Escape ==
On May 4, 1776, the day Rhode Island declared independence from the Kingdom of Great Britain, Richard Greene published a runaway slave ad in The Providence Gazette for "a Negro Slave named Prince." The ad describes him as "about 24 Years of Age, 5 Feet 4 Inches high, has very thick Lips and small, crooked Legs." Richard Greene offered a "Five Dollar Reward" to anyone who could return Prince to him.

== 1st Rhode Island Regiment ==
=== Enlistment ===
Historian Robert Geake, in his book From Slaves to Soldiers, writes that Prince Greene was "listed in the 1777 military census and was no doubt eager to enlist in this opportunity for freedom." Between 1777 and 1781, the 1st Rhode Island Regiment fought in the Battle of Red Bank, the Siege of Fort Mifflin, Valley Forge, and the Battle of Rhode Island. Greene enlisted about March 1778 as evidenced by his being entitled to a "badge of distinction" (awarded for 3 years of honorable service) in September 1782 when he had 4 years and 6 months of service.

=== Court-martial ===
Geake said Prince Greene was "exceptional in being one of a handful of black soldiers to face court martial." On April 10, 1781, in Providence, Rhode Island, while the town was still under martial law, young residents often challenged the local militia and Continental troops after a night of carousing. That night in April, a twenty-three-year-old Providence man named Edward Allen, in the company of another man named John Pitcher, approached the barracks and began to throw stones and hurl "illiberal language" at the soldiers inside.

According to historian John Wood Sweet in his book Bodies Politic, the barracks were adjacent to the Rhode Island State House to protect the local gunpowder reserve. Sweet also notes, "The two assailants were men of prime fighting age—Edward Allen was twenty-three—but neither seems to have served in the local militia or in the Continental Army. In this sense, the soldiers they attacked were their substitutes. Whatever touched off their anger that night was apparently tied to the fact that the soldiers in the barracks included members of at least two all-black companies."

Sweet continues, "The soldiers had been slow to defend themselves and their honor, but this insult was too much. One 'negro soldier in the battalion,' Prince Greene--a dark-complexioned man, standing five foot five and about thirty-seven years old—loaded his musket and sailed forth. Clues to his courage come from several sources. It may be that he had already been a free man when he enlisted at Warwick, on 27 March 1777, and agreed to serve for the duration of the war. Very likely he was somehow connected to the town's large Greene clan, which included the state's current governor. In any case, he had been living as a soldier for four years and had seen a good deal of combat. ... The musket ball hit its mark with remarkable precision: it struck the back of Allen's head, bored a hole about an inch in diameter, and shot through his forehead. He died instantly."

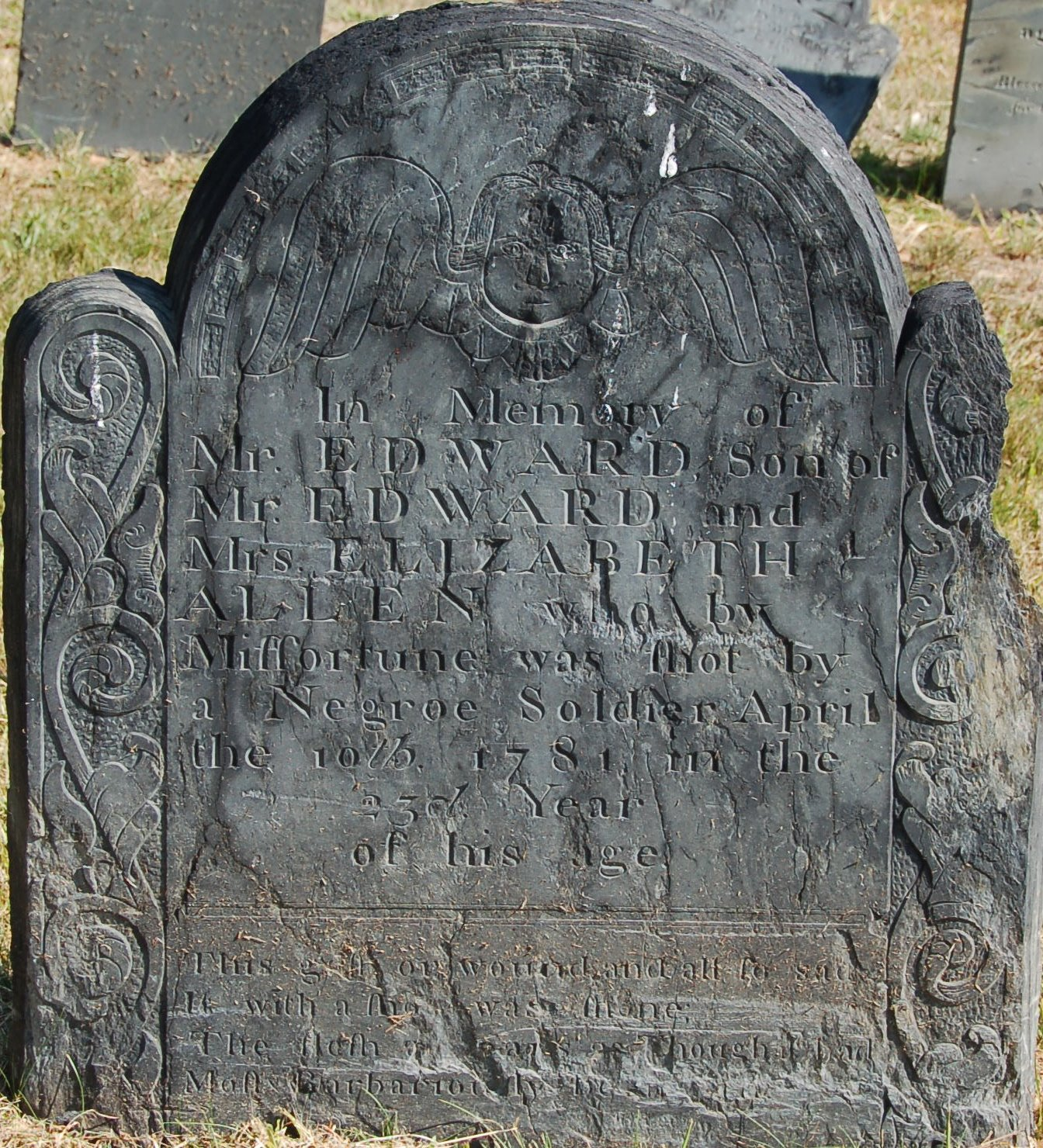
Grave of Edward Allen, "who by Misfortune was shot by a Negro Soldier April the 10th 1781."

According to Geake, "The incident caused an uproar, especially as a black soldier had fired the fatal shot at a white resident. As the state's Supreme Court was sitting in Providence at the time, Greene was brought to trial just four days later." Greene was defended by David Howell, a prominent attorney and later Rhode Island delegate to the Continental Congress and Associate justice of the Rhode Island Supreme Court, a friend of Colonel Christopher Greene, and other high-ranking officers of the Continental Army. Prince Greene was found "not guilty of willful murder but manslaughter." He was accordingly branded with an "M" on his hand and was eventually allowed to rejoin the regiment. The victim's mother, Elizabeth Allen, outraged by what she saw as a lack of justice, commissioned the Hartshorne gravestone carvers of Newport to furnish his stone in Providence's North Burial ground, which recounts his "misfortune of being shot by a negro soldier," an act "Most barbarously done."

Sweet writes, "For many years, Edward Allen's epitaph stood as one of the only public commemorations of black military service in the Revolutionary War."

== Later life and death ==
=== After the Revolution ===
According to Geake, Greene served over four years and six months as a Private in the Continental Army, earning a badge of distinction. He was discharged on 15 June 1783. After the American Revolution, Greene appeared on the "List of Invalids resident in the State of Rhode Island of 1785", where he described injuries he sustained during the winter of 1783, under the service of Colonel Marinus Willett in Oswego, New York as "the loss of all the toes and the feet very tender, by means of severe frost, when on the Oswego expedition."

=== Freedom ===
According to historian John Wood Sweet, Prince Green, like many other veterans, "returned to a weary, economically depressed, and seemingly ungrateful homeland." Greene was listed as a "free person" living in East Greenwich, Rhode Island on the 1790 United States census, living with two other free people, possibly his wife, and child.

In his book History of the Town of East Greenwich, Daniel Howland Greene writes about many spinning parties in the town, especially once the calico print was introduced. He writes, "The highest frolics were the large quilting parties. After the quilt was finished and rolled up out of the way, a dance was next in order. The music was supplied by the violin of an old negro named Prince Greene." According to records in the Rhode Island Historical Society, a Black man named "Prince Greene of East Greenwich" regularly purchased violin strings and house goods from a merchant named William Arnold, and often paid his bills with an evening of fiddle music.

=== Death ===
Prince Greene died on July 4, 1819. He is buried in Common Burying Ground in Newport, Rhode Island. According to the Rhode Island Historical Cemetery Commission, his gravestone was carved by one of the enslaved Black stonemasons from The John Stevens Shop.

== See also ==
- 1st Rhode Island Regiment
- John Greene
- Col. Christopher Greene
