= Yorktown Heights, New York =

- Census-designated place
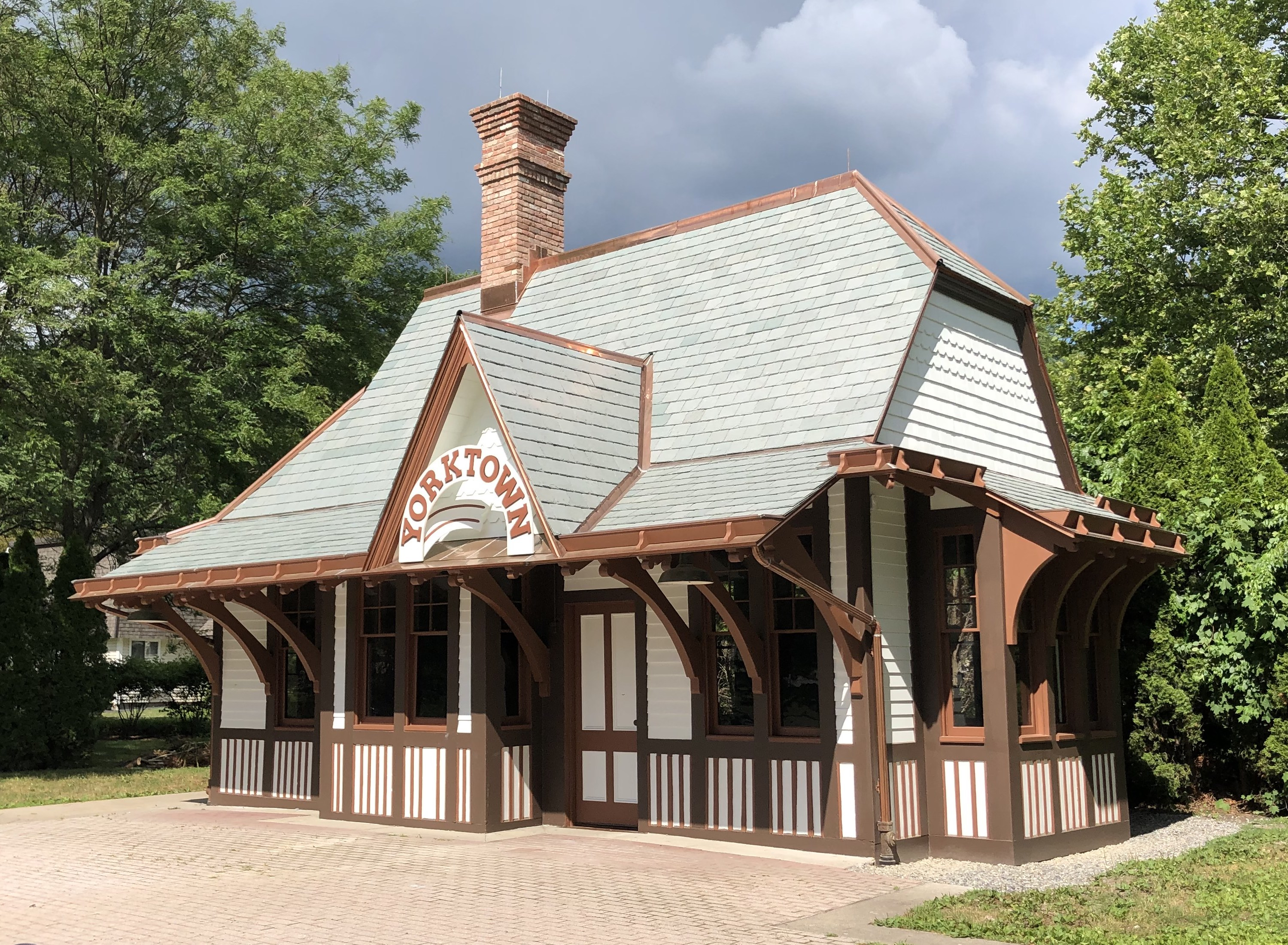
- The Tudor Revival Yorktown Heights station

- Location of Yorktown Heights, New York
- Coordinates: 41°16′38″N 73°46′53″W
- Country: United States
- State: New York
- County: Westchester
- Town: Yorktown

Area
  - Total: 0.92 sq mi (2.39 km^{2})
  - Land: 0.92 sq mi (2.38 km^{2})
  - Water: 0.0039 sq mi (0.01 km^{2})
- Elevation: 490 ft (150 m)

Population (2020)
  - Total: 1,884
  - Density: 2,050.8/sq mi (791.81/km^{2})
- Time zone: UTC-5 (Eastern (EST))
  - Summer (DST): UTC-4 (EDT)
- ZIP code: 10598
- Area code: 914
- FIPS code: 36-84088
- GNIS feature ID: 0971839
- Website: www.yorktownny.org

Yorktown Heights is a census-designated place (CDP) in the town of Yorktown in Westchester County, New York, United States. As of the 2020 census, Yorktown Heights had a population of 1,884.

== History ==
Yorktown Heights is in the town of Yorktown, in northern Westchester County, 45 miles from New York City, with 40 square miles of rolling hills, farmland, residential areas, and light industry, including the IBM Thomas J. Watson Research Center. First settled in 1683, Yorktown was of strategic importance during the American Revolution, with the Pine's Bridge crossing of the Croton River guarded by the 1st Rhode Island Regiment, an integrated unit that included African Americans and Native Americans. The commanding officers of the regiment, who died in the Battle of Pine's Bridge, are buried at the First Presbyterian Church cemetery in Yorktown Heights. Nearby, there is the Monument to the 1st Rhode Island Regiment, and in the center of Yorktown Heights, the Pines Bridge Battle Monument.

Yorktown was incorporated in 1788 and named in commemoration of the decisive Franco-American victory at Yorktown, Virginia. The Yorktown Heights Railroad Station, which last had passenger service on the New York Central Railroad's Putnam Division in 1958, was added to the National Register of Historic Places in 1981.

== Geography ==
Yorktown Heights is at 41°16′38″N 73°46′53″W (41.277347, −73.781290).

The Yorktown Heights Census-designated place (CDP) has an area of 0.93 square miles (2.4 km^{2}), all land.

Like much of northern Westchester County, Yorktown is largely hilly and wooded.

=== Climate ===
Climate data for Yorktown Heights, New York
Month	Jan	Feb	Mar	Apr	May	Jun	Jul	Aug	Sep	Oct	Nov	Dec	Year
Record high °F (°C)	67 (19)	73 (23)	85 (29)	95 (35)	94 (34)	94 (34)	100 (38)	100 (38)	95 (35)	87 (31)	79 (26)	73 (23)	100 (38)
Mean daily maximum °F (°C)	35.5 (1.9)	38.6 (3.7)	46.8 (8.2)	59.7 (15.4)	69.6 (20.9)	78.0 (25.6)	83.0 (28.3)	81.1 (27.3)	74.4 (23.6)	62.5 (16.9)	51.4 (10.8)	40.8 (4.9)	60.1 (15.6)
Mean daily minimum °F (°C)	16.7 (−8.5)	17.9 (−7.8)	25.4 (−3.7)	35.9 (2.2)	47.8 (8.8)	55.2 (12.9)	60.8 (16.0)	59.3 (15.2)	51.9 (11.1)	40.9 (4.9)	31.5 (−0.3)	23.3 (−4.8)	38.9 (3.8)
Record low °F (°C)	−15 (−26)	−10 (−23)	0 (−18)	14 (−10)	30 (−1)	38 (3)	46 (8)	39 (4)	32 (0)	20 (−7)	11 (−12)	−9 (−23)	−15 (−26)
Average precipitation inches (mm)	3.72 (94)	3.06 (78)	4.10 (104)	3.89 (99)	3.91 (99)	5.00 (127)	4.32 (110)	4.28 (109)	4.80 (122)	4.61 (117)	4.24 (108)	4.37 (111)	50.30 (1,278)
Average snowfall inches (cm)	8.8 (22)	12.6 (32)	8.2 (21)	1.8 (4.6)	0 (0)	0 (0)	0 (0)	0 (0)	0 (0)	0 (0)	0.5 (1.3)	7.6 (19)	39.50 (100.3)
Average precipitation days	11.1	8.6	10.5	11.1	11.6	11.3	10.3	9.9	8.9	9.4	9.1	10.5	122.3
Average snowy days	5.2	4.1	3.3	0.4	0	0	0	0	0	0	0.5	3.4	16.9
Source: NOAA

== Demographics ==
Historical population
Census	Pop.	Note	%±
2020	1,884		—
U.S. Decennial Census

As of the census of 2000, there were 7,972 people, 2,629 households, and 2,163 families residing in the CDP. The population density was 1,399.3/mi^{2} (540.0/km^{2}). There were 2,661 housing units at an average density of 467.1/mi^{2} (180.2/km^{2}). The racial makeup of the CDP was 90.49% White, 2.41% African American, 0.06% Native American, 4.69% Asian, 0.01% Pacific Islander, 0.85% from other races, and 1.48% from two or more races. Hispanic or Latino of any race were 5.59% of the population.

There were 2,629 households, out of which 44.6% had children under the age of 18 living with them, 73.0% were married couples living together, 7.2% had a female householder with no husband present, and 17.7% were non-families. 15.3% of all households were made up of individuals, and 9.0% had someone living alone who was 65 years of age or older. The average household size was 3.02 and the average family size was 3.37.

In the CDP, the population was spread out, with 28.4% under the age of 18, 5.8% from 18 to 24, 27.1% from 25 to 44, 27.4% from 45 to 64, and 11.3% who were 65 years of age or older. The median age was 39 years. For every 100 females, there were 95.9 males. For every 100 females age 18 and over, there were 90.6 males.

The median income for a household in the CDP was $108,648, and the median income for a family was $137,580. Males had a median income of $91,365 versus $80,261 for females. The per capita income for the CDP was $41,349.

== Landmarks ==
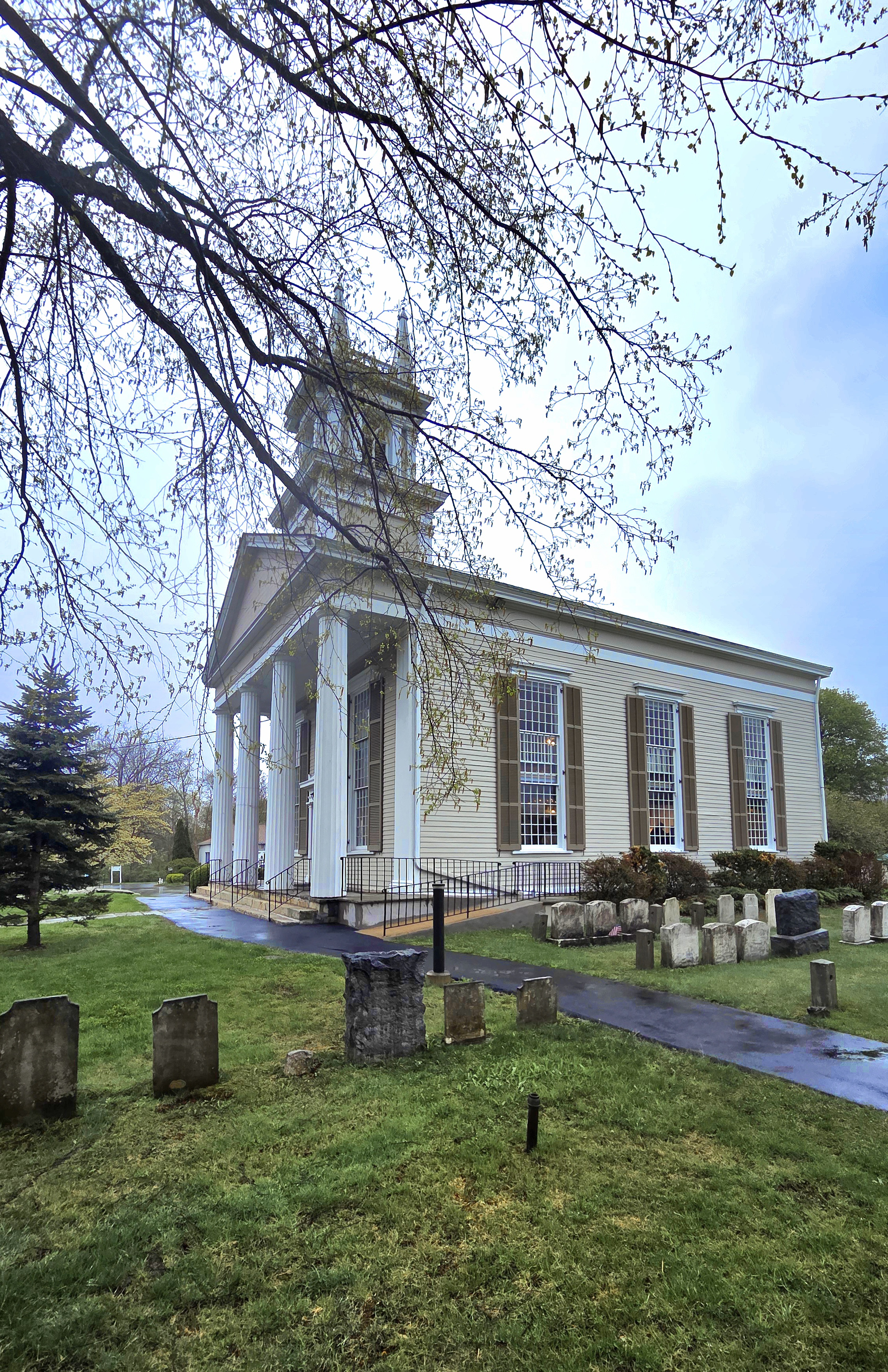
First Presbyterian Church of Yorktown

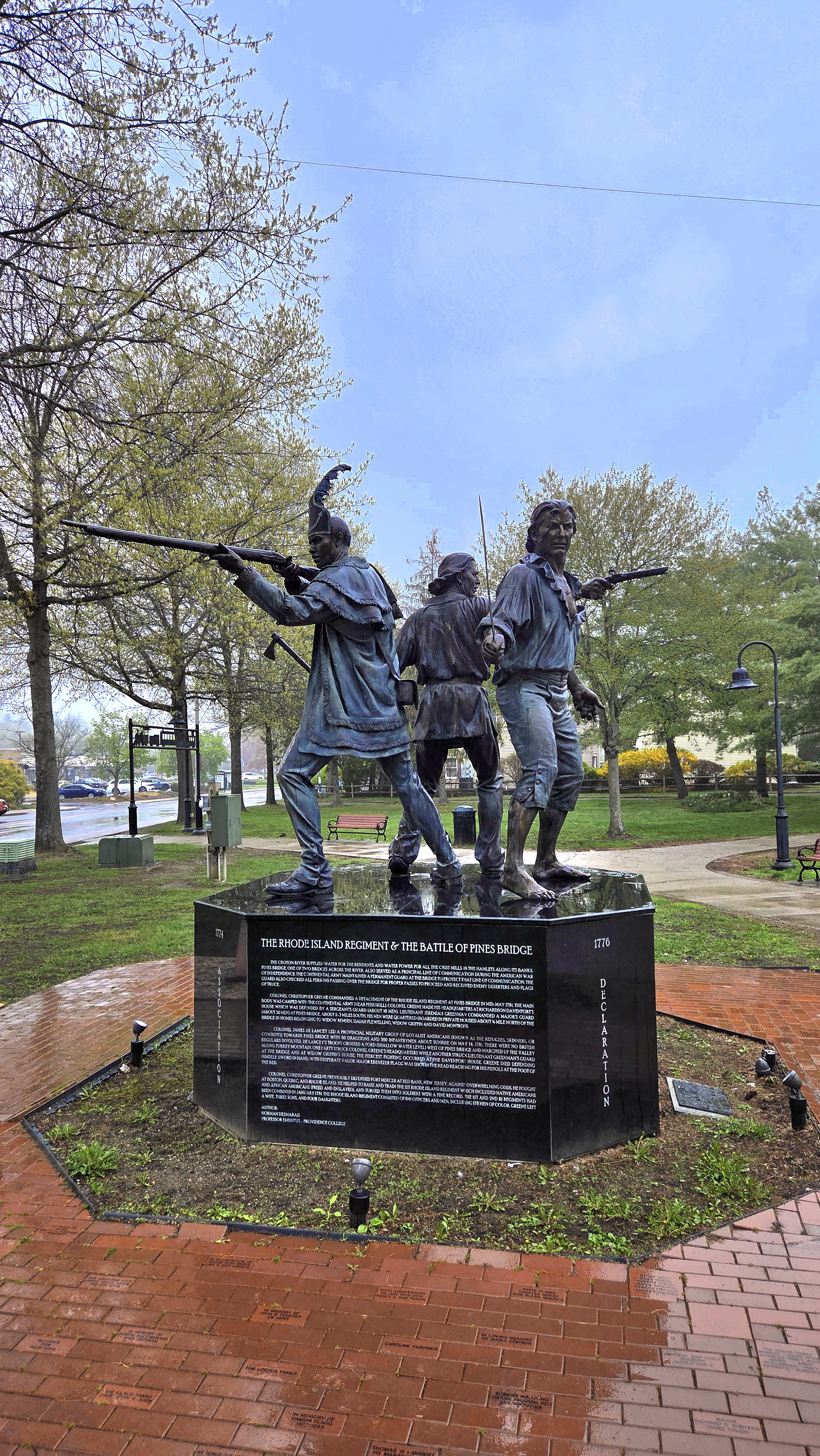
Pines Bridge Monument

Yorktown Heights has many historic landmarks. They include the Hyatt-Hart House, Lane's Tavern, the 1820s Underhill Farmhouse Mansion, and the First Presbyterian Church of Yorktown, one of the region's oldest Presbyterian churches. Graves of Revolutionary War heroes, including Col. Christopher Greene, and the Monument to the 1st Rhode Island Regiment are near the church, in the historic Crompond Presbyterian Burying Ground. Another landmark is the former railroad station, built in 1905, which was a stop on the New York and Putnam Railroad Line (also called the "Old Put"). The Pines Bridge Monument near the station, a bronze sculpture by noted sculptor Thomas Jay Warren, commemorates the 1781 Battle of Pine's Bridge that took place south of what is now Yorktown Heights.

A popular hiking destination is Turkey Mountain, maintained by the Yorktown Land Trust. The North County Trailway is a popular running and bike path that can be accessed from Yorktown Heights.

== Transportation ==
U.S. Route 202 passes through Yorktown Heights. The Taconic State Parkway is nearby, to the west.

Yorktown Heights Railroad Station was closed in 1958, a year before passenger service was abandoned along the New York Central's Putnam Division.

== Education ==
Yorktown Central School District is the area school district.

== Notable people ==
- George Cehanovsky, baritone
- Steve Cohen, magician
- Roy Colsey, professional lacrosse player (Philadelphia Barrage)
- Jonathan de Marte, Israeli-American baseball player
- Susan Faludi, journalist and writer
- Robert Hanssen, Russian Spies residency while in NY who was later arrested in 2001
- Paul W. Jones, U.S. diplomat, Ambassador to Poland (since 2015), Ambassador to Malaysia (2010–2013)
- Andrew Kavovit, actor
- Biff Liff, Broadway theater producer
- Dave Matthews, singer and musician, the Dave Matthews Band
- Rebekah Mercer, director, Mercer Family Foundation
- Alexandria Ocasio-Cortez, U.S. Representative
- Buster Olney, sportswriter
- Karen Olsen Beck, Costa Rican diplomat, politician, and First Lady of Costa Rica (1954–1958, 1970–1974)
- RoseMarie Panio, politician
- Elisabeth Rethberg, soprano
- Alex Robinson, comic book writer and artist
- Mandy Rose, WWE wrestler
- Dave Ross, radio talk show host
- Joel Shulman, jazz pianist
- Rich Silverstein, advertising executive and creative director (Goodby, Silverstein & Partners)
- George Yancopoulos, biomedical scientist
