= Turkey Mountain (New York) =

Hill in New York, United States

Highest point
- Elevation: 235.00 m (771.00 ft)
- Coordinates: 41°14′54″N 73°47′47″W

Geography
- Location: Yorktown Heights

Turkey Mountain is a hill (despite its name) located in Yorktown Heights, New York. The hill is located on a land reserve and is currently maintained by the Yorktown Land Trust. It is 831 feet (253 m) high and covers approximately 125 acres (0.51 km^{2}) of land area.
