= Monument to 1st Rhode Island Regiment =

Monument to the 1st Rhode Island Regiment
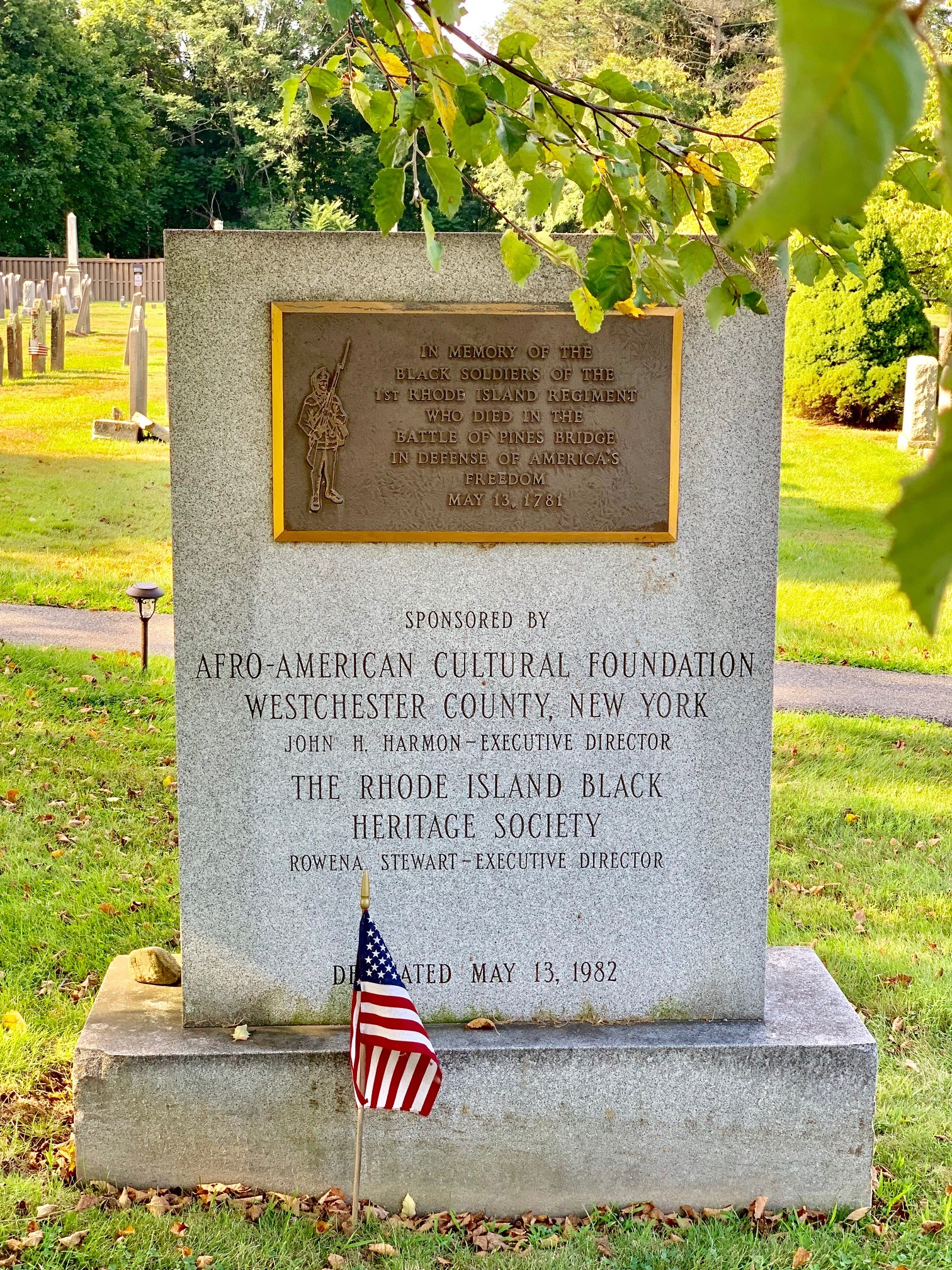
- Monument to the 1st Rhode Island Regiment
- Interactive map of Monument to the 1st Rhode Island Regiment
- Location: 2880 Crompound Road, Yorktown Heights, New York
- Coordinates: 41°17′39.24″N 73°48′31.86″W

The Monument to the 1st Rhode Island Regiment in Yorktown Heights, New York, was erected on May 13, 1982, at the Crompond Presbyterian Burying Ground to commemorate the efforts of an American Revolutionary War unit composed predominantly of black soldiers that fought on May 14, 1781, under the command of Colonel Christopher Greene.

== History ==
The Monument was installed thanks to the civic advocacy of African American historian and Westchester community leader John H. Harmon; Harmon was the founder in 1969 of the Afro-American Cultural Foundation as well as executive director and the monument is a legacy of that institution.

An engraved plaque on a large stone marker calls attention to the patriotism of the First Rhode Island Regiment; 140 out of 225 soldiers were Black, the largest percentage by far in any of the integrated military units.

The Yorktown Heights area was the location of the Battle of Pine's Bridge, a minor yet exceptionally violent engagement during the American Revolutionary War that took place on May 14, 1781. Both commanding officers and between 27 and 45 of their soldiers were killed in the deadly skirmish by members of a Loyalist unit known as De Lancey's Cowboys.

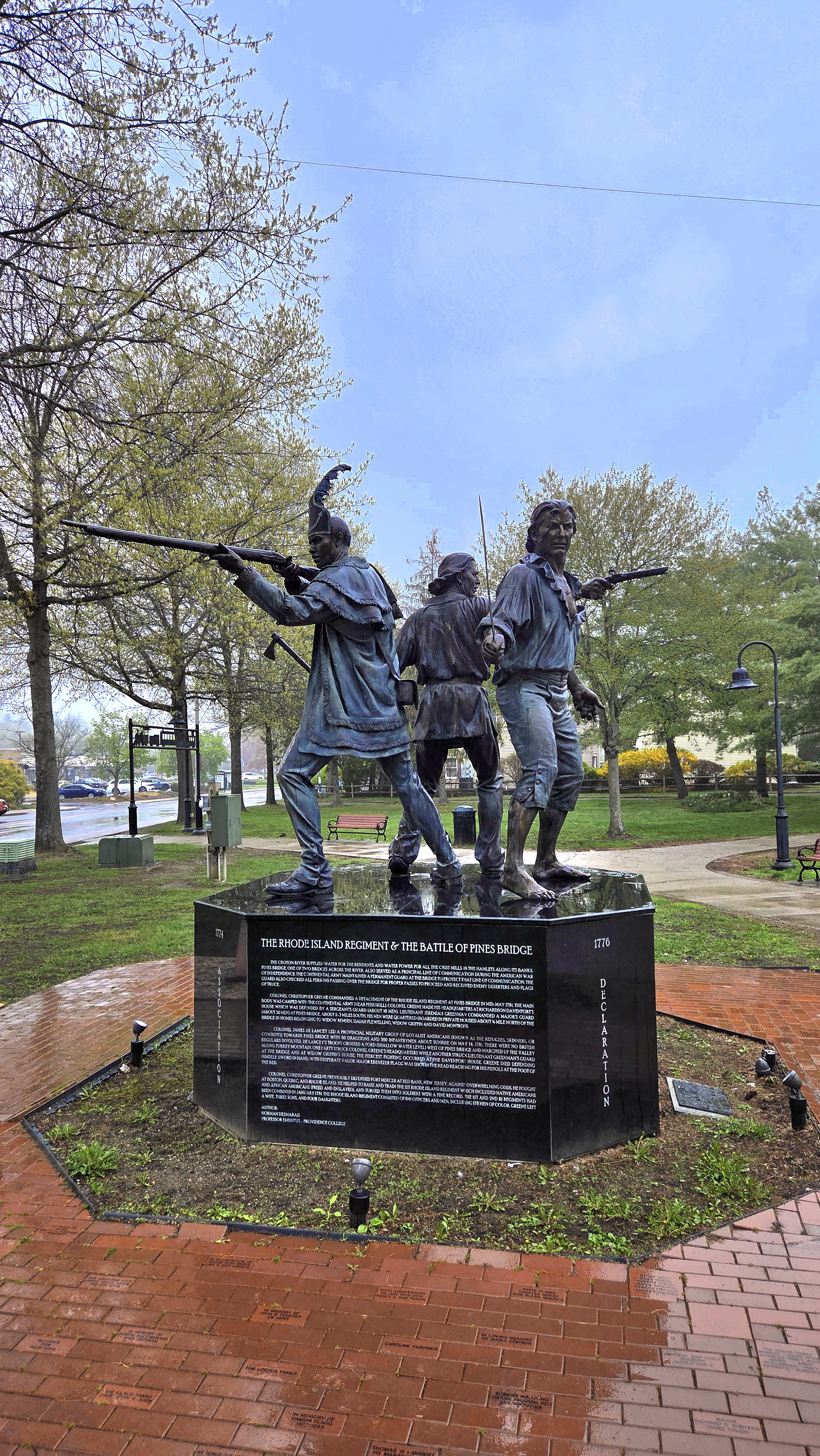
Pines Bridge Monument

The burial location of the soldiers is unknown.The officers, Colonel Greene and Major Flagg, were buried in unmarked graves at the Crompond Presbyterian Burying Ground in Yorktown Heights, about two miles north of the site of their deaths. In 1900, the State of New York erected a large stone marker over their graves. While the white officers had been commemorated with a memorial stone, the soldiers of the integrated unit who died in the battle remained overlooked for 200 years until May 13, 1982, when the Monument to the 1st Rhode Island Regiment was dedicated in the cemetery, next to the commanding officers' graves.

The monument was added to the African American Heritage Trail of Westchester County in 2004 as part of a mission to “preserve and interpret the legacy and contributions that people of African descent have made to the development of our unique American identity.” It was sponsored by the Afro-American Cultural Foundation of Westchester County together with the Rhode Island Black Heritage Society.

In 2018, the Pines Bridge Battle Monument was opened in the center of Yorktown Heights. A heroic sculpture by noted sculptor Thomas Jay Warren depicts three figures—Col. Christopher Greene and two soldiers of his integrated unit—an African American and a Native American.
