= Army of observation =

An army of observation is a military body whose purpose is to monitor a given area or enemy body in preparation for possible hostilities.

Some of the more notable armies of observation include:

- French revolutionary Armée d'Observation, predecessor of the Army of the Danube (1799).
- Third Reserve Army of Observation, a Russian army tasked to monitor the Austrian border in 1811 prior to the French invasion of Russia.
- The New England Army of Observation, which was organized in April 1775 by Massachusetts Bay Colony and the other New England Colonies, in anticipation of hostilities with Great Britain.
- The army of observation at Fort Jesup, Louisiana, United States, which monitored between 1822 and 1845 Texas' transition from Spanish to Mexican control, and to eventual independence
- The Hanoverian Army of Observation which monitored the border prior to the French Invasion of Hanover in 1757
