= Christopher Greene =

American legislator and soldier

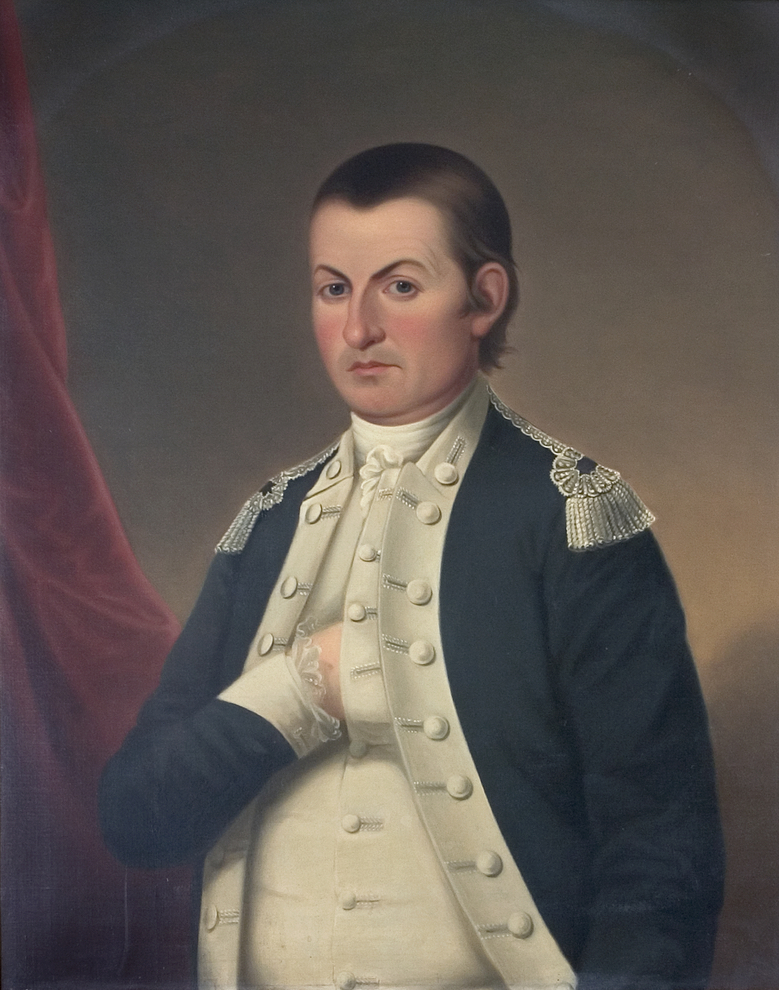
- Born: May 12, 1737; Warwick, Colony of Rhode Island, British America
- Died: May 13 or May 14, 1781 (aged 44) near Yorktown, Westchester County, New York, U.S.
- Relatives: Nathanael Greene (third cousin), Governor William Greene (second cousin), Griffin Greene (brother-in-law)
- Military career
- Allegiance: United States
- Branch: Continental Army
- Service years: 1774–1781
- Rank: Colonel (1776–1781)
- Unit: 1st Rhode Island Regiment
- Conflicts: American Revolutionary War: Battle of Quebec; Battle of Red Bank (1777); Battle of Rhode Island (1778); Battle of Pine's Bridge (1781)

Christopher Greene (May 12, 1737 – May 14, 1781) was an American legislator and soldier. He led the spirited defense of Fort Mercer in the 1777 Battle of Red Bank, and for leading the racially integrated 1st Rhode Island Regiment during the American Revolutionary War, most notably with distinction in the 1778 Battle of Rhode Island. He was killed in May 1781 at the Battle of Pine's Bridge by Loyalist troops.

== Early life and education ==
Greene was born May 12, 1737, at Occupessatuxet, a village in Warwick, Rhode Island, to Judge Phillip Greene and Elizabeth (Wickes) Greene. On May 6, 1757, Greene married his third cousin Anna Lippitt, born November 15, 1735, the daughter of Jeremiah Lippitt and Welthian Greene, both descended from a distinguished Rhode Island colonial family. Jeremiah was Warwick's town clerk from June 1742 to his death in 1776, with the exception of 1775. He was a deputy to the General Assembly for four years, and Assistant five years.

Greene and Anna would have nine children together. When Greene's father died in 1761, Greene inherited the family's mill estate and ran the business until he became an officer in the Continental Army. He served in the Rhode Island Legislature from 1772 to 1774. Greene was chosen a lieutenant of the Kentish Guards 1774.

== American Revolutionary War ==
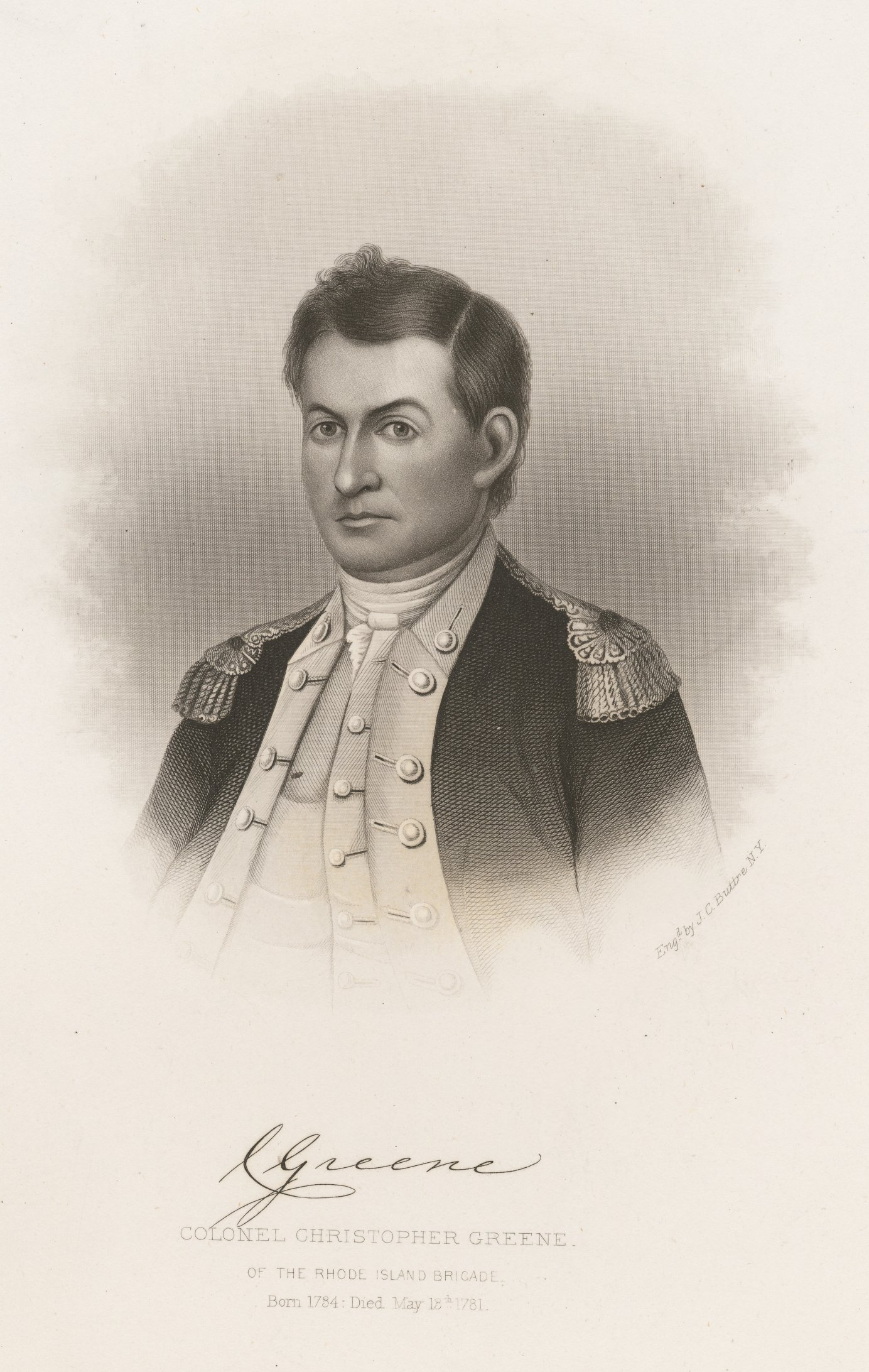
Reproductive engraving of Greene's portrait published in 1865

On May 3, 1775, he was appointed a major in Varnum's Regiment by the Rhode Island legislature. He was given command of a company and marched to Cambridge, Massachusetts and became part of the Army of Observation in support of the rebellion against British rule.

In September 1775, George Washington put Major Greene in charge of a battalion in Cambridge under the command of Colonel Benedict Arnold. Greene's battalion was part of Arnold's expedition through present-day Maine to attack the British garrison at Quebec. In the assault on that city on December 31, 1775, Greene led a detachment of troops, and, after Arnold was wounded, Greene was taken prisoner by the British. He was exchanged after eight months' confinement in August 1776.

=== Battle of Red Bank ===
In June 1776, Greene was promoted to major in the 9th Continental Regiment under Colonel James M. Varnum, in a division which was commanded by his third cousin, General Nathanael Greene. In January 1777, the 9th Continental Regiment was renamed as the 1st Rhode Island Regiment. On 27 February 1777 Greene was promoted to colonel, and placed in command of the regiment, following Varnum's promotion to brigadier general.

In October, Greene was in charge of Fort Mercer at Red Bank in what is now the borough of National Park south of Philadelphia and Trenton in Gloucester County, New Jersey.

Fort Mercer and its Pennsylvania counterpart on the west side of the river, Fort Mifflin, had the mission of defending the Delaware River against British naval movements on the river. After the British captured Philadelphia in September 1777, the forts prevented the Royal Navy from bringing supplies into the city.

On October 22, 1777, Fort Mercer was assaulted by the Hessians under Colonel Carl von Donop, in what came to be called the Battle of Red Bank. Von Donop was eager to avenge the 1776 defeat of Hessian troops by George Washington in the Battle of Trenton. Though supported by gunfire from six Royal Navy warships in the Delaware River, the Hessians were repulsed with heavy loss, and von Donop was mortally wounded. Greene spent the winter of 1777 to 1778 with his regiment at the Continental Army's winter quarters at Valley Forge near Philadelphia.

=== Battle of Rhode Island ===
In early 1778, Colonel Greene returned to the cooler climate of his home state. He struggled to piece together a unit of former slaves, the 1st Rhode Island. When the idea of offering slaves their freedom in return for active service was first suggested, all concerned believed the plan would help solve the problem of finding Continental recruits. The Rhode Island General Assembly voted "that every able-bodied Negro, Mulatto, or Indian Man Slave, in this State, may enlist into either of the said two Battalions to serve during the Continuance of the present War with Great-Britain: That every Slave, so enlisting, shall be entitled to, and receive, all the Bounties, Wages, and Encouragements, allowed by the Continental Congress, to any Soldier enlisting into their Service.”

The small population of 3,331 blacks and Indians, however, could not support the effort adequately. Fewer than two hundred soldiers were recruited. Finding the scheme expensive and impractical, the legislators reversed themselves. "No Negroe, Mulatto, nor Indian Man Slave will be permitted to enlist in the Continental battalions after 10 June 1778." Greene and his officers proceeded to train the black infantrymen who had already signed on. All heard the news that a French fleet was on the way, and many were looking forward to some serious fighting in the near future.

The decision to stop recruitment also reflected how controversial black regiments were and recognition that, as fighting moved to the Southern colonies, the white Southern slave owners would not tolerate the presence of black regiments.

Colonel Greene and his regiment were detached for special service in Rhode Island, and he was placed under the command of General John Sullivan. General Sullivan, whose headquarters were in Providence, was charged with the task of containing 4,000 British and Hessian troops occupying Newport on Aquidneck Island. For this purpose he had only a brigade of Rhode Island state troops, and several thousand as yet unmobilized militia. In early July 1778 orders from General Washington changed Sullivan's mission from defense to attack and thrust the quiet Rhode Island sector into the forefront of the war.

The Battle of Rhode Island commenced on August 29, 1778. Colonel Greene temporarily commanded a brigade in the center of the American order of battle. Greene's "Black Regiment", now under General Nathanael Greene's longtime friend, Maj. Samuel Ward Jr, held the far right of the American line. This regiment served with distinction, praised by the allied French officers for repulsing attacks by Hessian soldiers. Due to losses on the eastern flank, General Sullivan was forced to withdraw all American forces from the field, leaving the British forces still in control of Aquidneck Island.

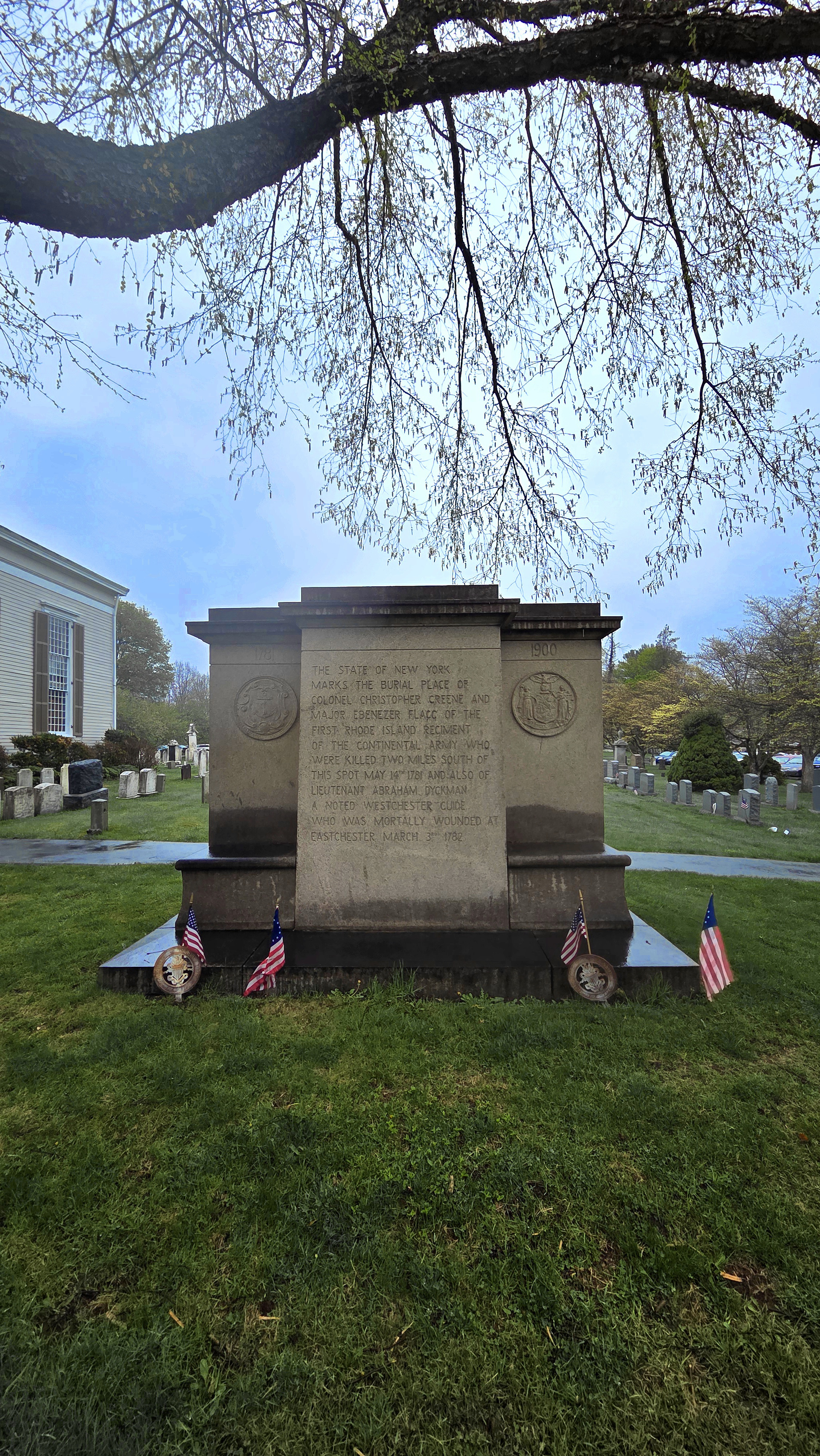
Burial Place Marker in Yorktown Heights

== Death ==
Greene and his second-in-command, Major Ebenezer Flagg, along with at least six Black soldiers (two others later died of their wounds) were killed on May 14, 1781, when a Loyalist unit known as De Lancey's Cowboys surrounded Greene's headquarters on the Croton River in Westchester County, New York. The engagement would later become known as the Battle of Pine's Bridge. The Black soldiers were reported to have "defended their beloved Col. Greene so well that it was only over their dead bodies that the enemy reached and murdered him." An account of the attack claimed that Greene's body "was found in the woods, about a mile distant from his tent, cut, and mangled in the most shocking way." This brutality is often attributed to the Loyalists' particular hatred of Greene for commanding an integrated unit that included many Black soldiers. There is an eyewitness account of the desire for revenge expressed by Captain Gilbert Totten, one of De Lancey's Cowboys, after he had been briefly detained near Pine's Bridge several weeks before the battle and placed under a guard of Black soldiers.

== Legacy ==
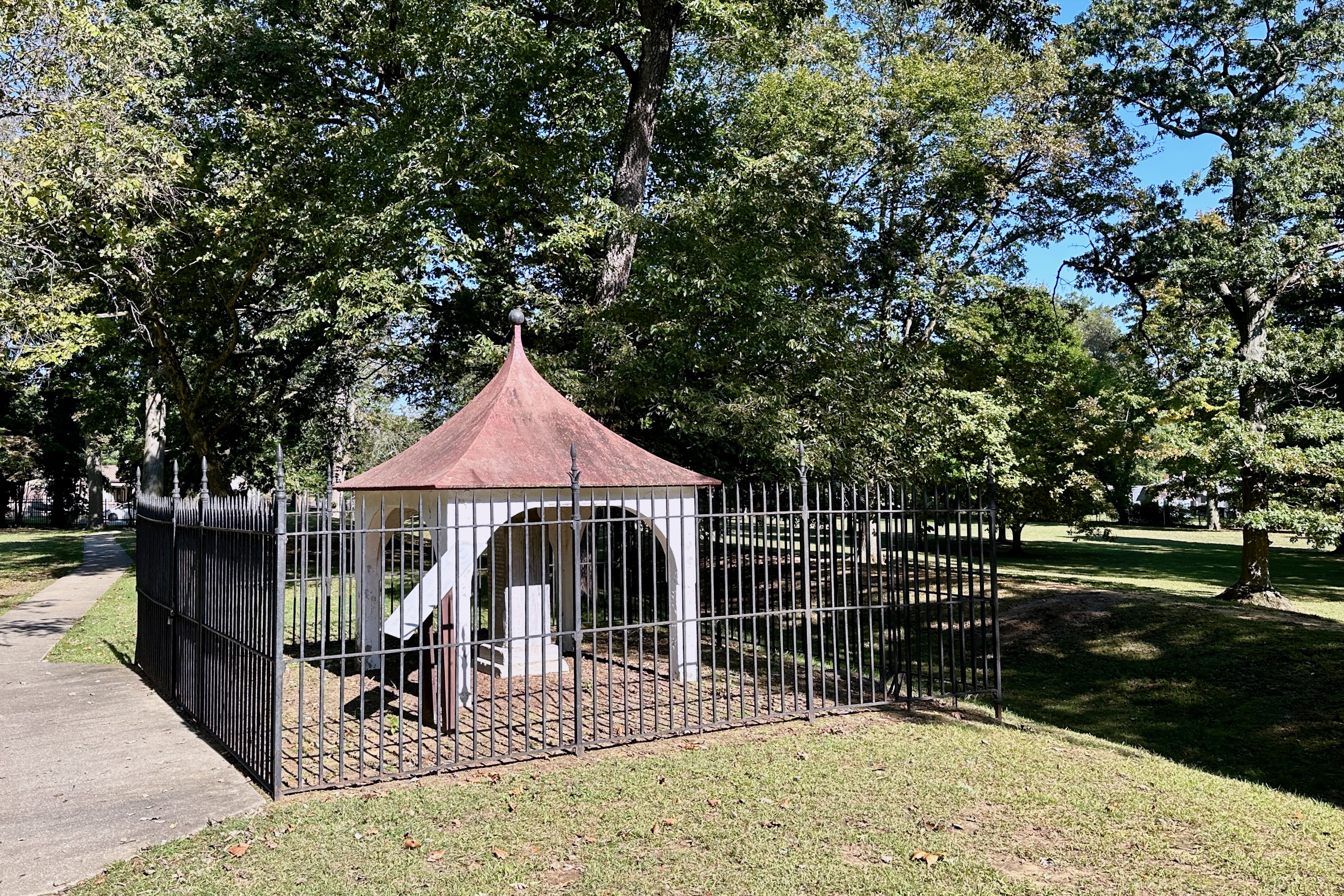
The 1829 monument to Greene at the Red Bank Battlefield

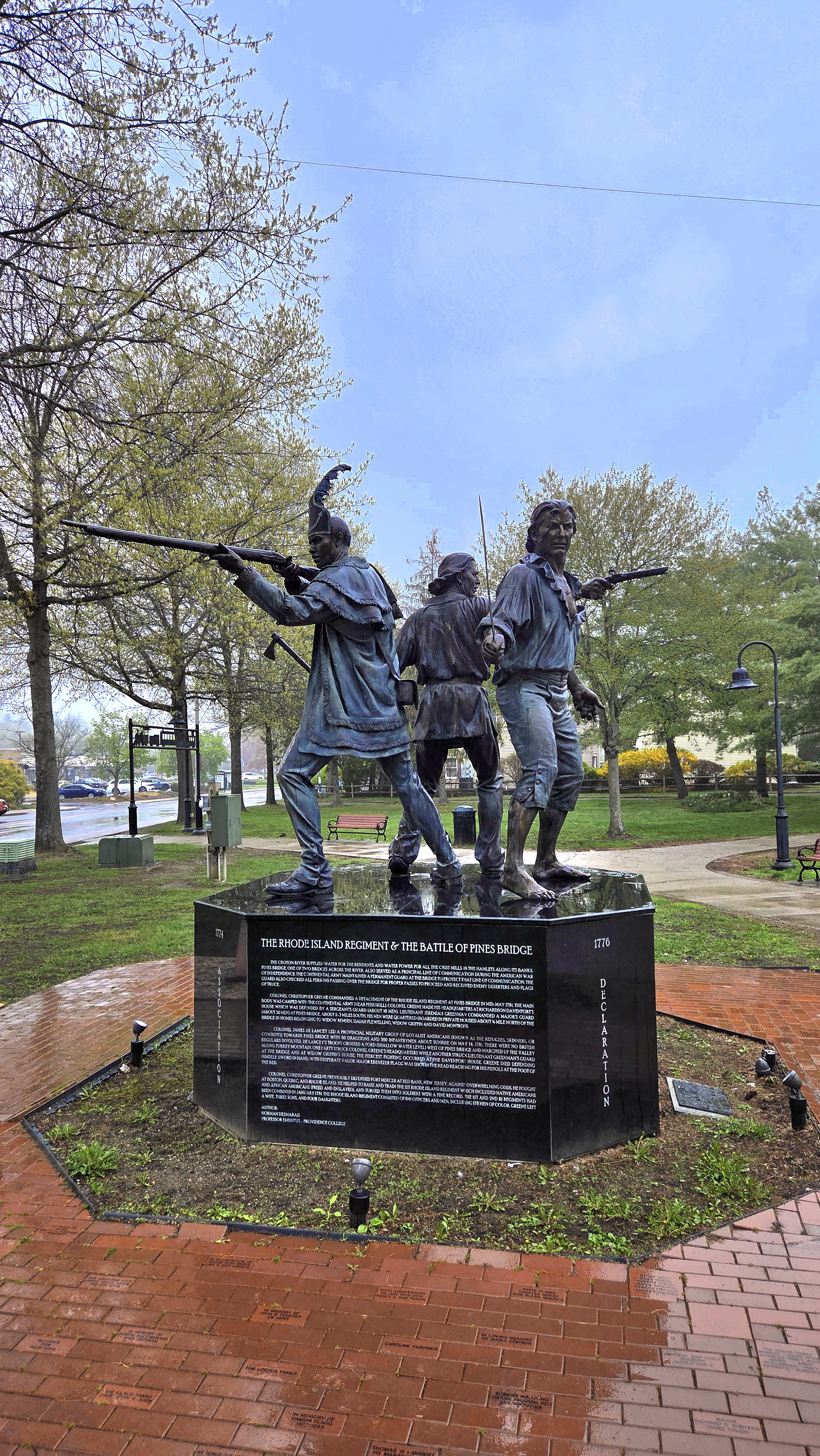
The 2018 Pines Bridge Monument in Yorktown Heights

Congress voted Greene a sword, which in 1786 was presented to his son by Secretary of War Henry Knox.

Colonel Greene and Major Flagg were buried in unmarked graves at the Crompond Presbyterian Burying Ground in Yorktown Heights, about two miles north of the site of their deaths. In 1900, the State of New York erected a large stone marker over their graves. Nearby, the Monument to the 1st Rhode Island Regiment was installed in 1982, honoring the memory of the African American soldiers who died in battle and whose burial location is unknown; this memorial was added to the African American Heritage Trail of Westchester County in 2004. In the center of Yorktown Heights, the Pines Bridge Monument was dedicated in 2018. A heroic bronze sculpture by noted sculptor Thomas Jay Warren depicts three figures—Col. Christopher Greene and two of his soldiers—an African American and a Native American.

The Red Bank Battlefield Park in National Park, New Jersey, features two monuments memorializing Greene: a smaller one, erected in October 1829 by volunteers from New Jersey and Pennsylvania to honor the "patriotism and gallantry of Lieut. Colonel Christopher Greene who with 400 men defeated the Hessian army of 2000 troops," and a large, 75-foot tall granite obelisk topped with a bronze statue of a Revolutionary War soldier, dedicated in 1906, that commemorates the overall battle and the American victory led by Greene.

A fine portrait of Colonel Greene by James Sullivan Lincoln hangs in the John Hay Library of Brown University in Providence, Rhode Island.

== See also ==
- 1st Rhode Island Regiment
- Battle of Pine's Bridge

== Sources ==
- Clarke, Louise Brownell. The Greenes of Rhode Island with Historical Records of English Ancestry, 166-168. New York: Knickerbocker Press, 1903.
- Cowell, Benjamin. Spirit of '76 in Rhode Island, 263. Boston: A.J. Wright, Printer, 1850.
- Dearden, Paul F. The Rhode Island Campaign of 1778: Inauspicious Dawn of Alliance. Providence: The Rhode Island Publications Society, 1980.
- Raymond, Marcius Denison Col. Christopher Greene of Rhode Island read before the Rhode Island Historical Society, April 26, 1902. Tarrytown, New York: Published by the Author by Request. (1902).
- Ryun, Jim. "Heroes Among Us: Deep Within Each of Us Lies the Heart of a Hero," Chapter 3, Christopher Greene. Destiny Image Publishers, 2002.
- Sweet, John Wood. Bodies Politic: Negotiating Race in the American North, 1730-1830. Philadelphia: University of Pennsylvania Press, 2003
