= Battle of Pine's Bridge =

1781 battle

Coordinates: 41.196°N 73.873°W

- Part of the American Revolutionary War
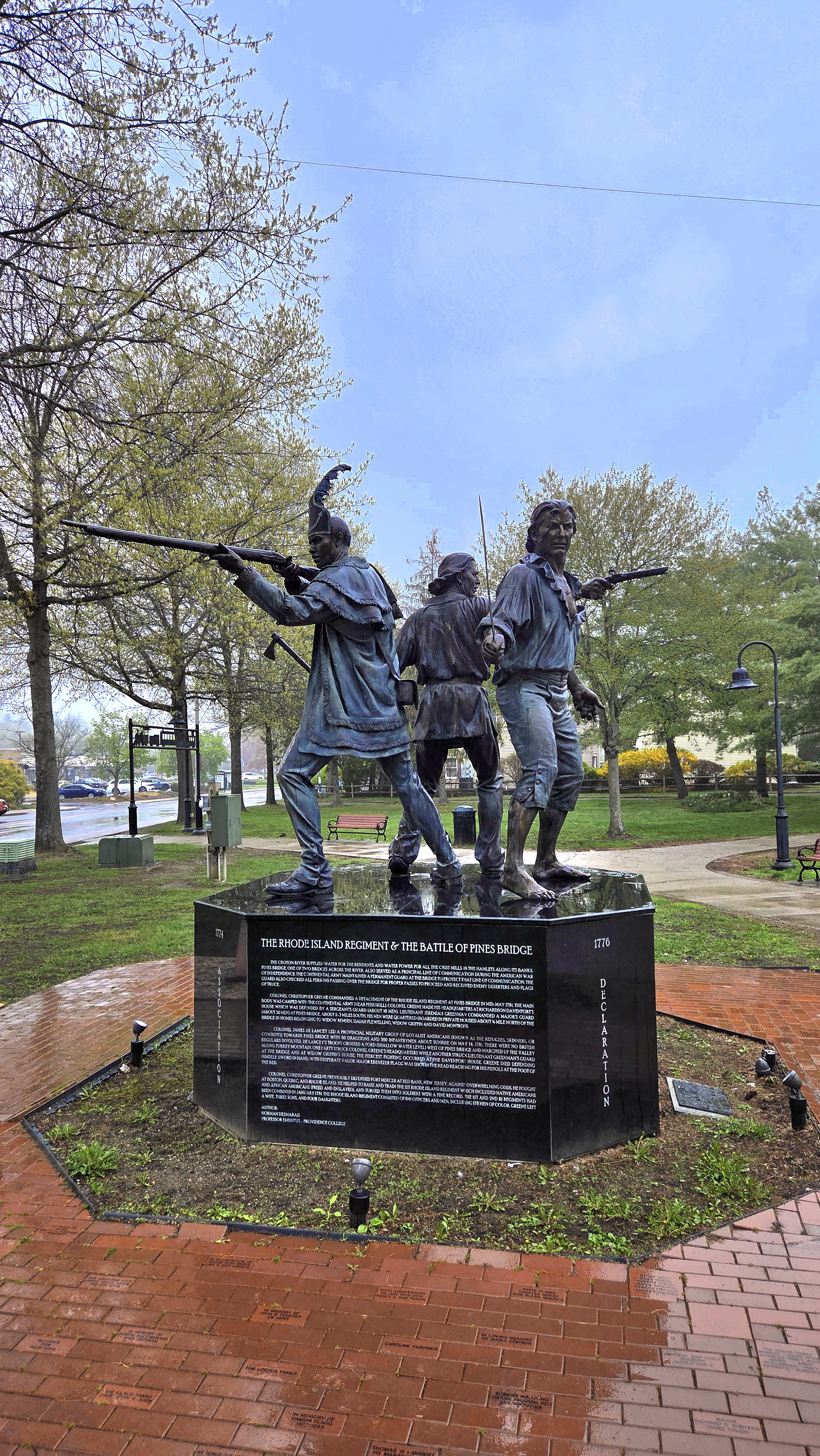
- Pines Bridge Monument in Yorktown Heights
| Date | May 14, 1781 |
| Location | Yorktown, New York |
| Result | British victory |

Belligerents
| United States | Great Britain |

Commanders and leaders
| (United States) Christopher Greene † | (Kingdom of Great Britain) James DeLancey |

Strength
| | 140 infantry 60 Cavalry |

Casualties and losses
| 31 dead and 21 taken prisoners | Unknown |

The Battle of Pine's Bridge (also known as the Massacre at Pines Bridge) was a minor yet exceptionally violent engagement during the American Revolutionary War, near the town of Yorktown, New York, on May 14, 1781. It was one of the largest raids conducted by Loyalist forces into the infamous Neutral Ground of Westchester County and is considered one of the bloodiest small-unit actions of the war.

In the early morning hours, a Loyalist military unit, De Lancey's Cowboys, surprised an American Patriot defensive position at the Davenport House (or Davenport Inn), guarding the Pine's Bridge crossing of the Croton River. As the sole crossing over the river, the bridge served as a critical, strategic artery for communication and supply lines of the Patriot forces. It was guarded by the 1st Rhode Island Regiment (which had many African American and some indigenous soldiers) along with detached soldiers of the Massachusetts Continental Line and the New Hampshire Continental Line on the north bank of the Croton River.

Colonel Christopher Greene, the regiment's commander, and Major Ebenezer Flagg, Greene's second-in-command, were killed in the action, along with at least six African American soldiers of the 1st Rhode Island Regiment (two more later died of their wounds). The Black soldiers were reported to have "defended their beloved Col. Greene so well that it was only over their dead bodies that the enemy reached and murdered him." An account of the attack claimed that Greene's body "was found in the woods, about a mile distant from his tent, cut, and mangled in the most shocking way." This brutality is often attributed to the Loyalists' particular hatred of Greene for commanding an integrated unit which included many Black soldiers. There is an eyewitness account of the desire for revenge expressed by Captain Gilbert Totten, one of De Lancey's Cowboys, after he had been briefly detained near Pine's Bridge several weeks before the battle and placed under a guard of Black soldiers.

The battle’s death records are incomplete; various reports suggest that between 27 and 45 men were killed; a lieutenant, surgeon, and dozens of others were taken prisoners. The captured freedmen were allegedly transported to the British West Indies to be sold back into slavery.

Colonel Greene and Major Flagg were buried in unmarked graves at the Crompond Presbyterian Burying Ground in Yorktown Heights, about two miles north of the site of their deaths. In 1900, the State of New York erected a large stone marker over their graves. The plaque on the stone also commemorates Lieutenant Abraham Dyckman, a noted Westchester guide who was mortally wounded in 1782, during one of the Patriots' subsequent raids on De Lancey's headquarters.

While the white officers had been commemorated with a memorial stone, the soldiers of the integrated unit who died in the battle and whose burial location is unknown remained overlooked for 200 years until May 13, 1982, when the Monument to the 1st Rhode Island Regiment was dedicated in the cemetery, next to the commanding officers' graves. This memorial was added to the African American Heritage Trail of Westchester County in 2004.

The original Davenport House still exists (it is a private residence). The historic 18th-century Pine's Bridge, along with the surrounding village, was submerged at the turn of the 20th century during the creation of the New Croton Reservoir. In 2018, the Pines Bridge Monument was dedicated in the center of Yorktown Heights. A heroic sculpture by noted sculptor Thomas Jay Warren depicts three figures—Col. Christopher Greene and two of his soldiers—an African American and a Native American.
