= First Presbyterian Church, Yorktown, New York =

Historic church in New York, United States

First Presbyterian Church of Yorktown
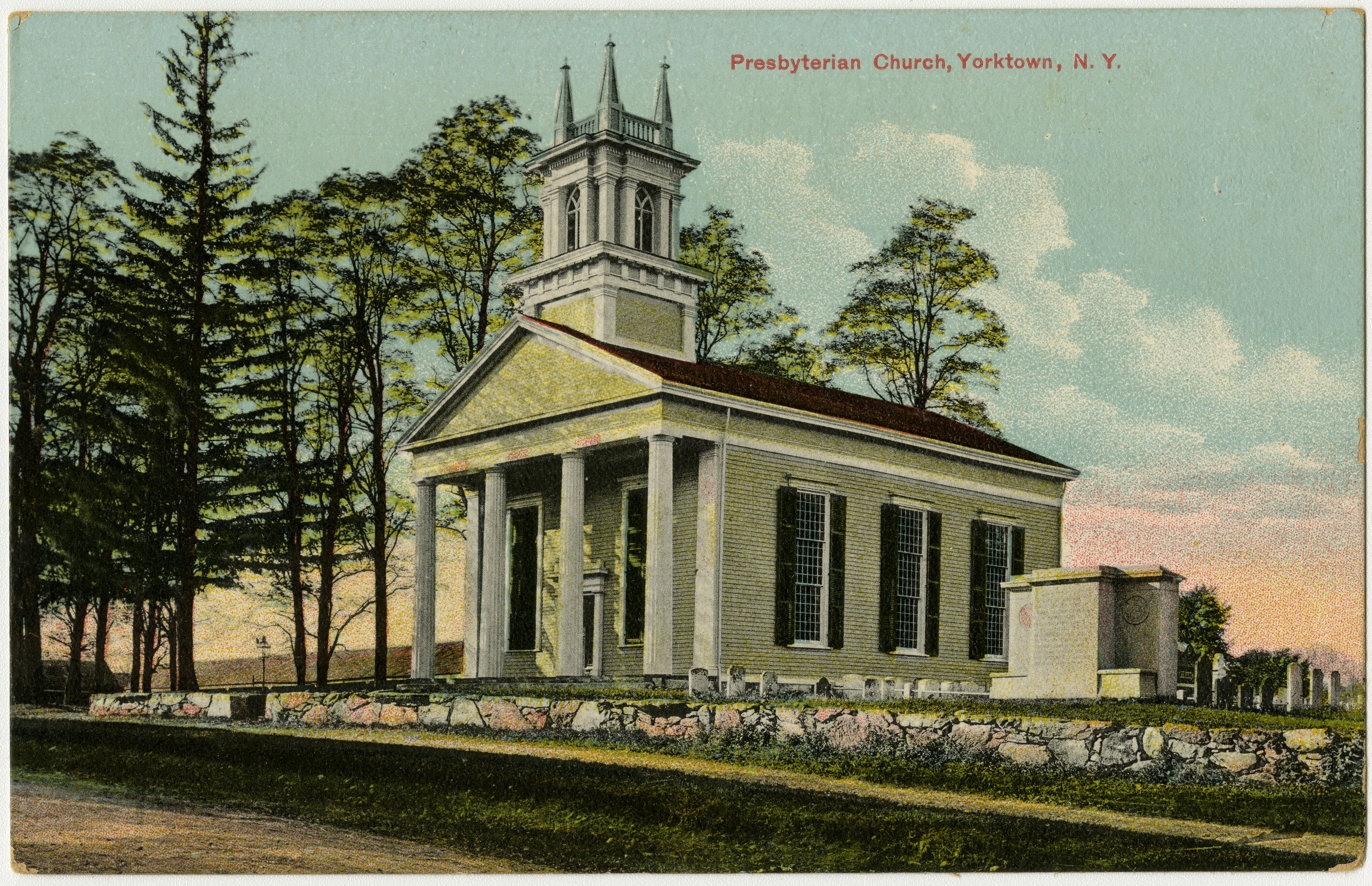
- The church on a historic postcard

Religion
- Affiliation: Presbyterian

Location
- Location: 2880 Crompond Road, Yorktown Heights, NY, US

Architecture
- Style: Greek Revival
- Completed: 1840
- Materials: Wood

Website
- fpcyorktown.org

The First Presbyterian Church of Yorktown is a Presbyterian church in Yorktown Heights, New York. The current church building is the third in the history of the congregation, completed in 1840.

== History ==
The congregation dates back to 1730 when the area was part of Van Cortlandt Manor. A meeting house was built in 1738, and a first resident pastor led the congregation from 1761. During the Revolutionary War, the church was used as barracks. It was destroyed by British troops in June 1779. A second church was built in 1785. A third church in the same style replaced it in 1840.

The Crompond Presbyterian Burying Ground (also known as the Burying Ground at Crompond) is the historic cemetery attached to the First Presbyterian Church of Yorktown. Established in the mid-18th century, it is a significant historical site due to its role as the final resting place for early Westchester settlers as well as for Revolutionary War heroes Colonel Christopher Greene, Major Ebenezer Flagg, and Lieutenant Abraham "Brom" Dyckman, as well as the location of the Monument to 1st Rhode Island Regiment.

== Gallery ==
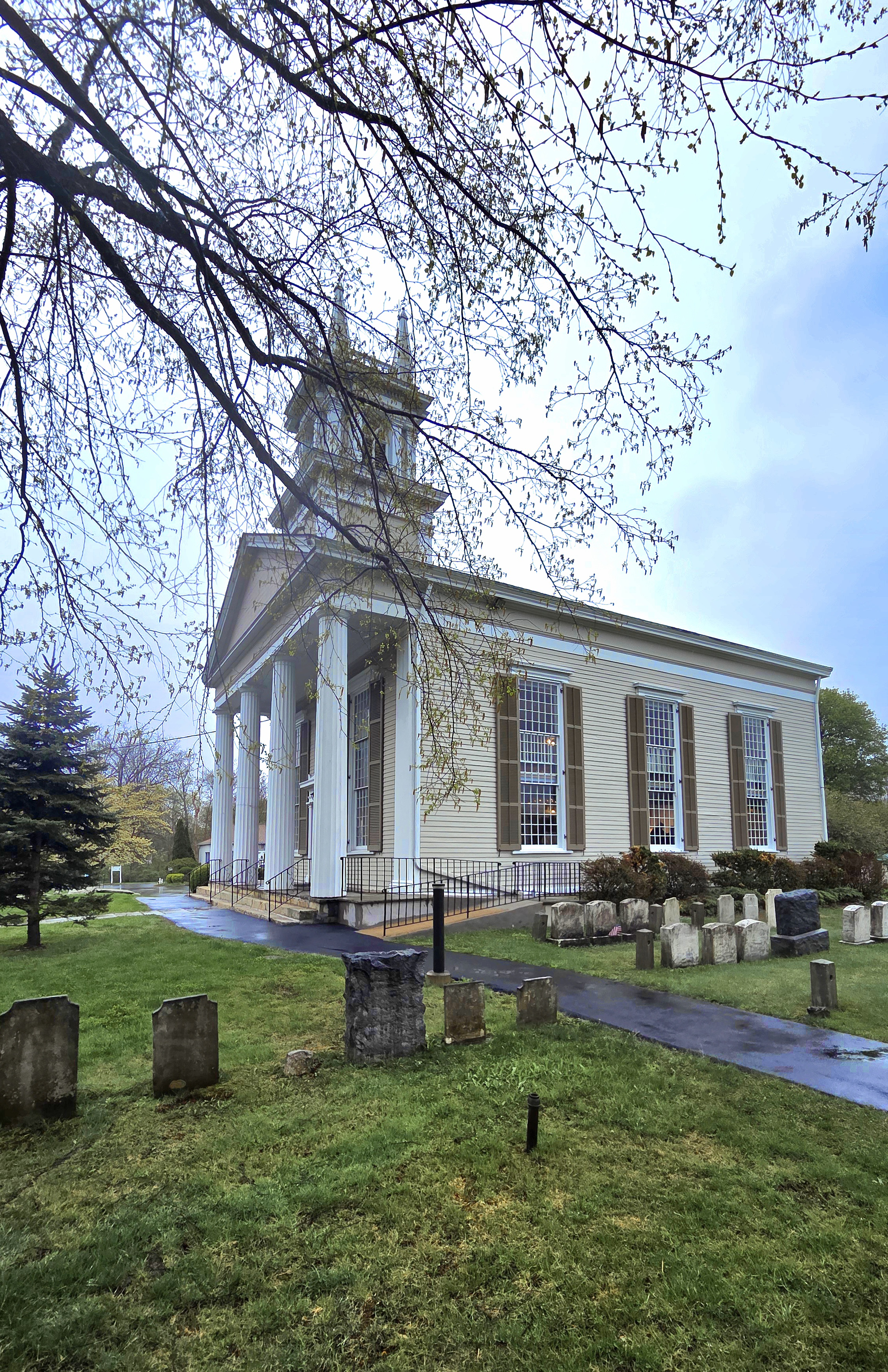
First Presbyterian Church in 2026

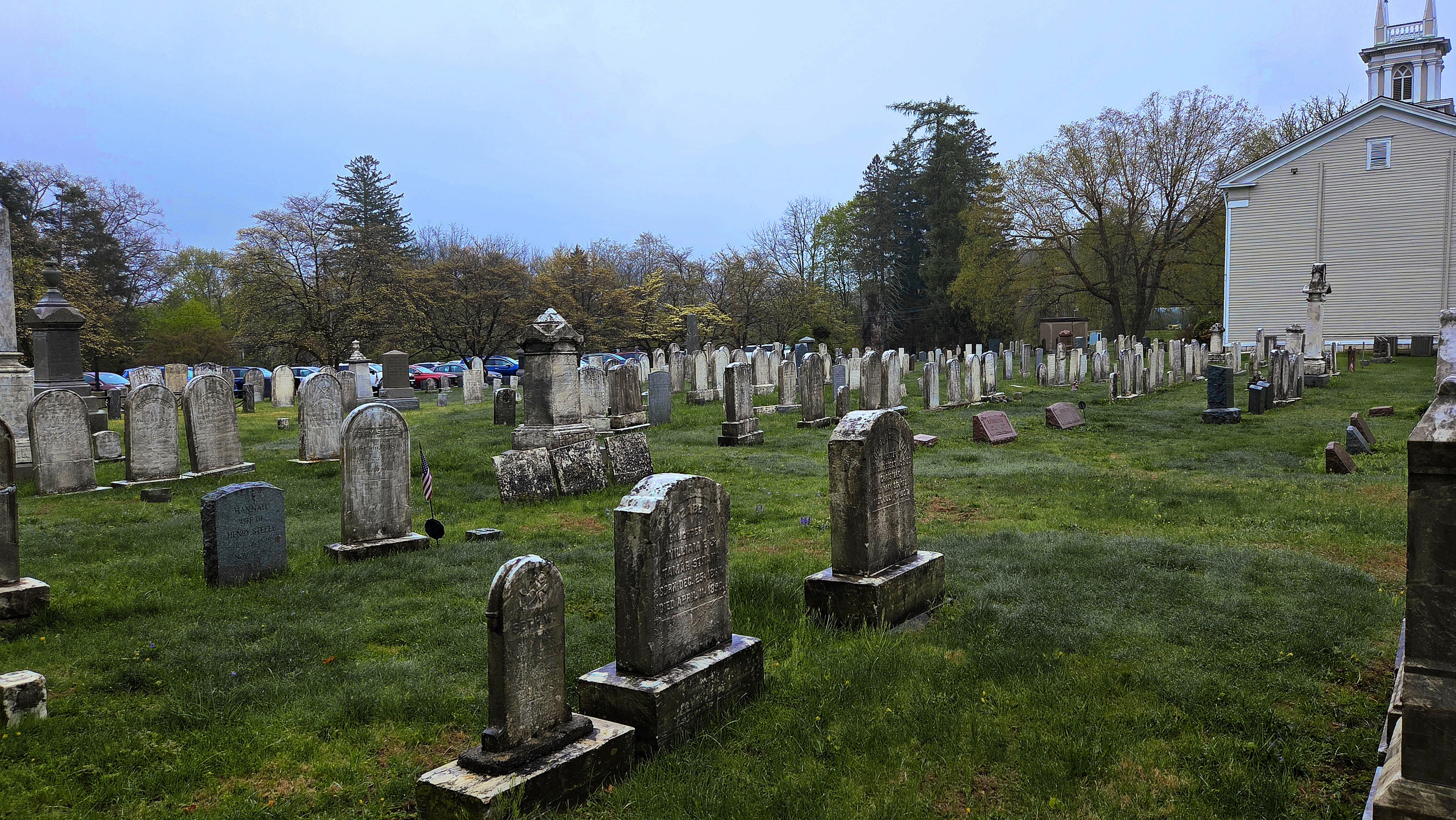
Crompond Presbyterian Burying Ground

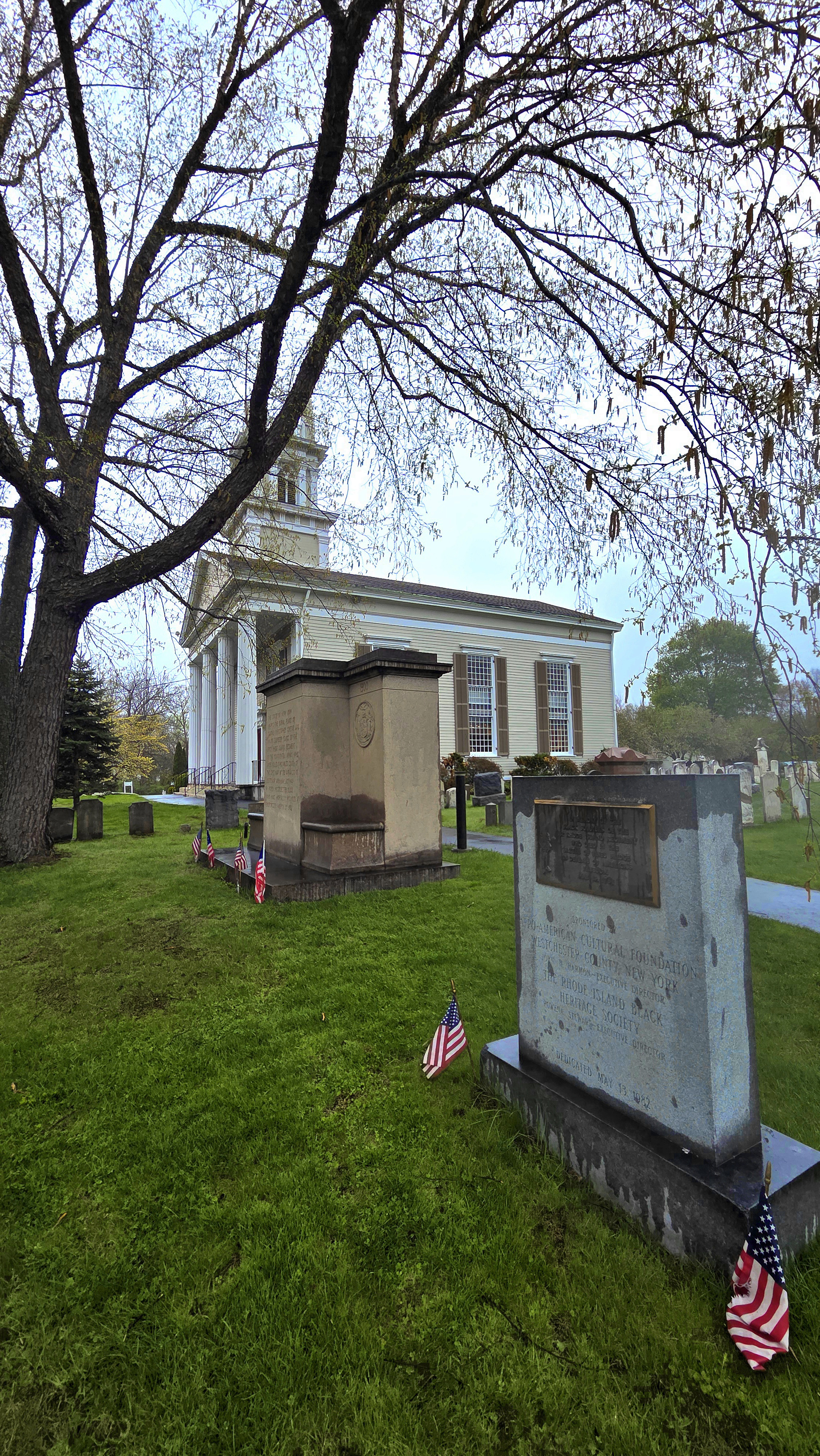
Revolutionary War grave and Monument to 1st Rhode Island Regiment
