= Neutral Ground of Westchester County in the Revolutionary War =

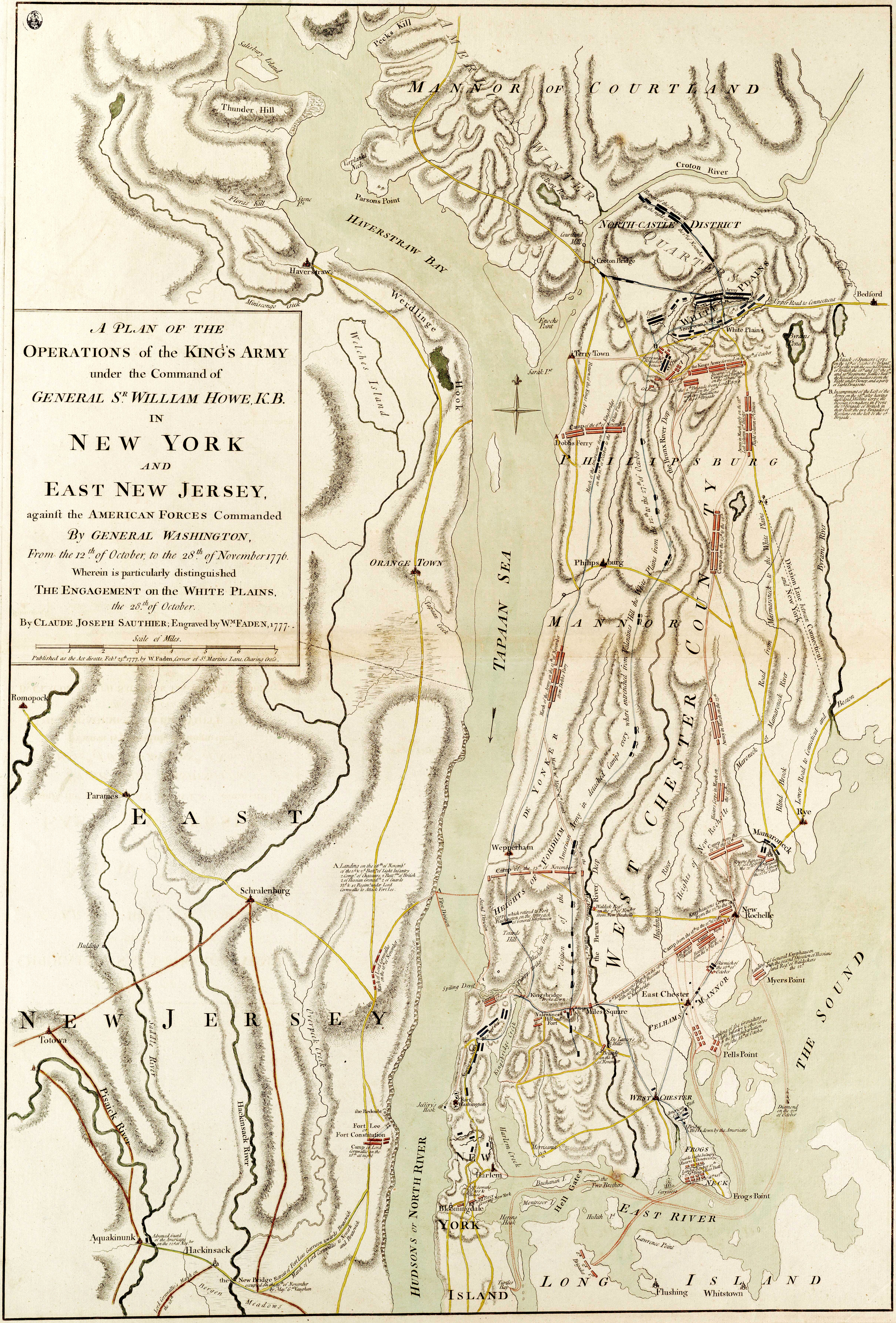
Map showing British army movements in Westchester County and eastern New Jersey between Oct. 12 and Nov. 28, 1777

Westchester County, New York (which at the time also included all of present-day Bronx), played a unique role in the American Revolutionary War. From late 1776 to the end of the War in 1783, much of Westchester was a notorious no-man's land, known as the Neutral Ground, between the British Army and its auxiliaries on one side and the American Patriot forces on the other. Only the northernmost part of the county remained under more stable, though still contested, American control.

There were other areas during the Revolutionary War that shared similar characteristics or were locally referred to by the same name, such as northern New Jersey, southwestern Fairfield County, Connecticut, parts of the Mohawk Valley, and regions along the southern frontier. None of these areas, however, was exposed to such a long period of high-intensity conflict and lawlessness as Westchester. In his seminal work, Westchester County during the American Revolution, 1775-1783, historian Otto Hufeland writes:

In these seven years and four months, Westchester County was never free from the enemy—for every week and perhaps every day, it could furnish a record of bloodshed, either in open fight or in atrocious misdeed of sneaking robbers, and the strain of consuming anxiety was never absent from its people. They fought longer and suffered more than any other community in all the thirteen colonies...

== The Armies ==
The first bloodshed of the war in Westchester took place on August 29, 1776, in Mamaroneck: Loyalist William Lounsbery (also spelled Lounsberry and Lounsbury), who was recruiting soldiers for the British side, was attacked and killed by a group of Patriots. Later that year, after a strategically important skirmish at Pell's Point, a major battle between the British Army, led by General William Howe, and the Continental Army, commanded by General George Washington, was fought at White Plains, in the heart of Westchester. The Battle of White Plains (October 28, 1776) was the last opportunity for the British to trap Washington's army and potentially end the American rebellion in its first year. While a tactical victory for Britain, the battle's long-term significance lies in Washington's ability to preserve the Continental Army and keep the Revolutionary cause alive.

Following the Battle of White Plains, the Continental Army was forced to retreat north. Its primary headquarters was established north of Peekskill at Continental Village, just outside the northern Westchester border. The British were headquartered in New York City, controlling the entire island of Manhattan. The heavily contested, roughly 15-by-30-mile (150-square-mile) "neutral" zone between the permanent defensive lines of the two armies spanned from the Croton River down to the British forward outposts in present-day Bronx neighborhoods of Kingsbridge and Morrisania; it encompassed almost all of Westchester.

Notable military engagements in the Neutral Ground during the war included the skirmishes at Mamaroneck, Edgar's Lane, Pound Ridge, Young's House, Pine's Bridge, and Van Cortlandt's Woods. The Royal Navy frequently used its warships in the Hudson River to support land operations in Westchester; historical markers along the Westchester coastline commemorate the Action at Tarrytown, the Defense of Teller’s Point, and other naval engagements.

In July-August 1781, both the Continental Army and the allied French army under Jean-Baptiste de Rochambeau marched through Westchester before joining forces at Dobbs Ferry. The combined Philipsburg Encampment of the two armies stretched for miles from North Castle/Mount Kisco (east) to the Hudson River, and from the Croton River (north) toward White Plains and Dobbs Ferry. Rochambeau's army was headquartered at the Odell House in present-day Hartsdale, while George Washington's headquarters were located near present-day Ardsley High School. The joint encampment was a key strategic point for launching the Yorktown campaign.

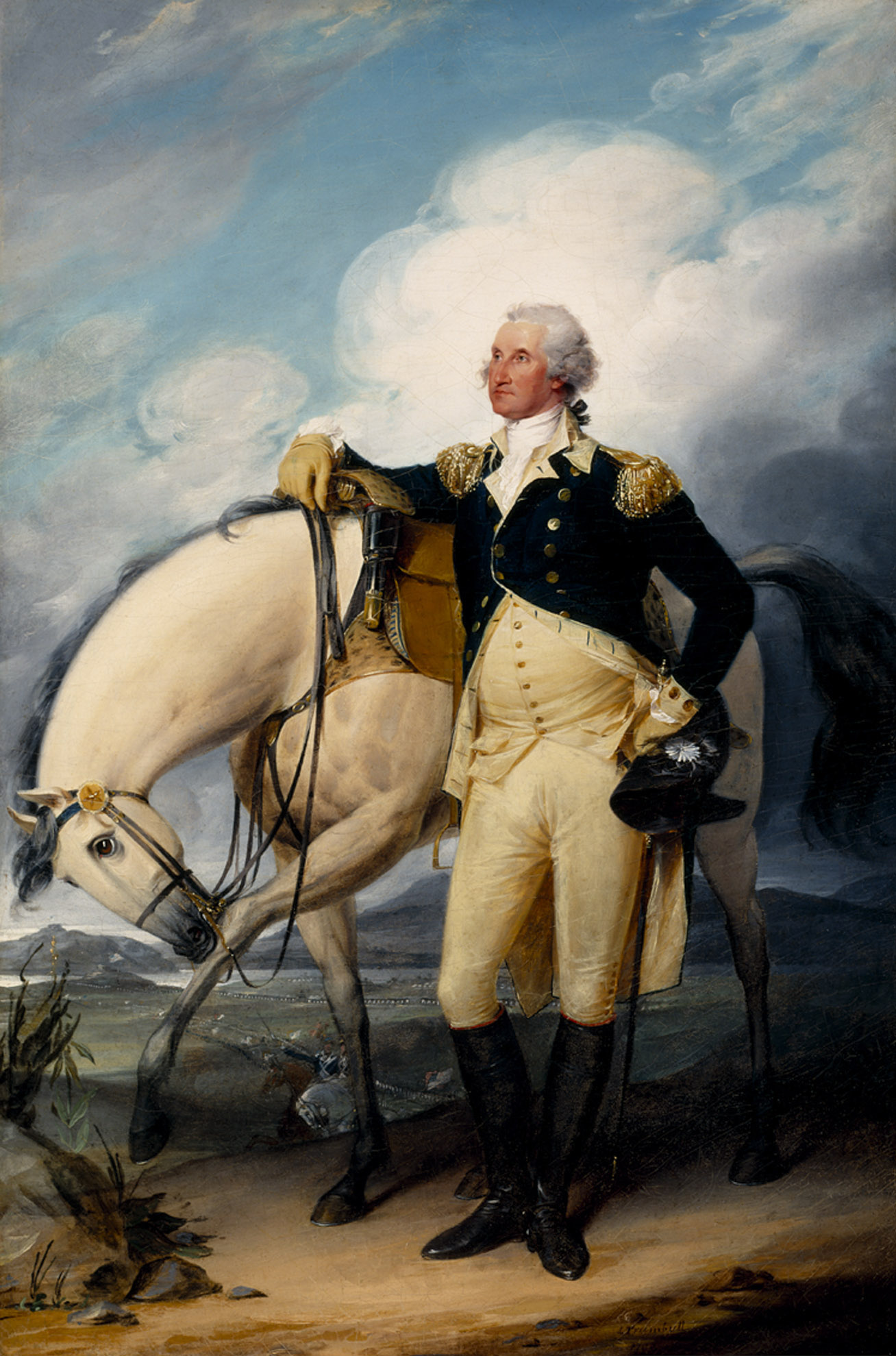
Washington at Verplanck's Point by John Trumbull (1790)

At the outset of the Philipsburg Encampment, on July 3, Washington and Rochambeau attempted a secret night operation to seize British outposts at Kingsbridge. The attempt failed. Later that month, Washington issued an order "For Reconnoitering the Enemy's Post at the North end of York Island and the vicinity of it." This reconnaissance-in-force against British-held New York City was conducted on July 21-23, 1781, and became known as the Grand Reconnaissance. It involved between 4,000 and 5,000 American and French troops who marched south on separate local roads, including the Saw Mill River Road and the Tuckahoe Road. While Washington and Rochambeau’s soldiers paraded before the British lines and conducted feint attacks on the British works, the French military engineers mapped out enemy fortifications. The results of the Grand Reconnaissance were conclusive: the British used their five years in Manhattan to heavily fortify the city, and attacking it would have been a disaster. On August 19, 1781, the Continental Army broke camp and assembled in Dobbs Ferry. After being "paraded for the march," the troops moved north on Broadway toward the Hudson River crossing at King's Ferry on Verplanck's Point in northwestern Westchester. From there, they would cross the river to Stony Point and embark on their southward march to Yorktown, Virginia.

Parts of the Continental Army marched through Westchester County again in 1782 during their return to the Hudson Highlands from the Yorktown campaign. In August 1782, Washington moved approximately 8,000 men by boat from West Point down the Hudson River to Verplanck's Point. This move was specifically planned to meet the French as they marched north from Virginia. The two armies reunited at Verplanck's Point in September 1782. This deployment kept the Continental Army closer to British-occupied New York City while they waited for final peace negotiations to conclude. On September 14, 1782, Washington staged a review of the Continental Army at Verplanck's Point as an honor for the departing Rochambeau and his French troops.

== Loyalists and Patriots ==
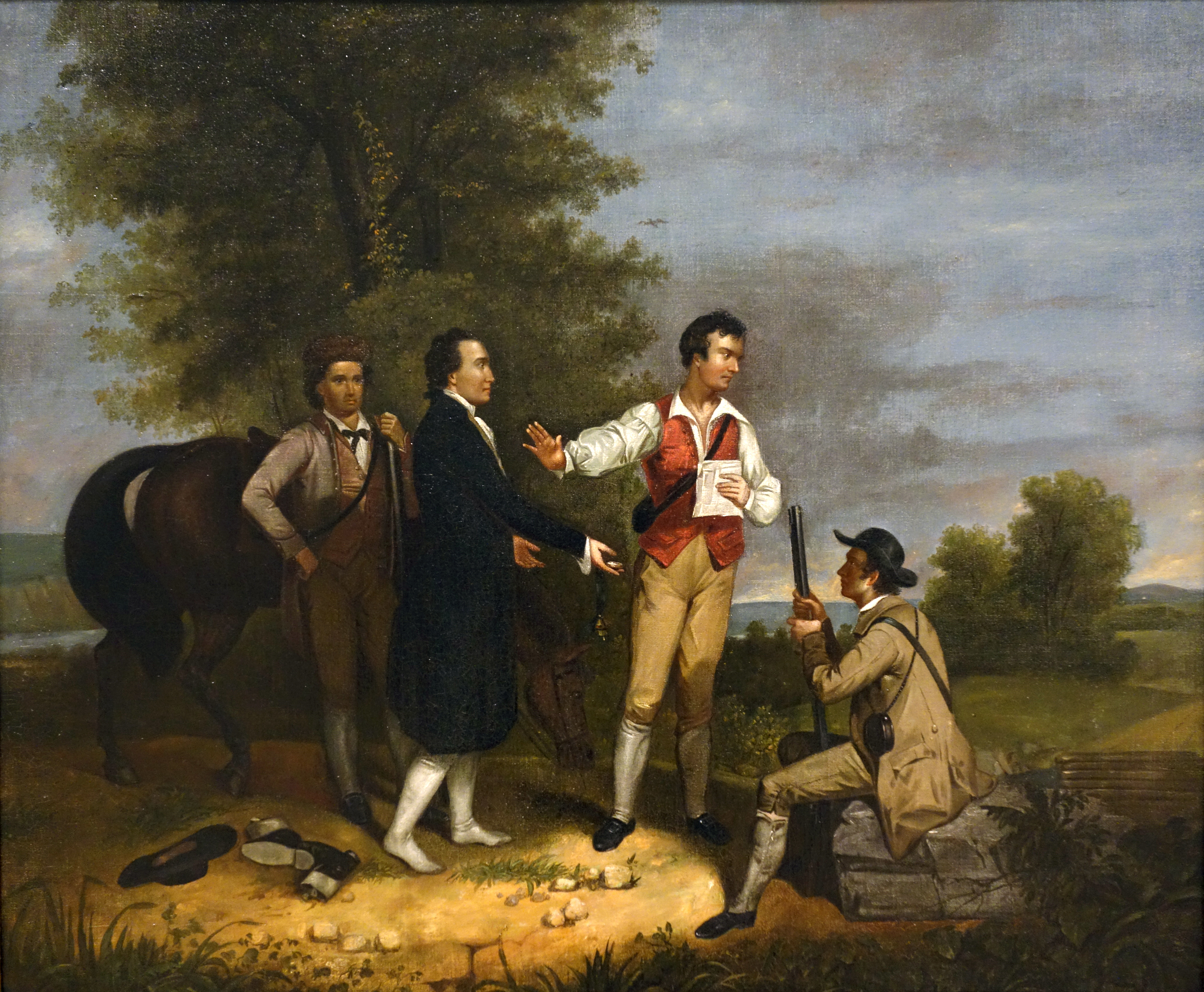
The Capture of Major Andre by Asher Durand (1833)

Unlike the "hotbeds of radicalism" in New England, the general population of Westchester before the war was characterized by a conservative, agrarian outlook. The upper classes were divided between Patriot and Loyalist sympathies, with Loyalists (or Tories, as they were called by Patriots) constituting "a substantial minority." The leading Loyalist in the Province of New York was Samuel Seabury, rector of an Anglican parish in lower Westchester County, who wrote fiery anti-rebellion pamphlets under the pen name A. W. Farmer (standing for "a Westchester farmer"). Members of Westchester's most prominent families, despite being closely related, were on opposite sides: the Philipses of Philipsburg Manor were unyielding Loyalists, while the Van Cortlandts of Van Cortlandt Manor were prominent leaders for the Patriot cause.

At Philipse Manor Hall (in what is now Yonkers), British General Henry Clinton in the summer of 1779 wrote the Philipsburg Proclamation, which declared all Patriot-owned slaves to be free and that blacks taken prisoner while serving in Patriot forces would be sold into slavery. Westchester's Black Loyalists, along with numerous white Loyalist refugees, fled the Neutral Ground for British-occupied Manhattan and Long Island. There, Westchester refugees formed Loyalist military units. Local historian Henry Steiner writes: "The character of the fighting in Westchester County was as much that of a civil war as it was a war for independence."

Major Loyalist military units operating in the Neutral Ground included Queen's Rangers (or Rogers' Rangers), Emmerick's Chasseurs (commanded by German soldier Andreas Emmerich who would later write a manual on guerrilla warfare, The Partisan in War), Skinner's Greens or Skinners (the term "skinners" was also applied to all maraudering bands, including Patriot-aligned guerrilla groups), De Lancey's Brigade (commanded by Oliver De Lancey), and De Lancey's Cowboys (often called simply "the Refugees" by the locals; this much-hated unit was commanded by James De Lancey, Oliver's nephew). They were engaged in military raids as well as in looting and cattle raiding, for which De Lancey's Cowboys were particularly notorious.

The majority of local residents–from tenant farmers to storekeepers to freeholders–remained apolitical and nonpartisan until the conflict physically arrived at their doorsteps. "The mixed political outlook of the population, with some initial opposition to the Revolution and a strong sentiment of neutrality, meant that the Patriot government could not automatically count on community support in efforts to stabilize the region." Eventually, however, a significant part of the populace joined the fight against the British. "Until the march of the British through the County and the Battle of White Plains, the lines between the political parties were not sharply drawn and only after personal suffering from continued raids did that bitterness develop that remained till after the close of the war and eventually made the farmer boys of Westchester a match for the best British light troops and the raiding bands of the native Refugee cowboys..."

The newly converted Patriots (or Rebels, as they were called by the Loyalists) joined Westchester militia regiments. These units were part of the state militia whose main function was guarding the area, but they would later frequently serve with the Continental Army in military operations. In January 1777, General William Heath asked the Westchester Committee of Safety for local men to help the army navigate the famously difficult Westchester terrain. This led to the formation of the Westchester Guides, an elite group who served as pathfinders, scouts, and advisors for high-ranking officers and became essential fixtures in virtually every Continental Army operation within the county. Some of the Westchester guides, such as Abraham "Brom" Dyckman and Cornelius Oakley, commanded their own units of irregular cavalry, conducting raids against Loyalist regiments and irregulars, provisioning American troops, and gathering military intelligence for the Continentals.

The Whaleboat War (1776–1783) heavily featured activities in Westchester County's "neutral" waters, particularly in the Long Island Sound and the Hudson River at the Tappan Zee, where both Loyalist and Patriot boat crews engaged in smuggling, warehouse raiding, and small-boat warfare. Communities around New Rochelle, Harrison, and Rye frequently faced maritime raids, with homes broken into and goods stolen by crews coming from Long Island or Connecticut.

Both sides had numerous undercover agents operating in the Neutral Ground, such as the British spy Ann Bates, the American spy Enoch Crosby, and double agents Elijah Hunter and Luther Kennicutt. The famous capture of British intelligence officer John André in 1780 also took place in the Neutral Ground, in the Tarrytown area. James Fenimore Cooper's novel The Spy is set in the Neutral Ground of Westchester County.

It was only in May 1783 that British forces withdrew from their positions in southern Westchester, effectively ending its status as a battlefield, "but even then, long after peace had been proclaimed, a large body of American troops was necessary to protect the people from the irregular attacks of its own Refugee tory natives. Nor could this guard be withdrawn until the very day that Washington entered the City of New York, and the War of the Revolution was over." Even years later, wartime raiders would be occasionally recognized by their victims and killed on sight.

== Devastation and recovery ==
The Neutral Ground was ravaged by the war. In 1779, British troops burned Bedford, which was then the seat of Westchester County government, sparing only one house, which belonged to a Loyalist. British forces and Tory (Loyalist) raiders burned and destroyed numerous Patriot-owned farms and other localities, including the hamlet of Pound Ridge and parts of the towns of White Plains and Eastchester. Local properties were pillaged by the British and Hessian soldiers, Loyalist- and Patriot-affiliated foragers and partisans, discharged soldiers and deserters from the Continental Army, and sundry "outlaws and plunderers" affiliated with neither side. Farmers moved their livestock into the deep woods and buried their food supplies; some drove their cattle north of the Croton River to Patriot-controlled territory to sell them at public auction, or "vendue," rather than risk losing them for nothing. At the end of the war, Westchester was described as a "country in ruins," with deserted farms and ghost towns.

Was the Westchester County experience totally unique? Dr. Sung Bok Kim, a prominent historian of colonial and Revolutionary America, wrote:

The answer is both yes and no. It was unique in the sense that no other area of the United States except the New Jersey shoreline near New York City and Orange County on the west side of the Hudson River suffered depredations by the armed antagonists so often and so constantly. Military conflict was intense around Boston, Providence, towns along either side of Long Island Sound, Philadelphia, Norfolk, Savannah, Charlestown, and the backcountry of South and North Carolina, but it did not last long, and the intervals of respite gave the inhabitants a chance to restore order to their lives. Nevertheless, the American people in general, even when spared naked violence, labored under prolonged stress. Their government imposed enormous and constant demands on their money, service, loyalty, and patience to prosecute war.

Although the Revolutionary War devastated the county, the post-war recovery was rapid. Large estates belonging to Loyalists were confiscated by the state and sold by the Commissioners of Forfeiture to former tenant farmers, war veterans, and industrious newcomers. In total, fifty-four Westchester Loyalist estates were confiscated and sold, with the massive Philipsburg Manor being the largest. The nearby–and now booming–New York City offered a ready market for Westchester's agricultural products and fast-growing industries. In 1798, the first federal census recorded a population of 24,000 for the county, a 140% increase from what it was at the end of the war.

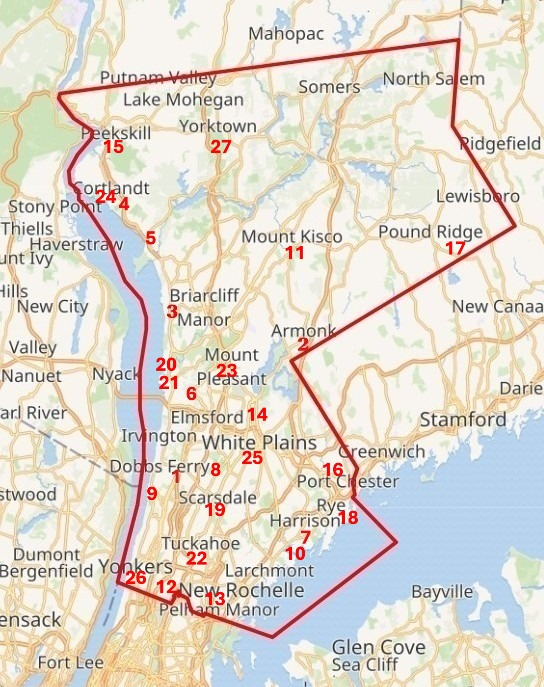
Revolutionary War sites and markers in Westchester County (map modified from © OpenStreetMap)

== Neutral Ground sites, monuments, and markers ==
Since the turn of the 20th century, numerous Revolutionary War historical markers have been installed throughout Westchester by various agencies, foundations, and heritage organizations, including the New York State Education Department, William G. Pomeroy Foundation, Westchester County Historical Society, Daughters of the American Revolution, Revolutionary Westchester 250, and local municipalities and historical societies. Present-day Westchester County contains more than 50 Revolutionary War sites, including historic structures, monuments, and burial grounds; almost all of them have commemorative plaques and/or interpretive panels. (For Neutral Ground-related sites and markers in present-day North Bronx, see articles: Kingsbridge, Pelham Bay Park, Valentine-Varian House, Van Cortlandt House, Van Cortlandt Park, and Woodlawn Cemetery.)

Key Westchester sites and markers are listed below in alphabetical order by location.

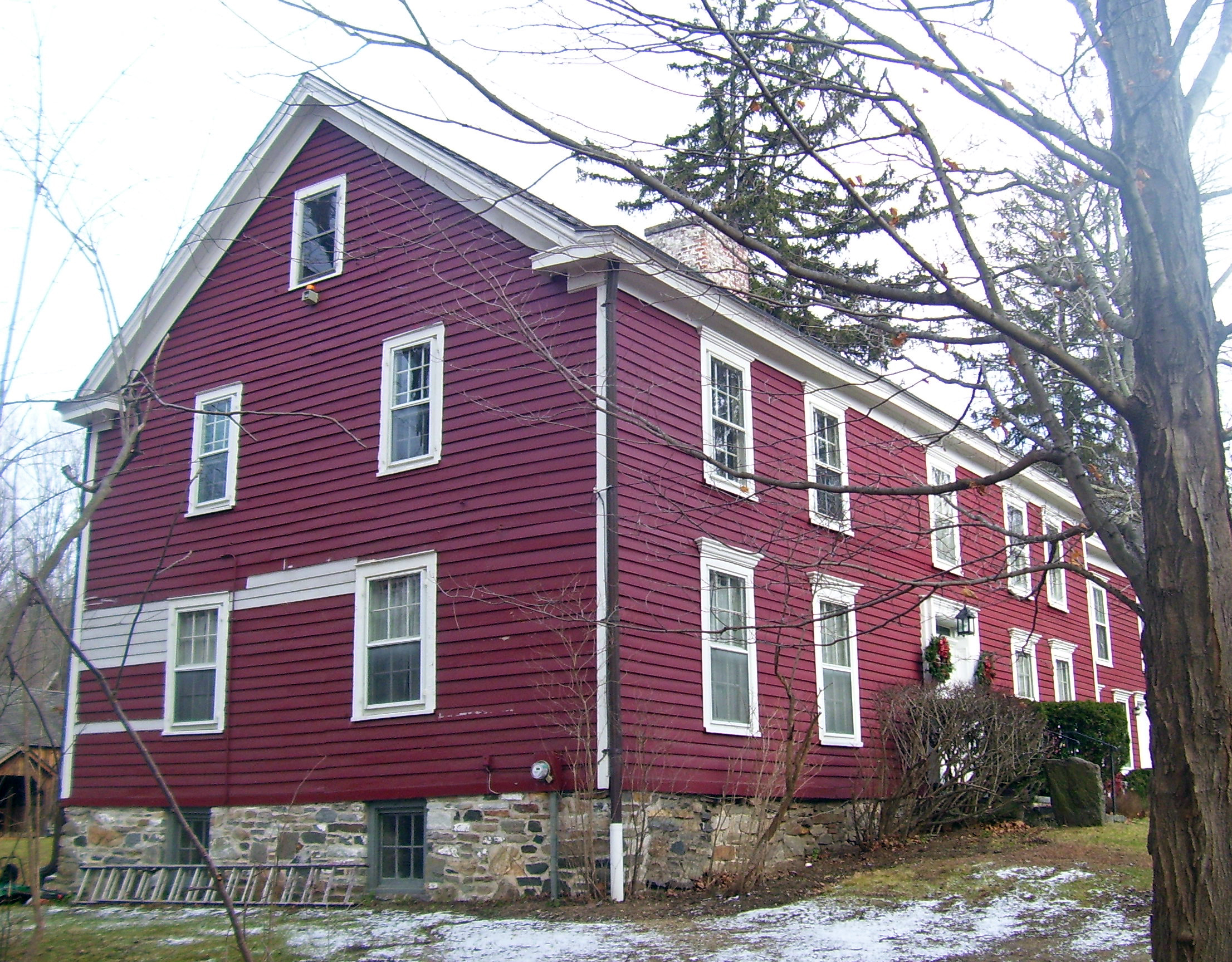
Armonk: Smith Tavern

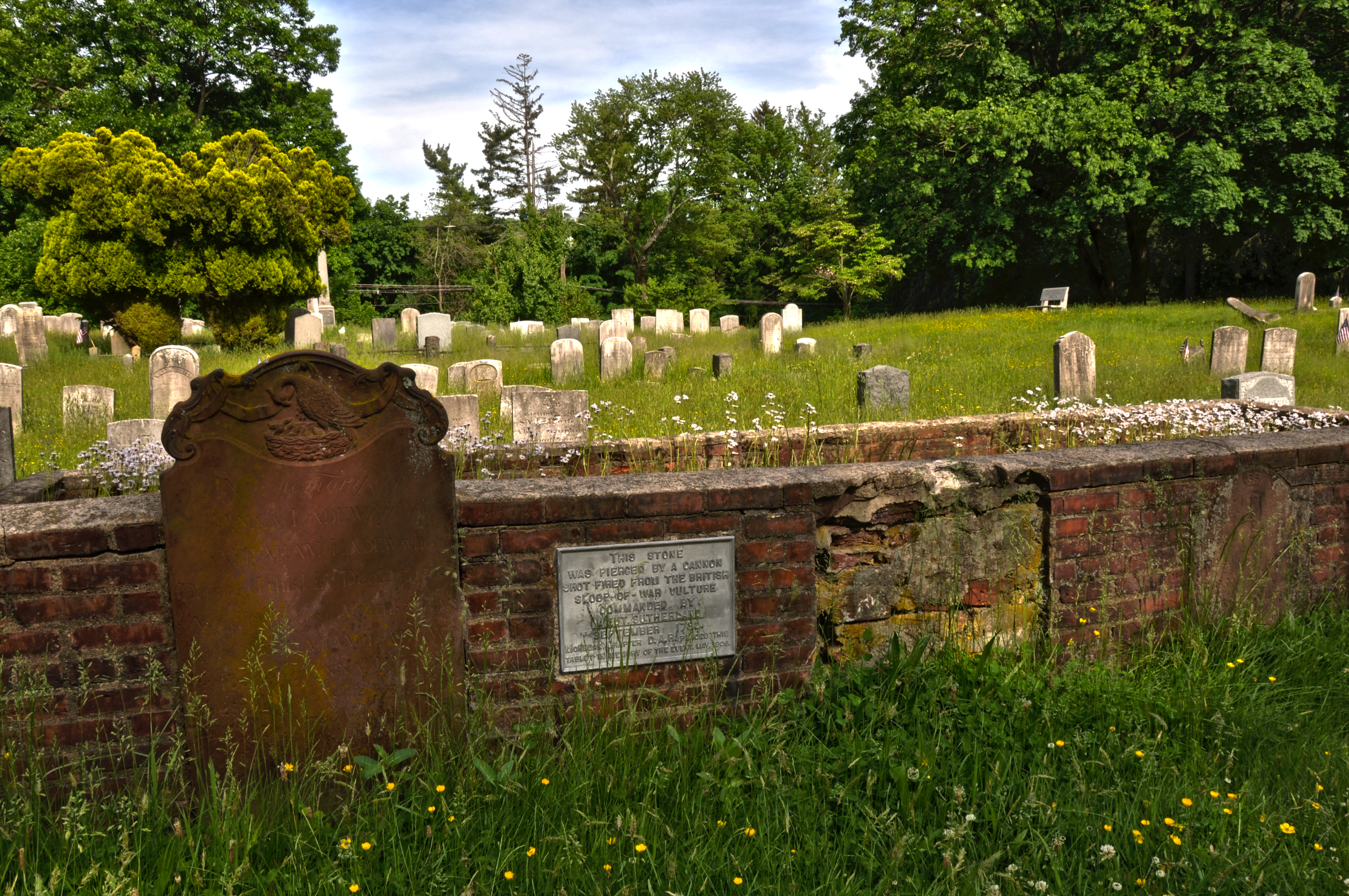
Briarcliff Manor: Ladew plot in Sparta Cemetery

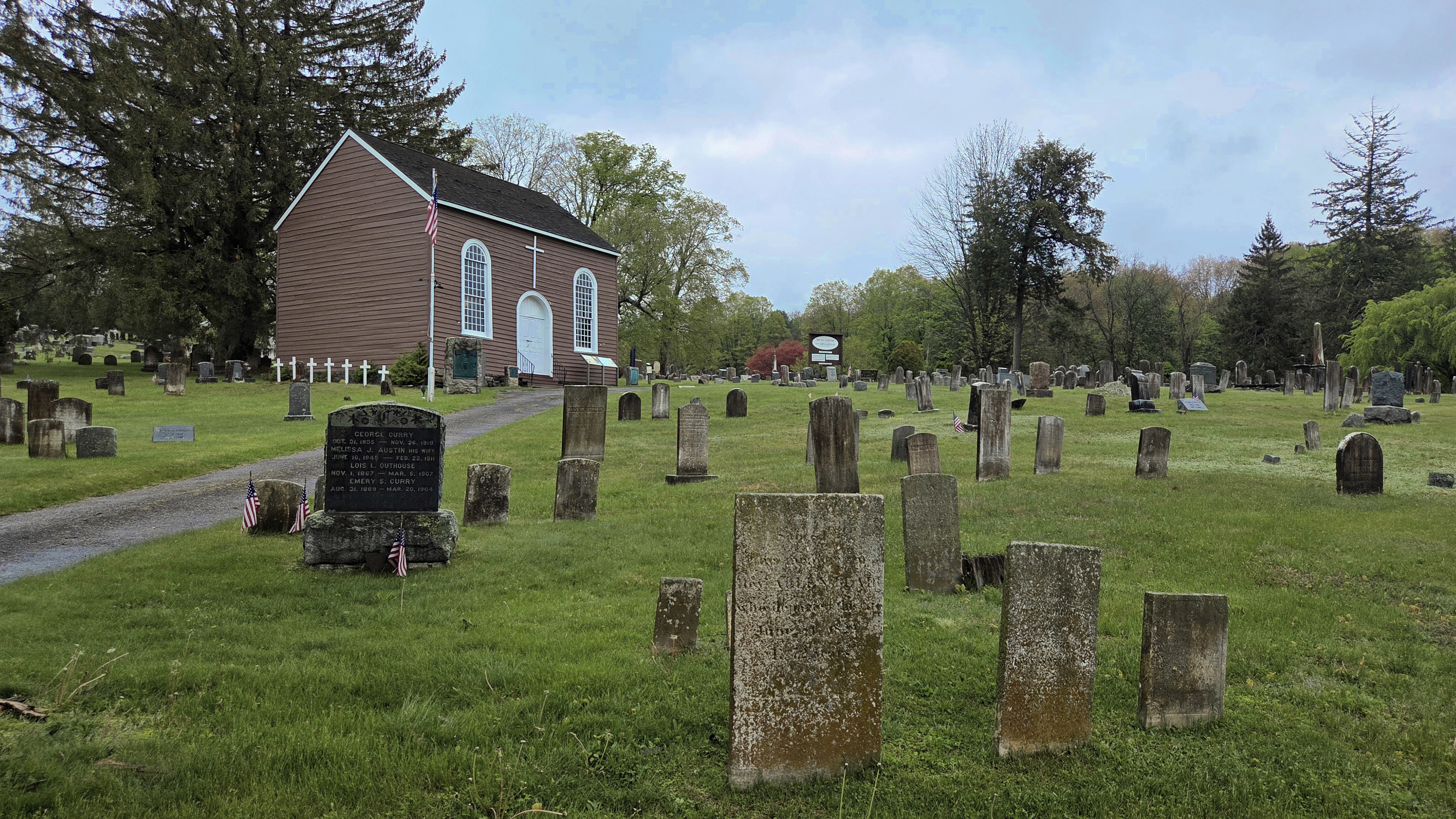
Cortlandt: Old St. Peter's Church and Old Van Cortlandtville Cemetery

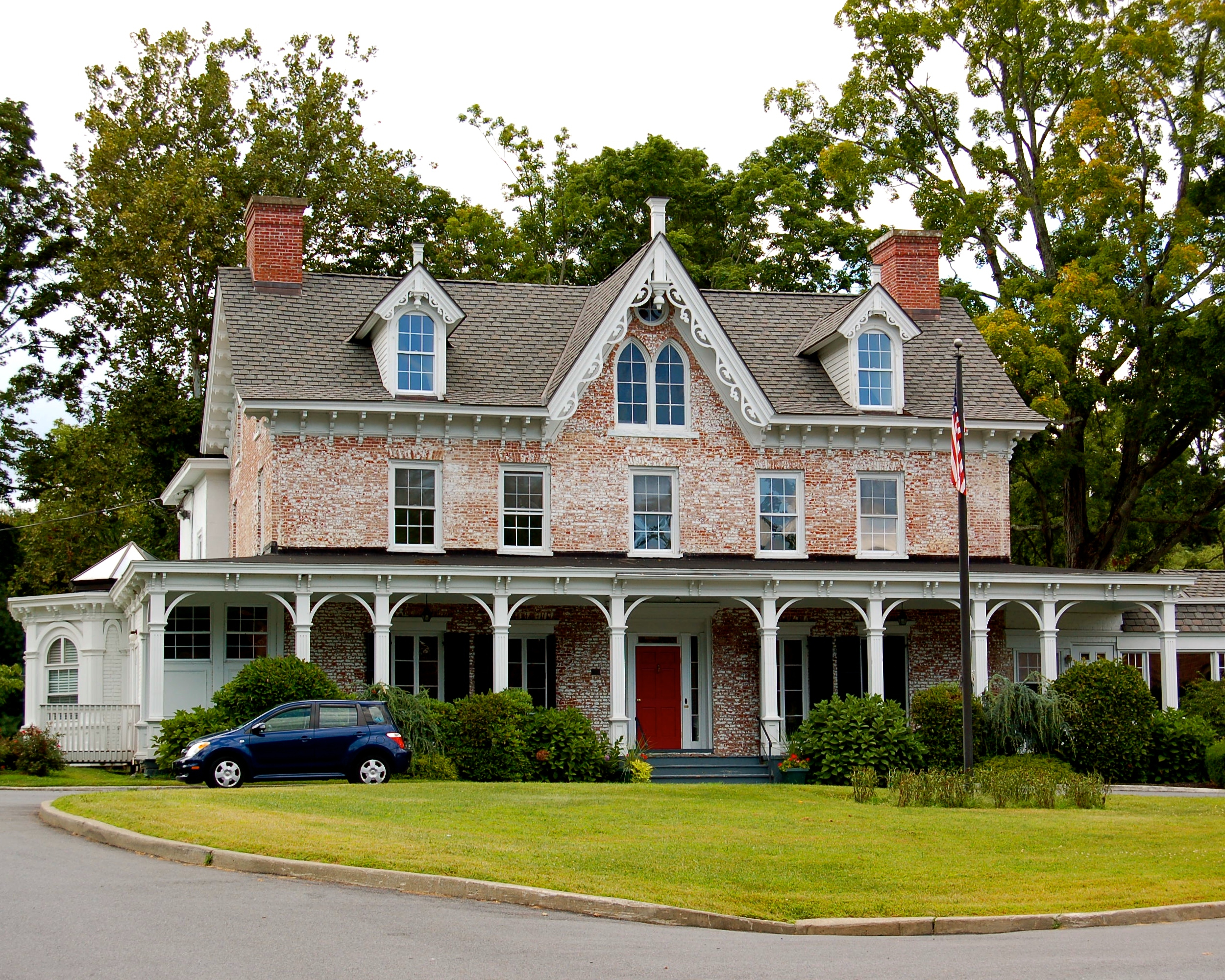
Cortlandt: Van Cortlandt Upper Manor House

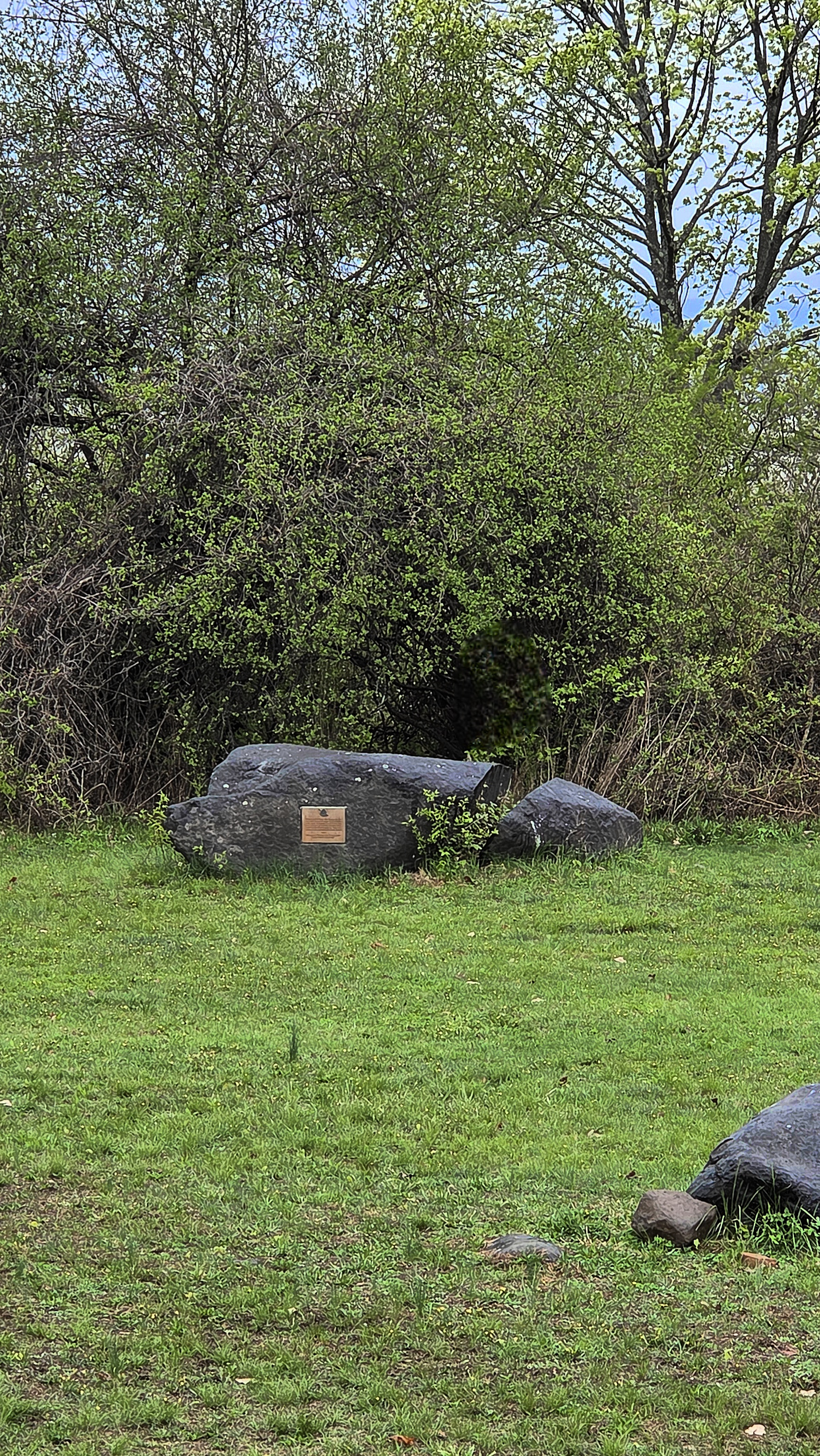
Croton-on-Hudson: Jack Peterson Memorial

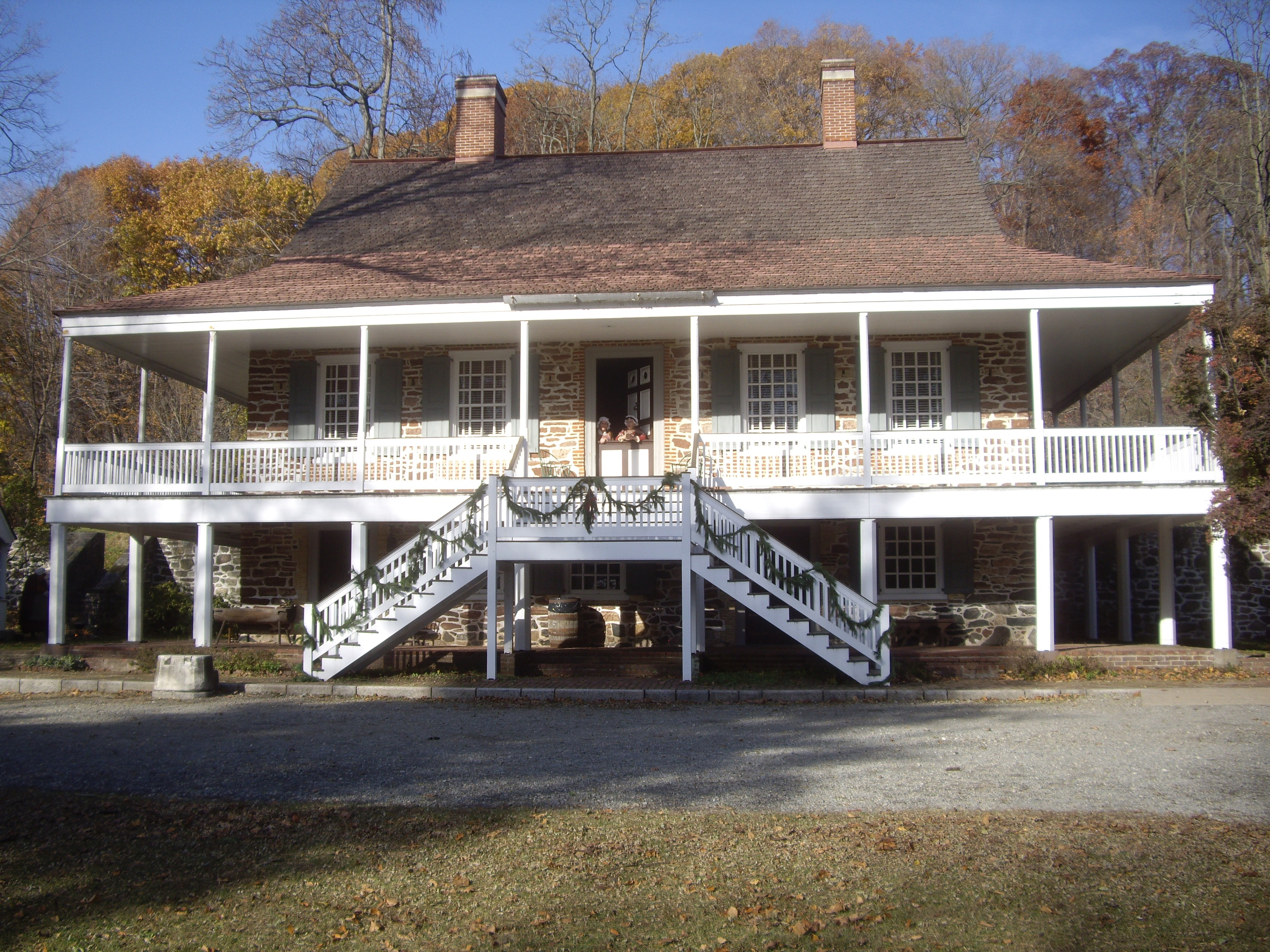
Croton-on-Hudson: Van Cortlandt Manor

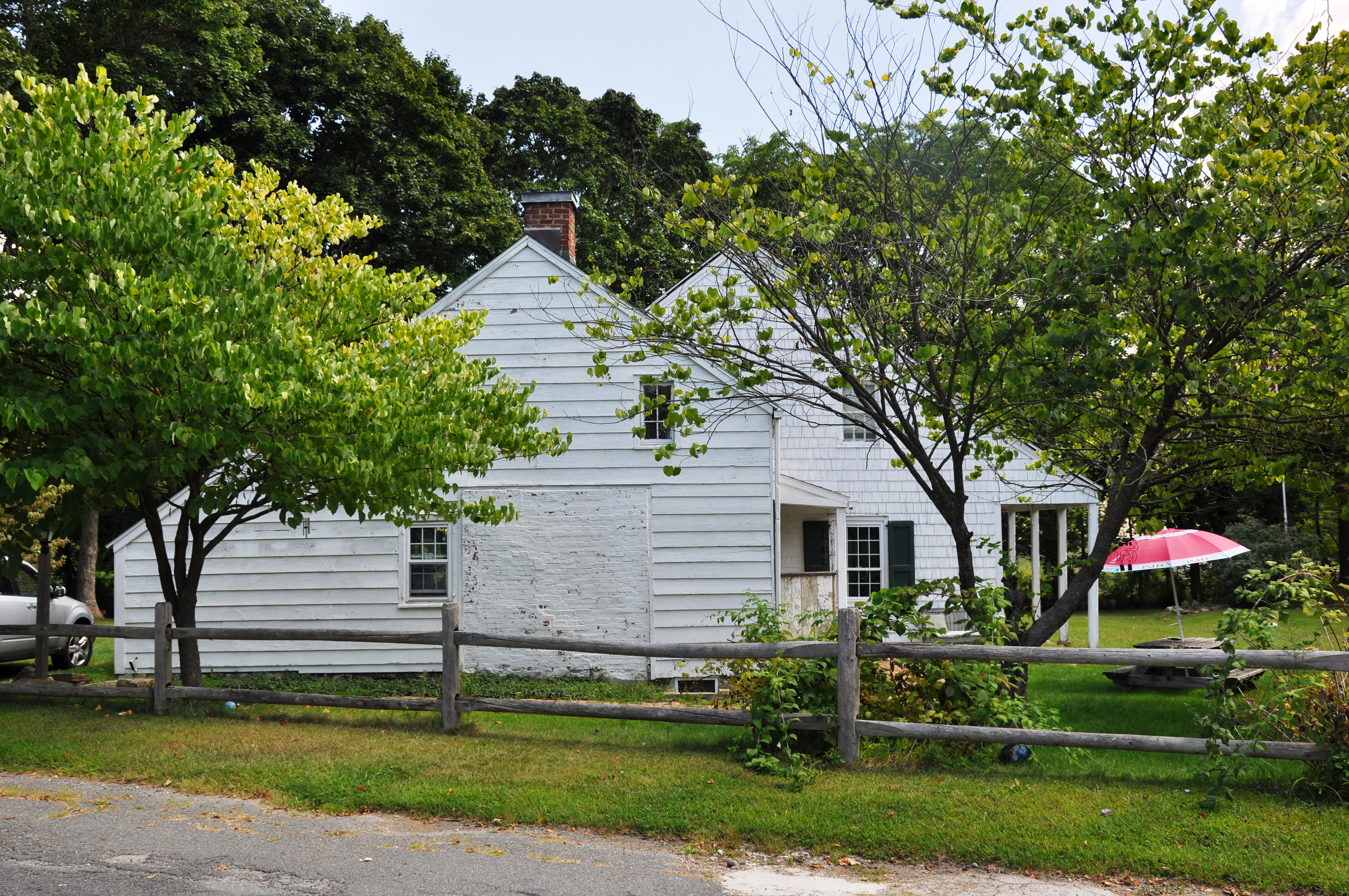
Eastview: Hammond House

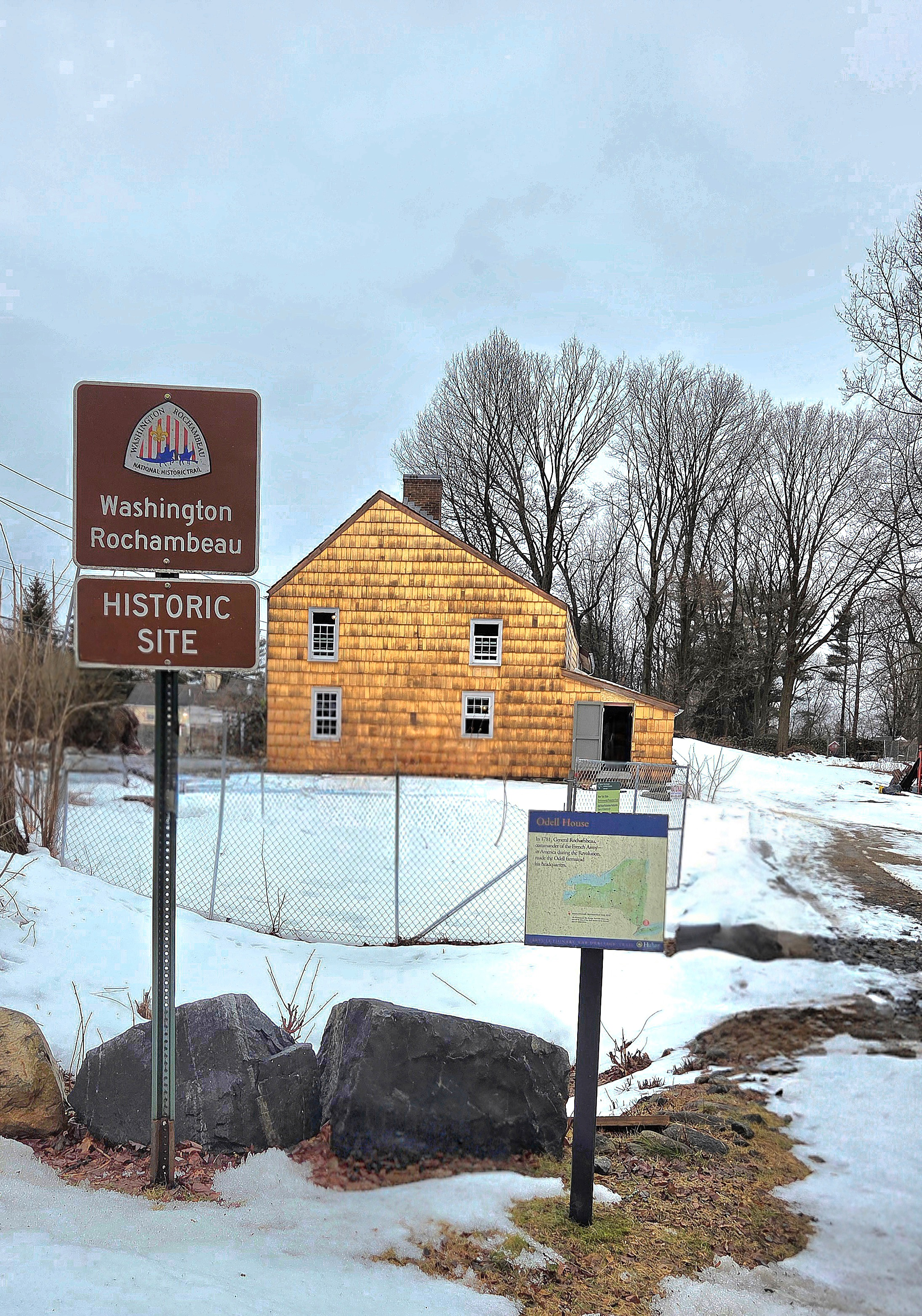
Hartsdale: Odell House

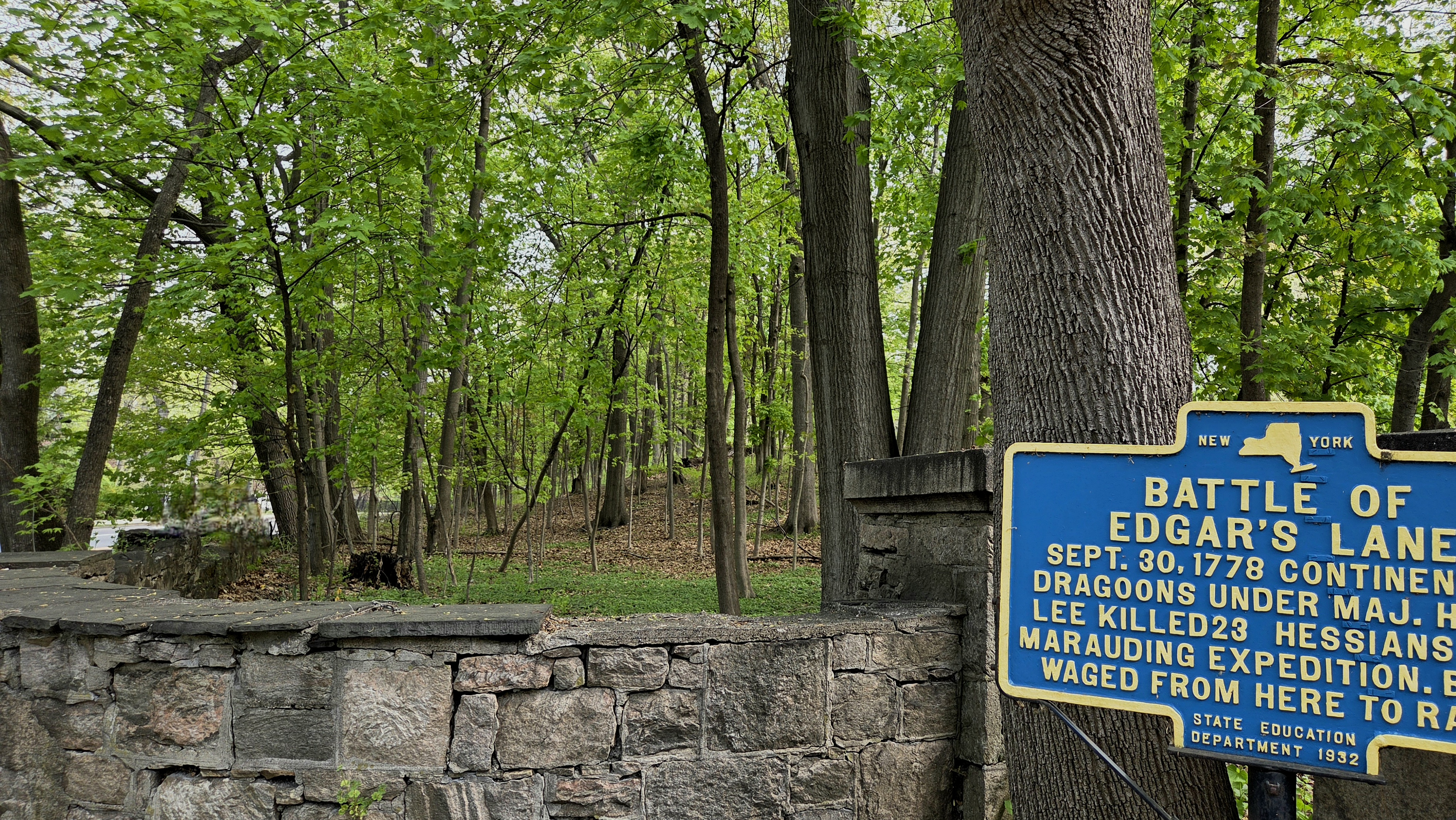
Hastings-on-Hudson: Battle of Edgar's Lane site

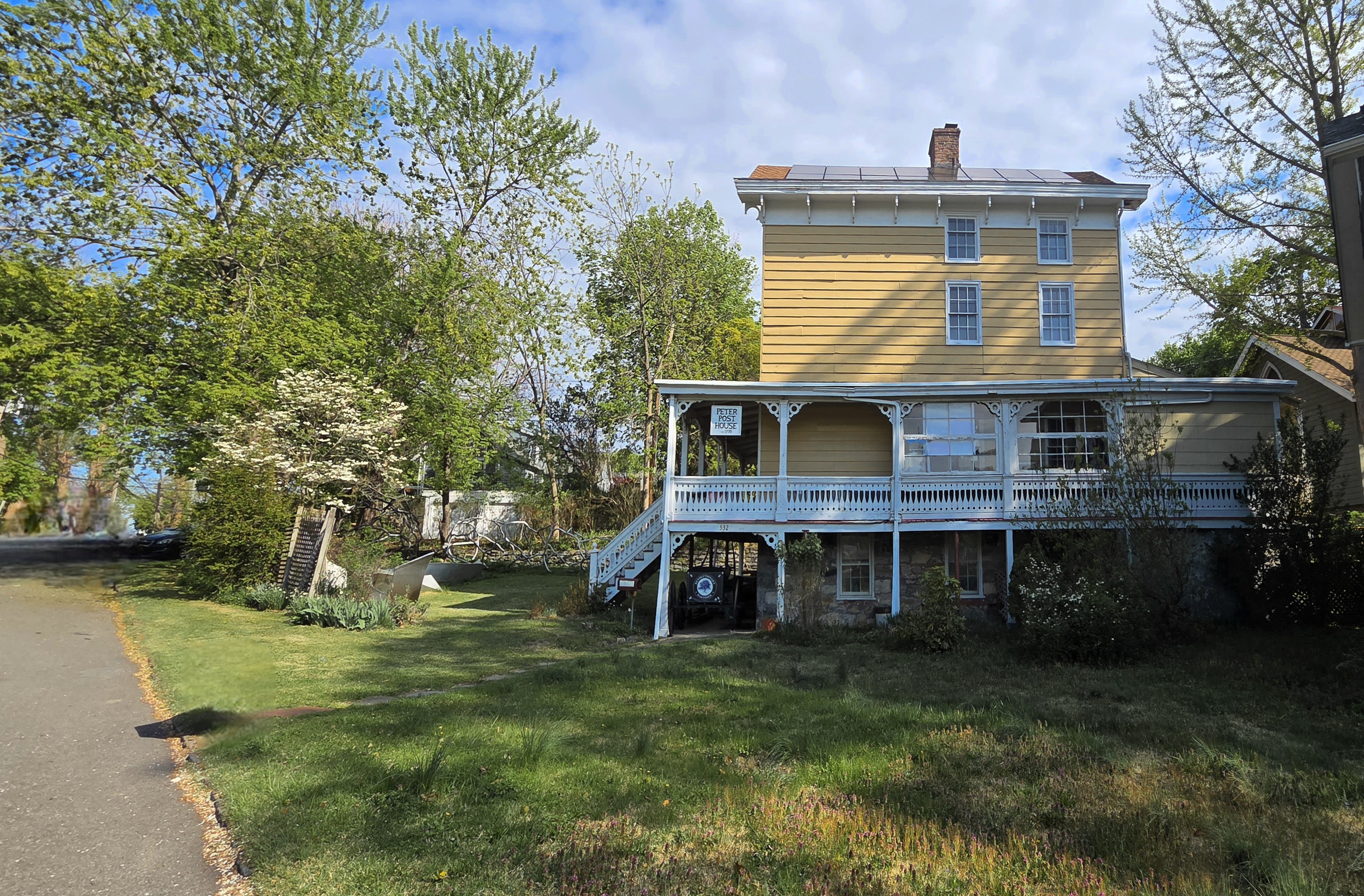
Hastings-on-Hudson: Post-Baker House

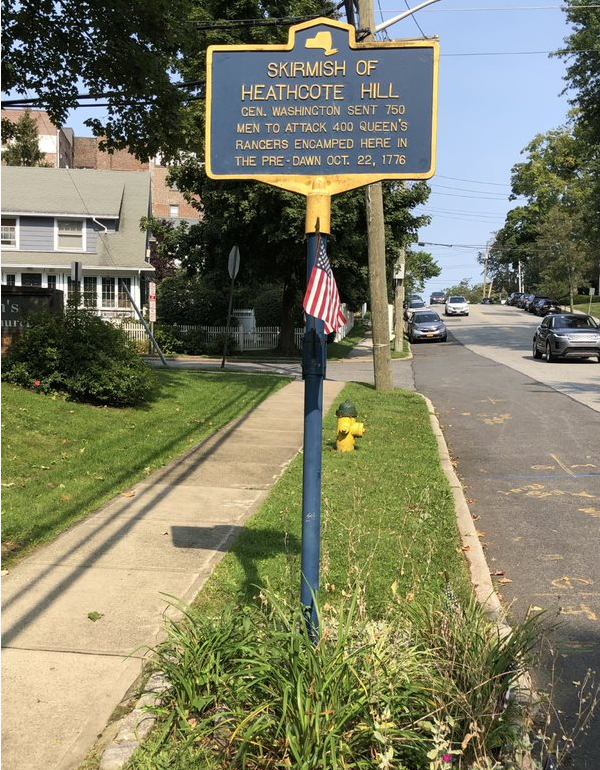
Mamaroneck: Skirmish of Heathcote Hill marker

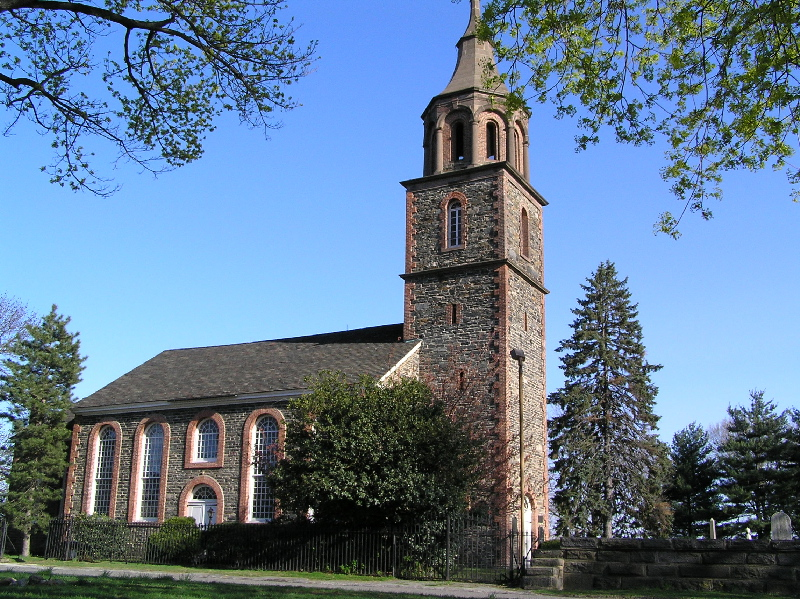
Mount Vernon: Saint Paul's Church

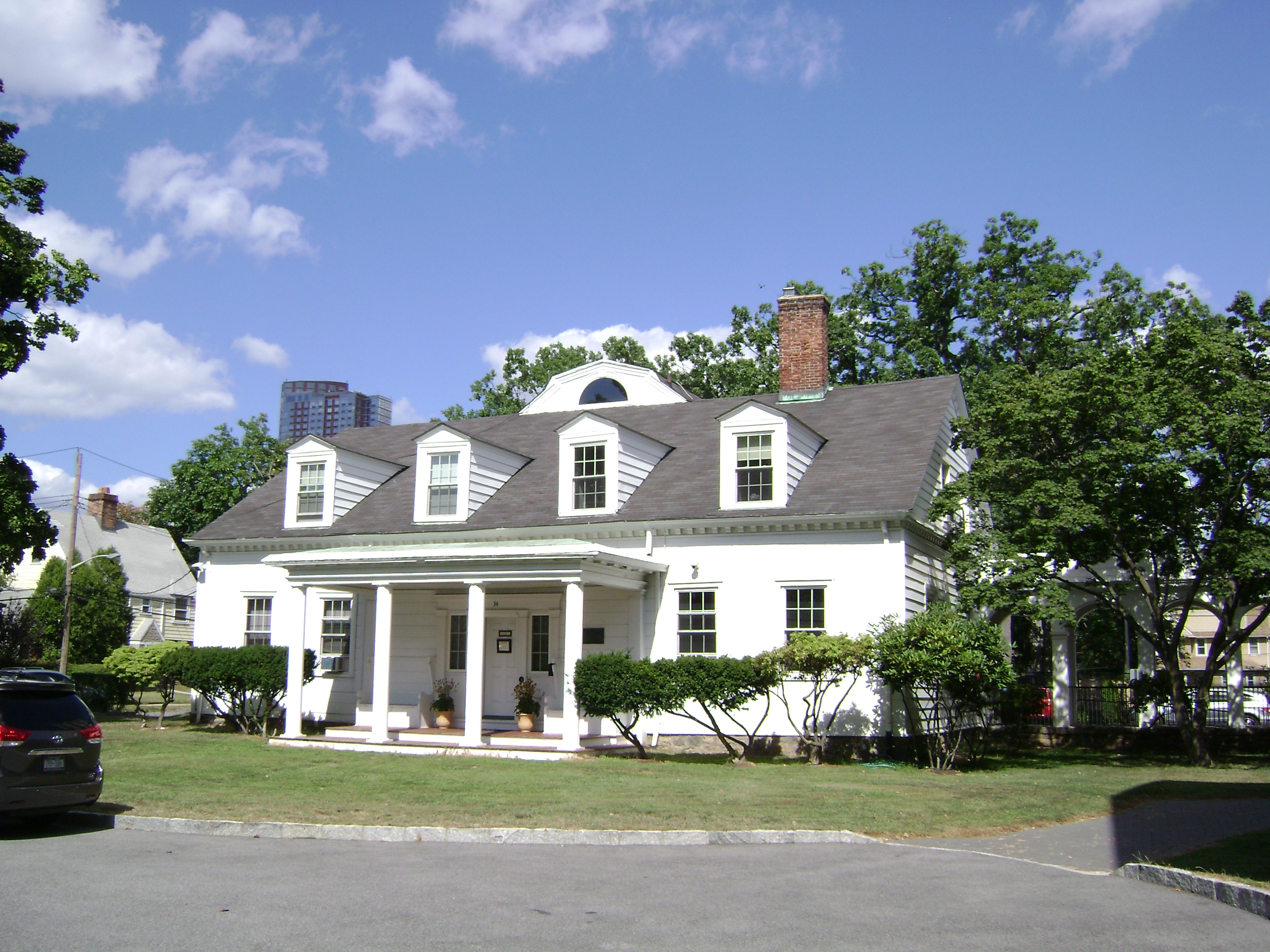
New Rochelle: Lewis Pintard House

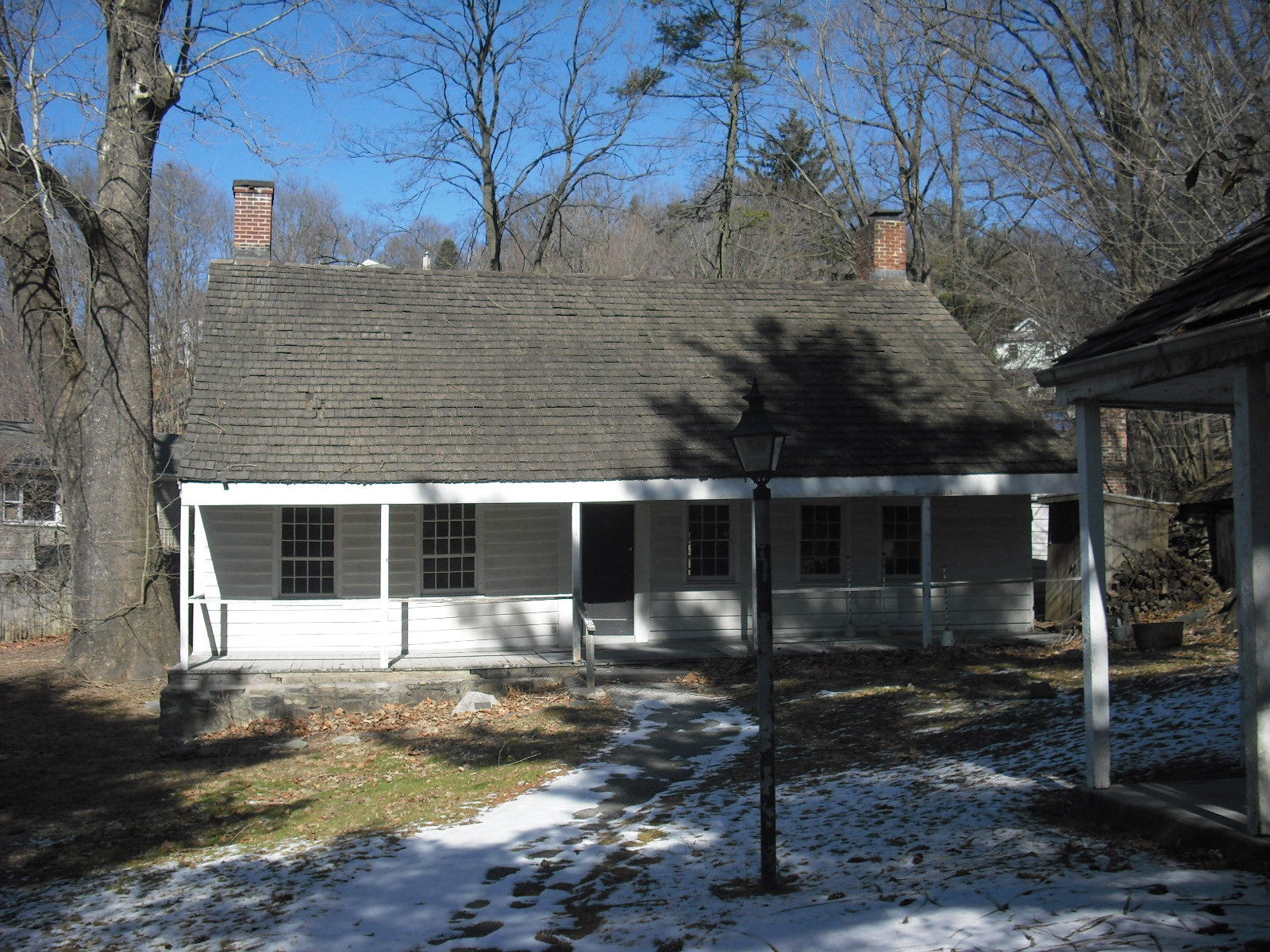
North White Plains: Elijah Miller House

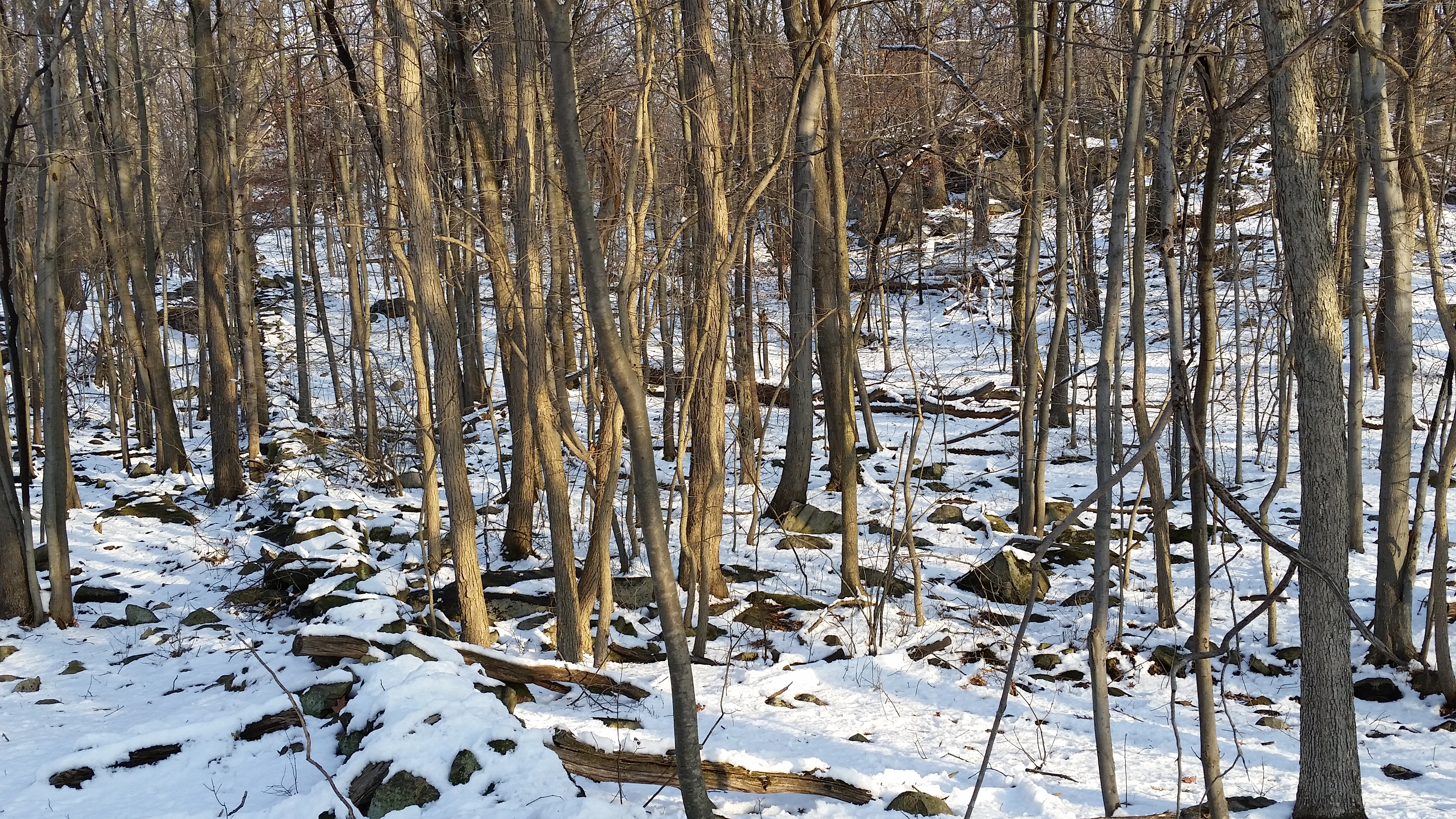
Peekskill: Remnants of a Camp Peekskill redoubt

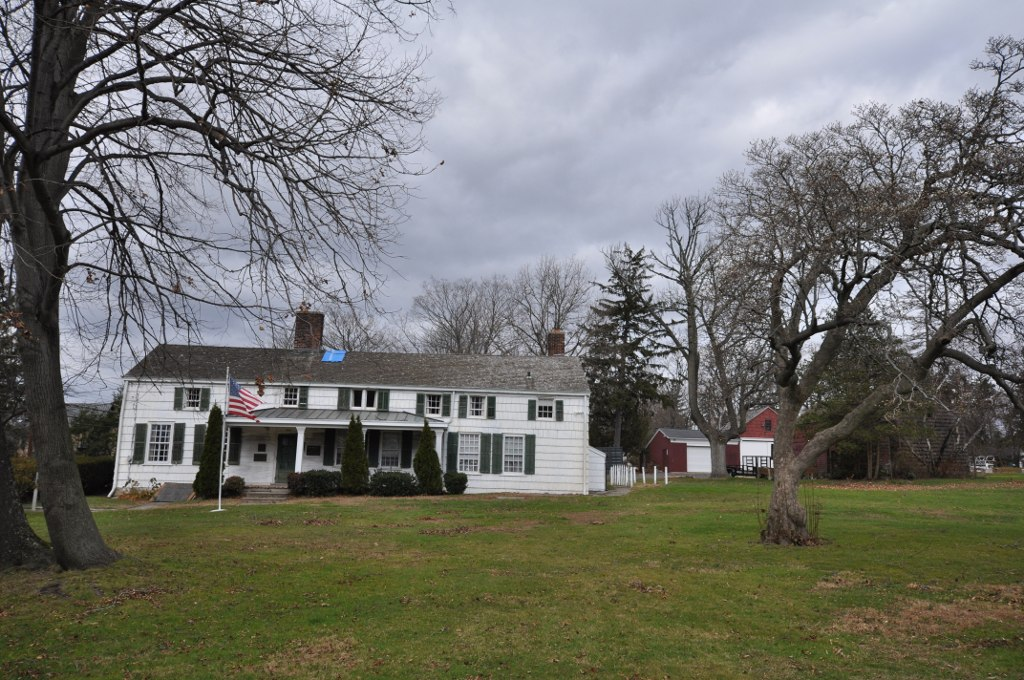
Port Chester: Bush-Lyon Homestead

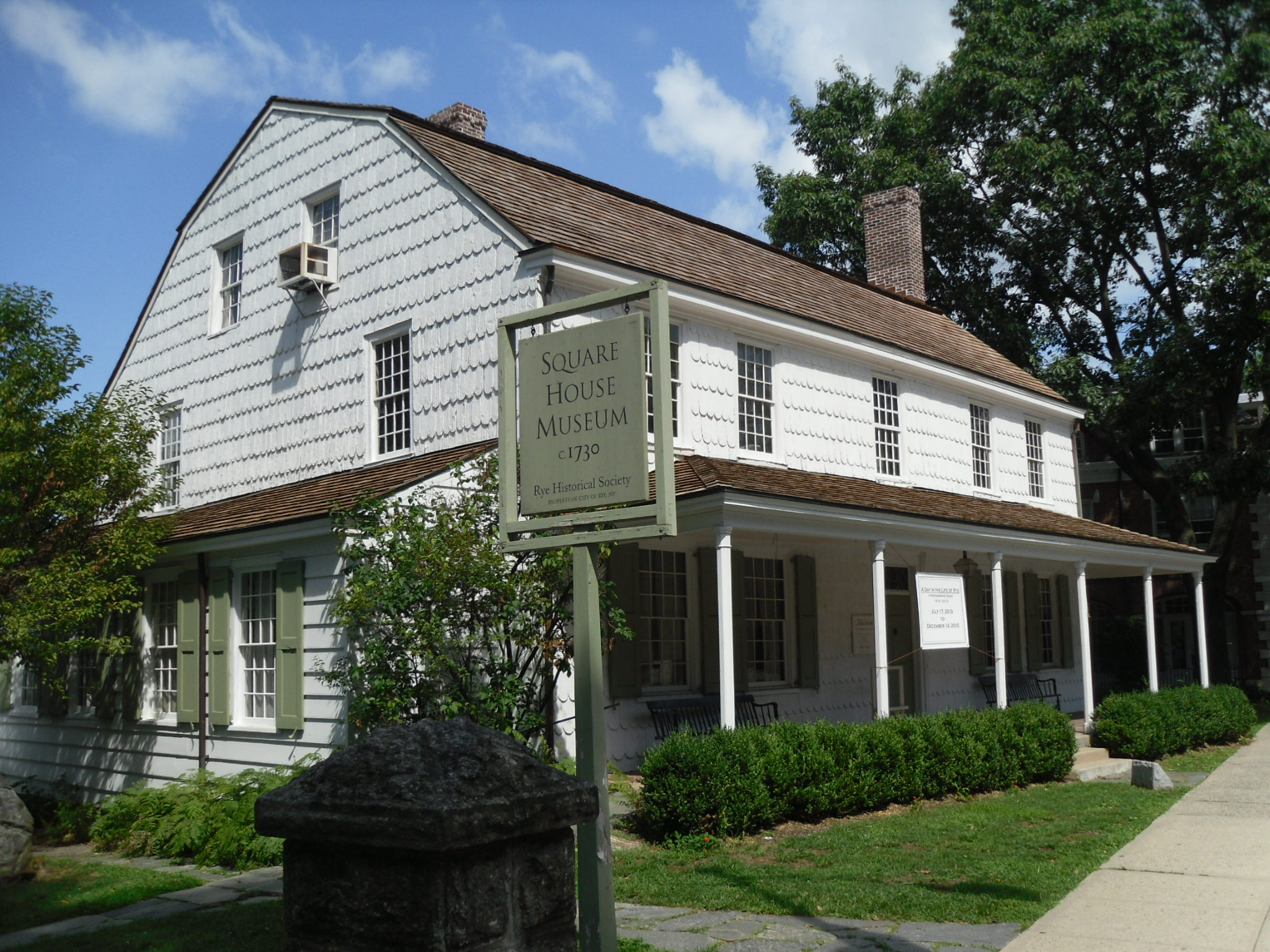
Rye: Widow Haviland's Tavern

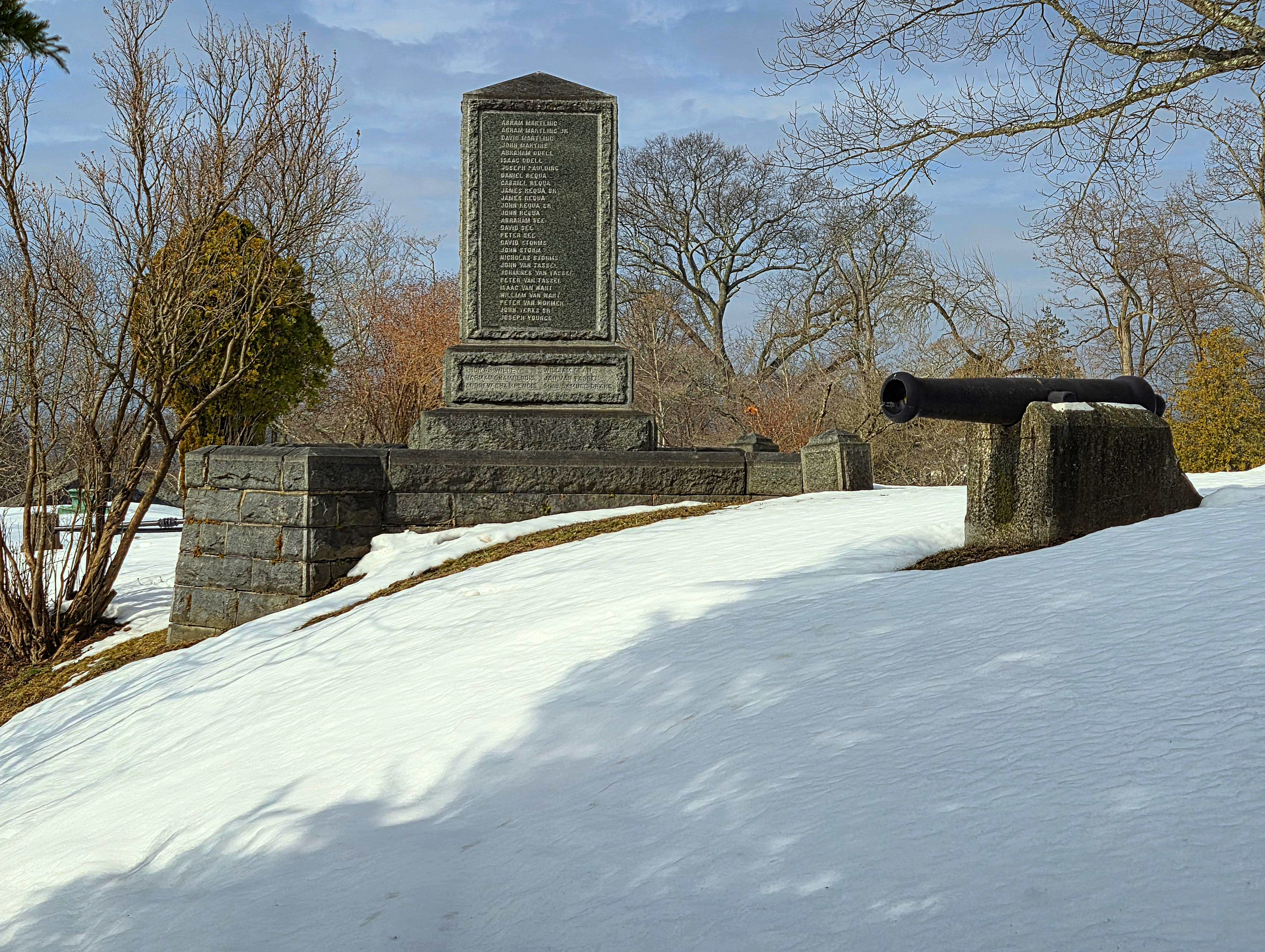
Sleepy Hollow: Revolutionary Soldiers' Monument

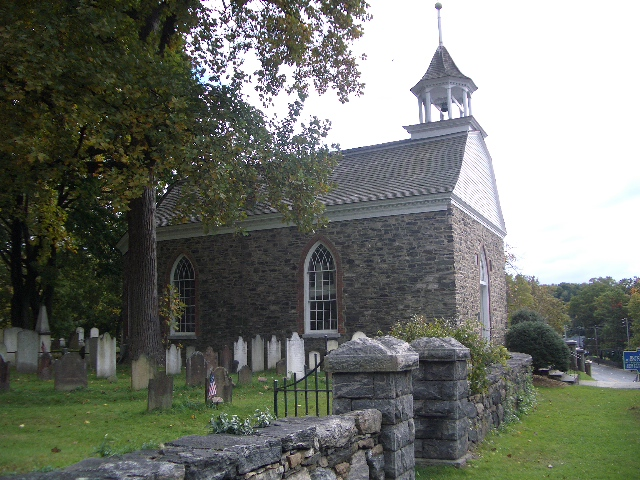
Sleepy Hollow: Old Dutch Church and Burying Ground

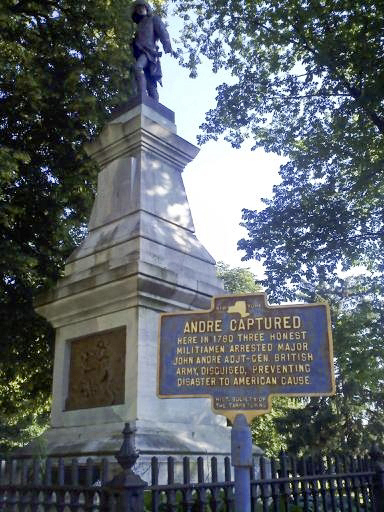
Tarrytown: Captors' Monument

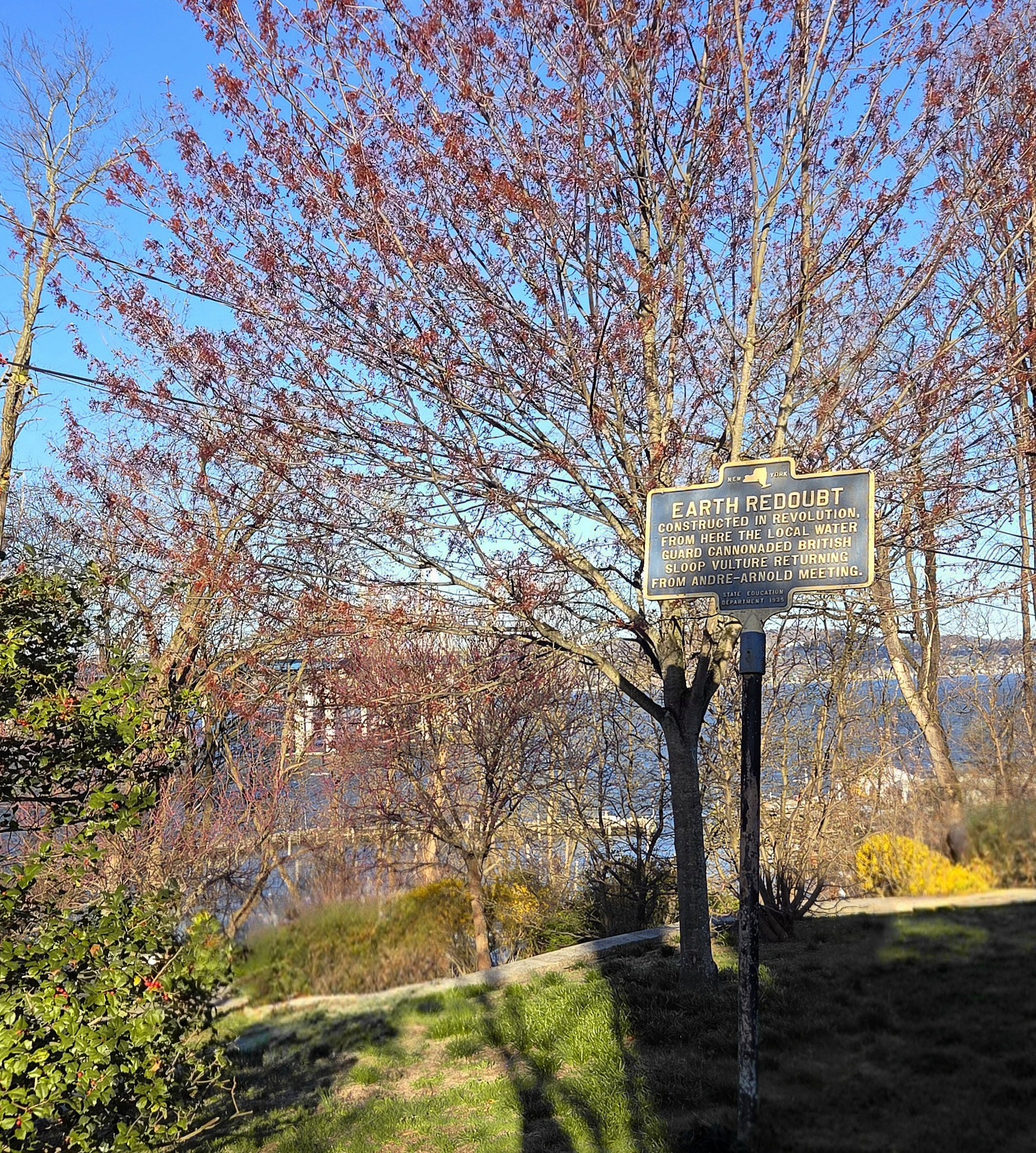
Tarrytown: Earth Redoubt marker

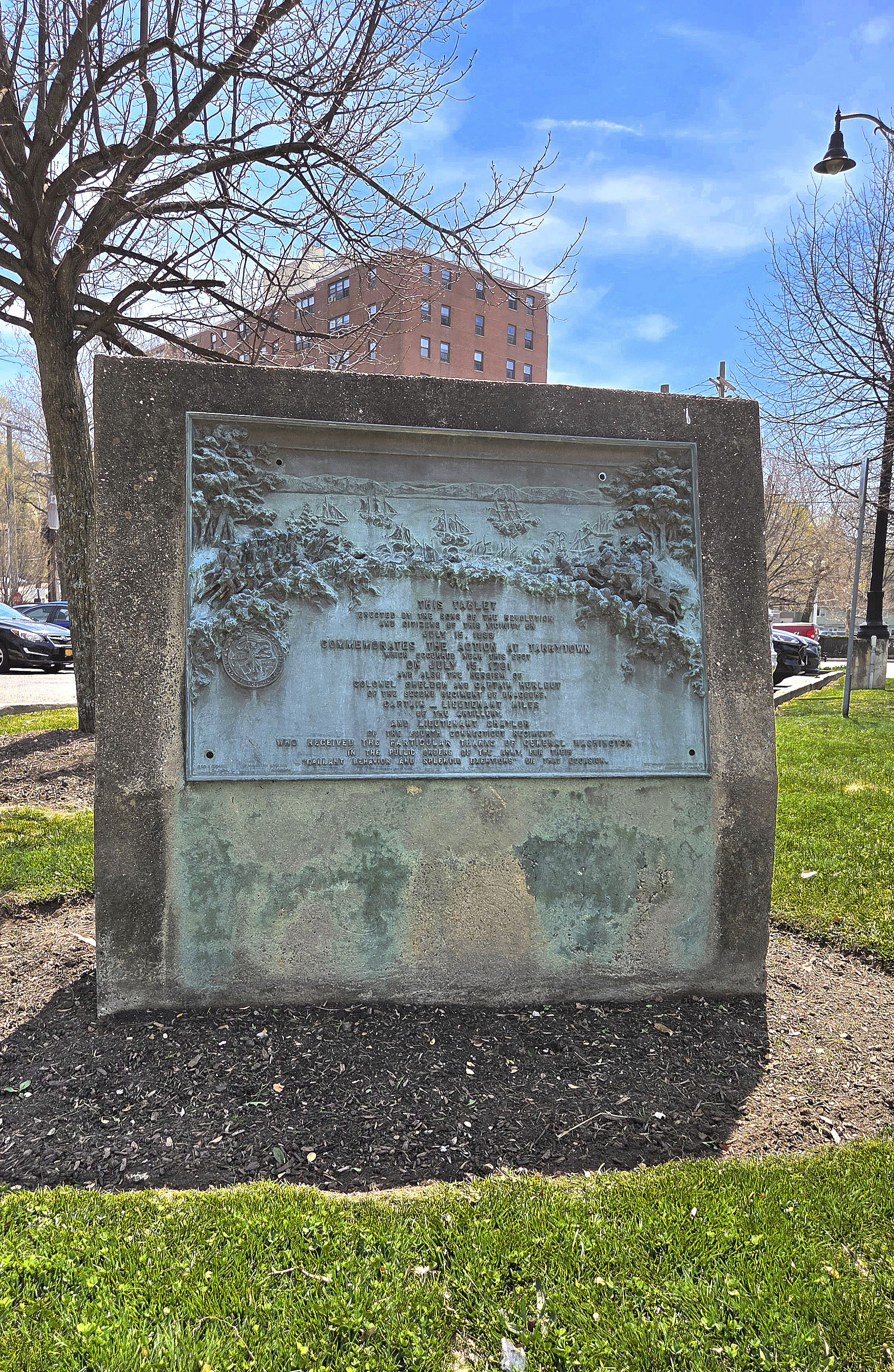
Tarrytown: The Action at Tarrytown memorial tablet

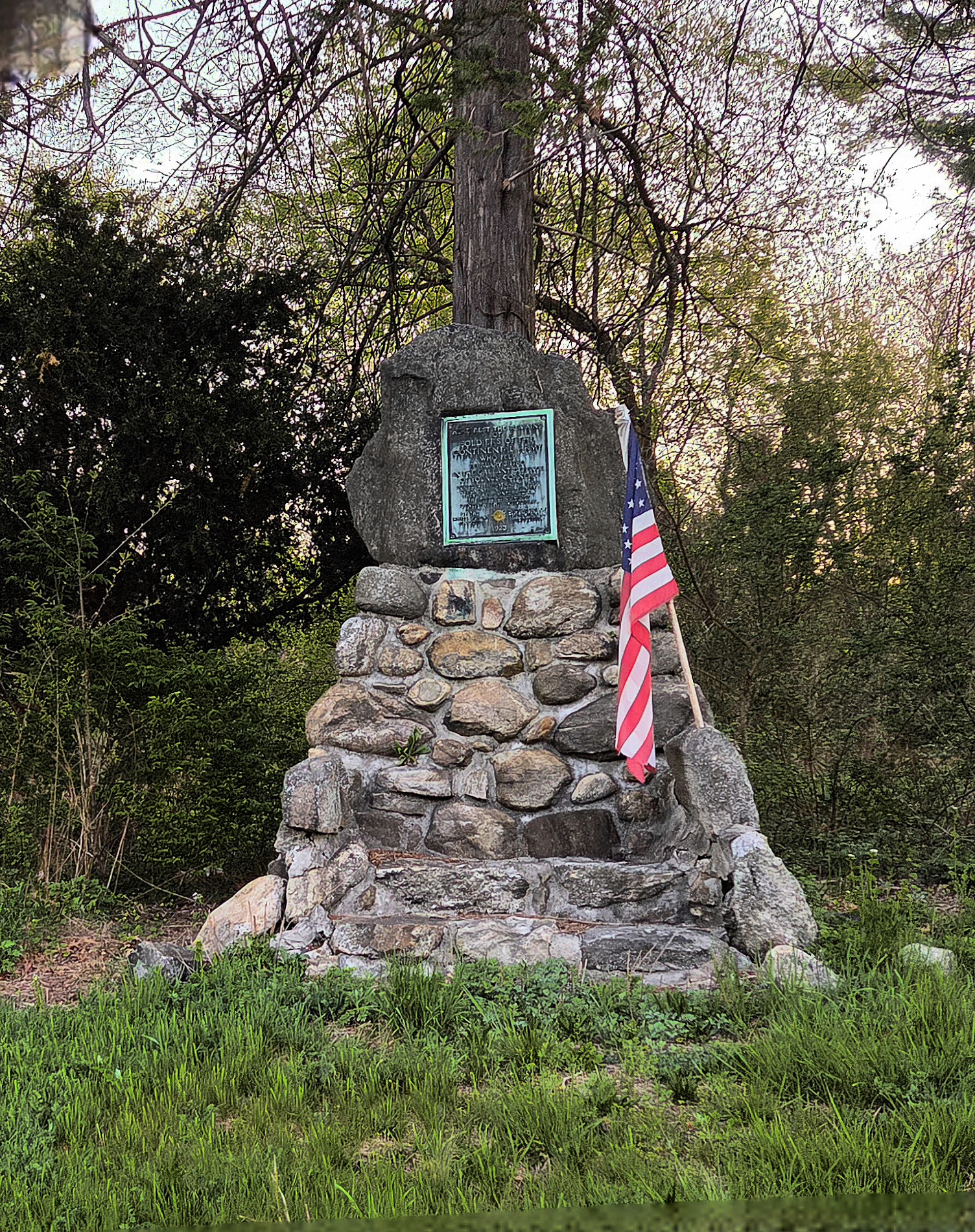
Valhalla: Battle of Young's House site

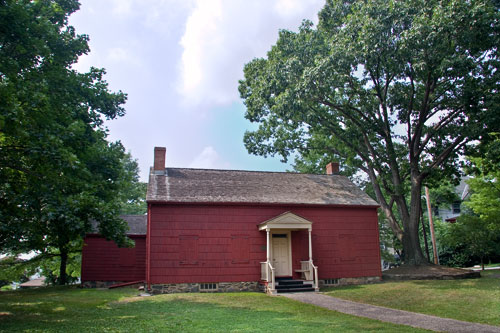
White Plains: Jacob Purdy House

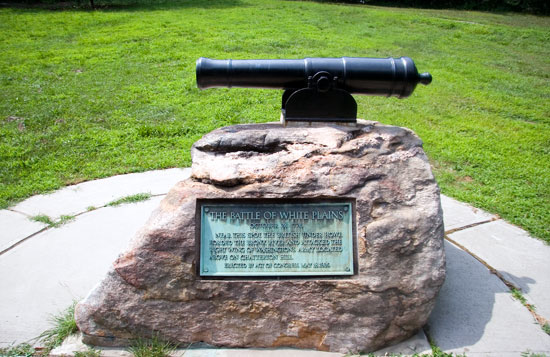
White Plains: Cannon in Battle of White Plains Park

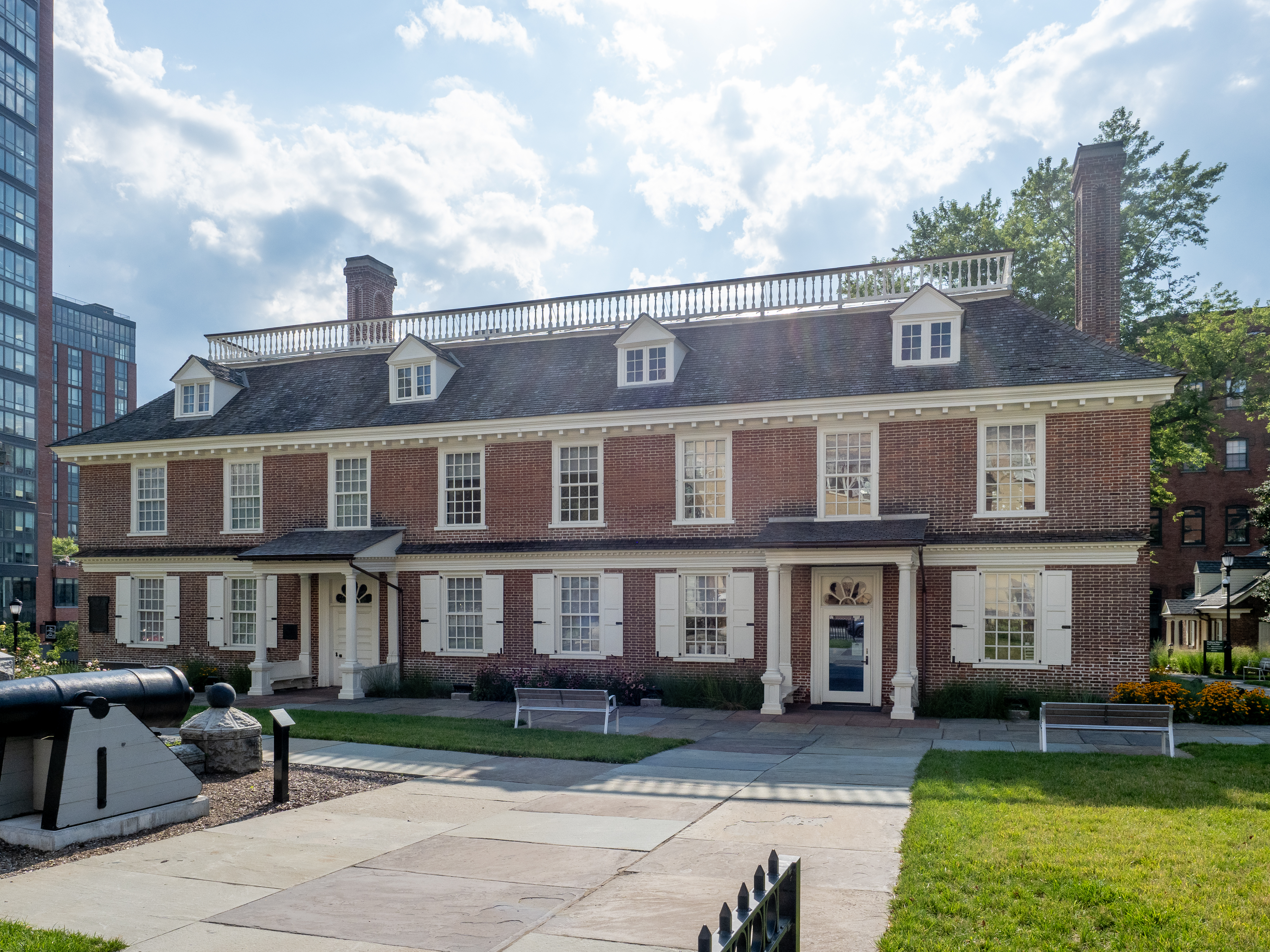
Yonkers: Philipse Manor Hall

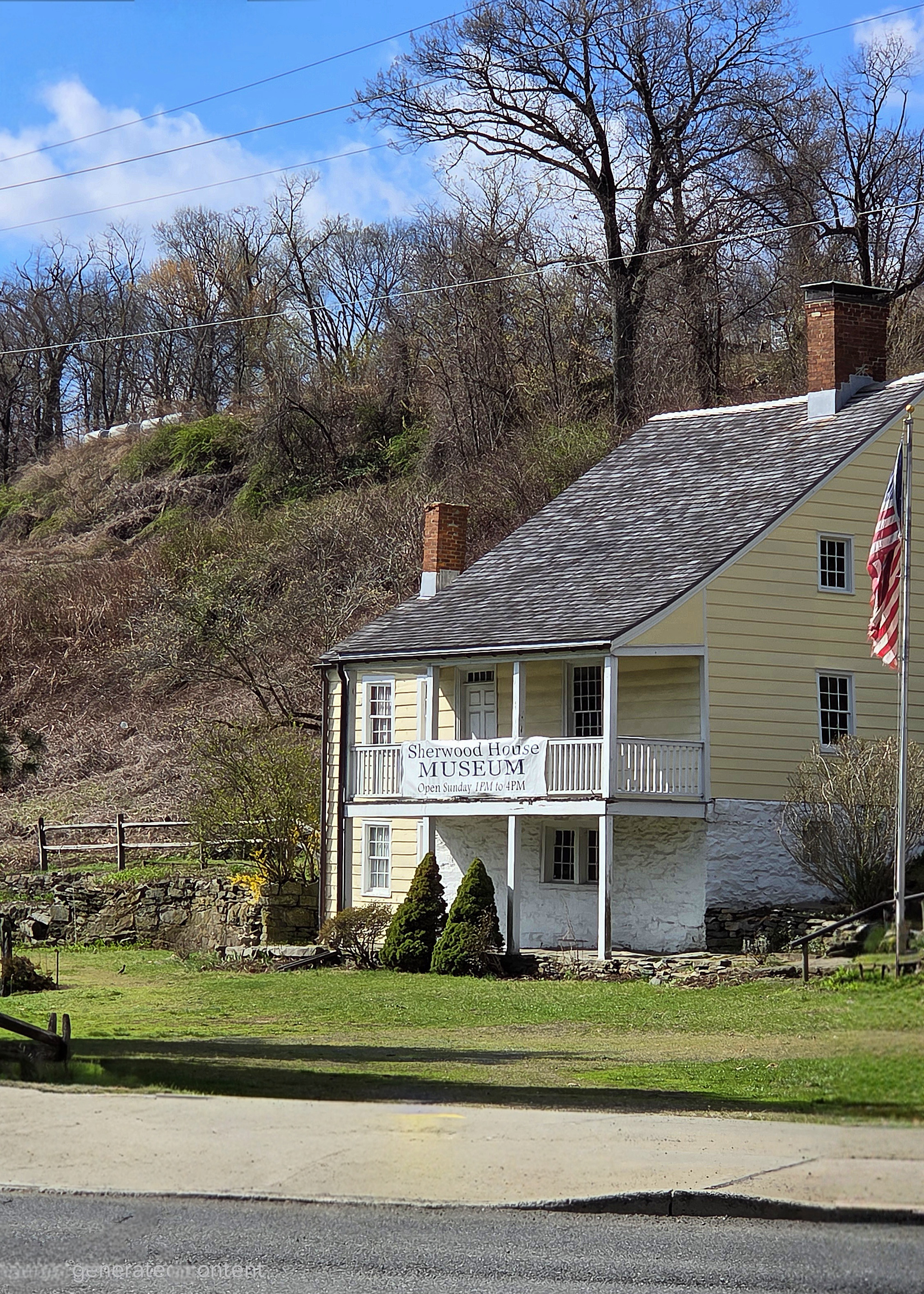
Yonkers: Sherwood House

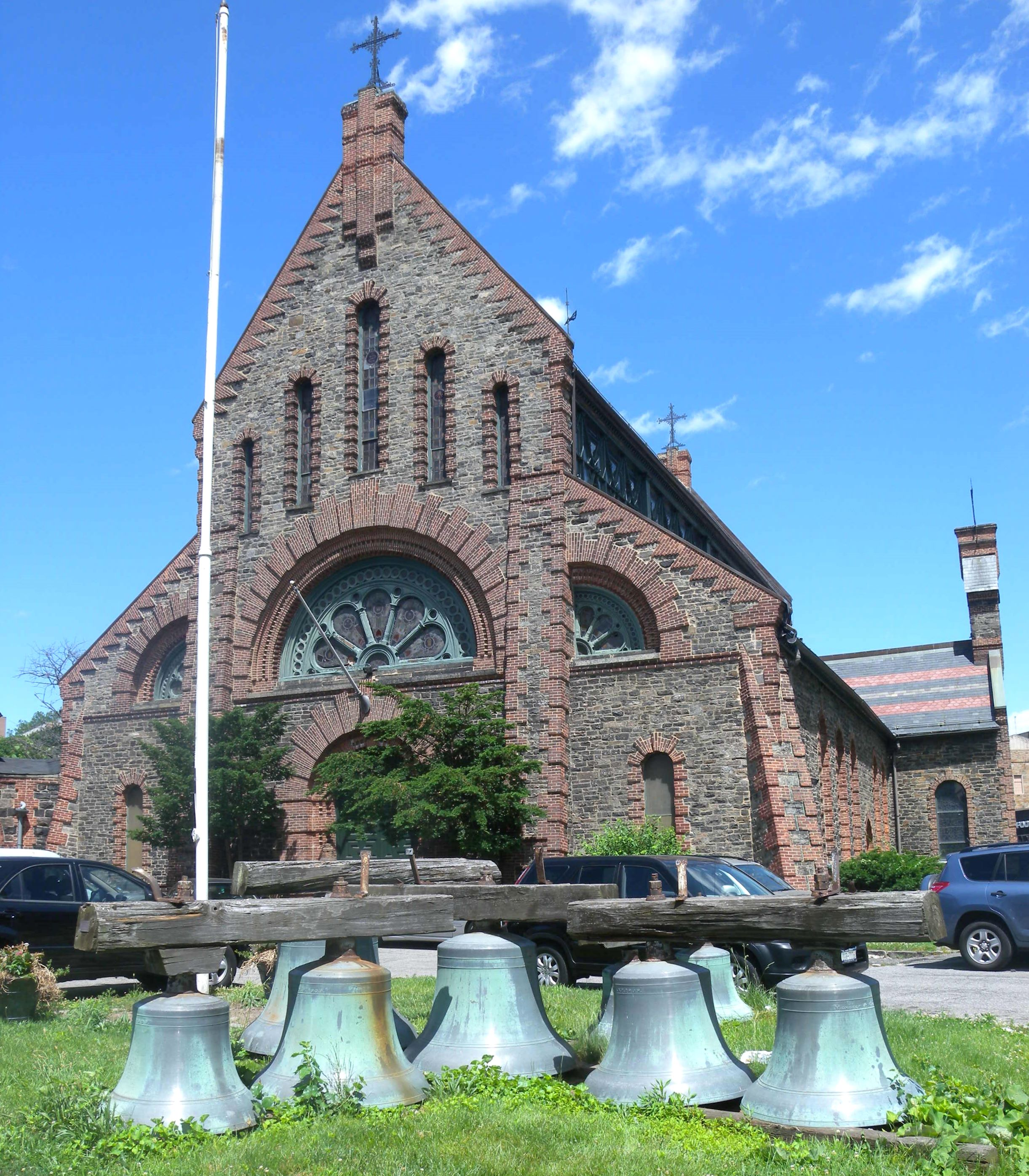
Yonkers: St. John's Protestant Episcopal Church

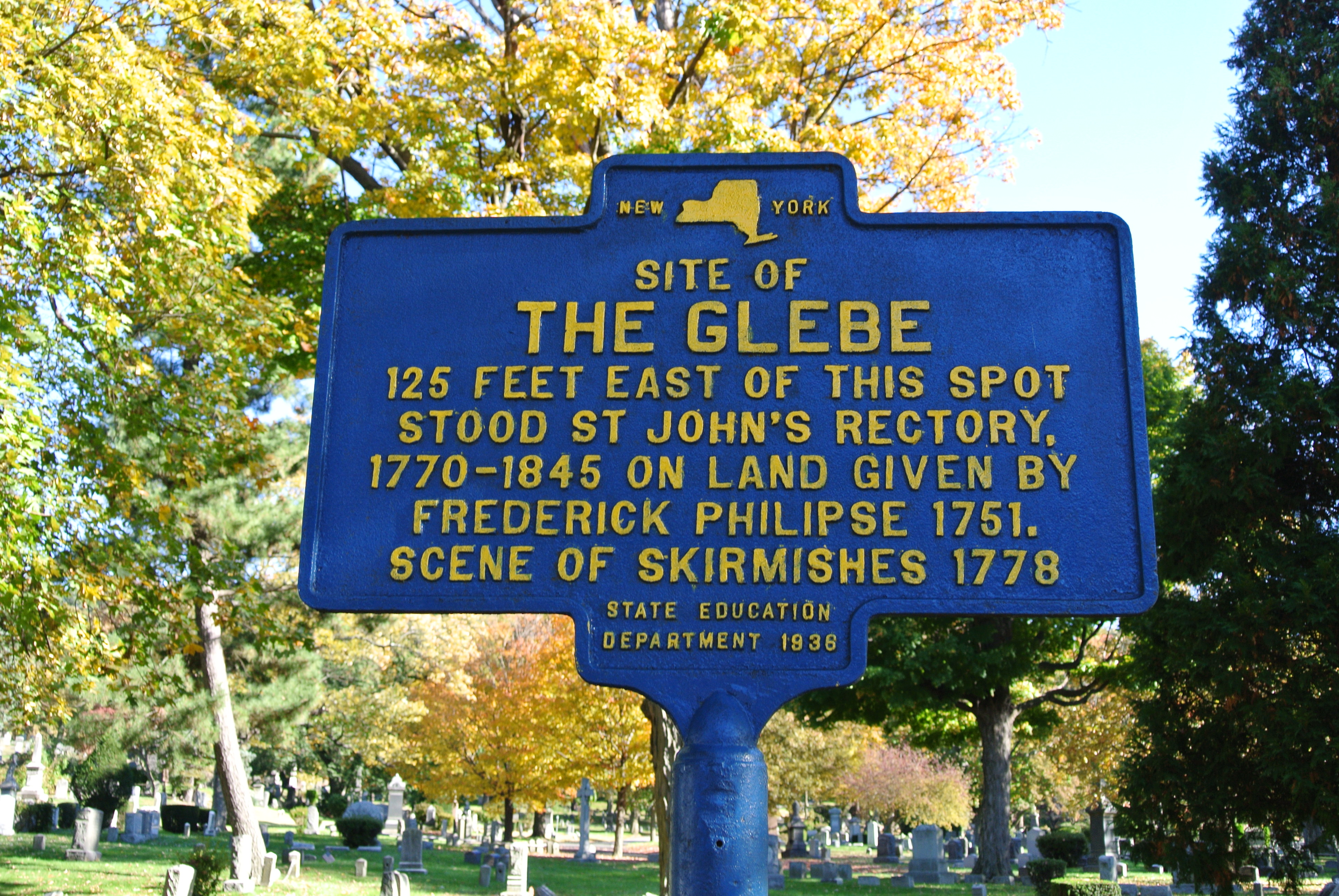
Yonkers: The Site of the Glebe marker

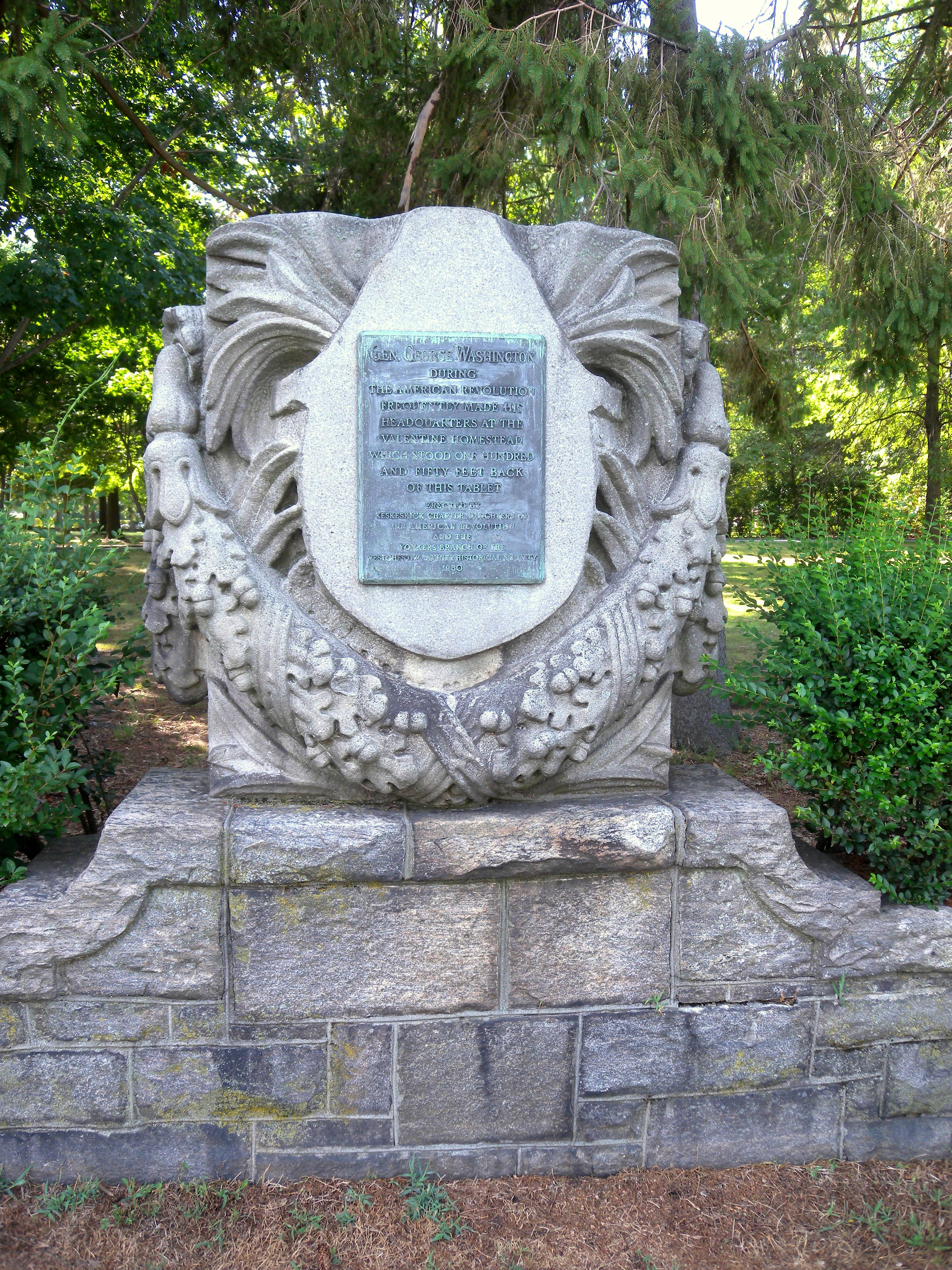
Yonkers: Valentine Hill Monument

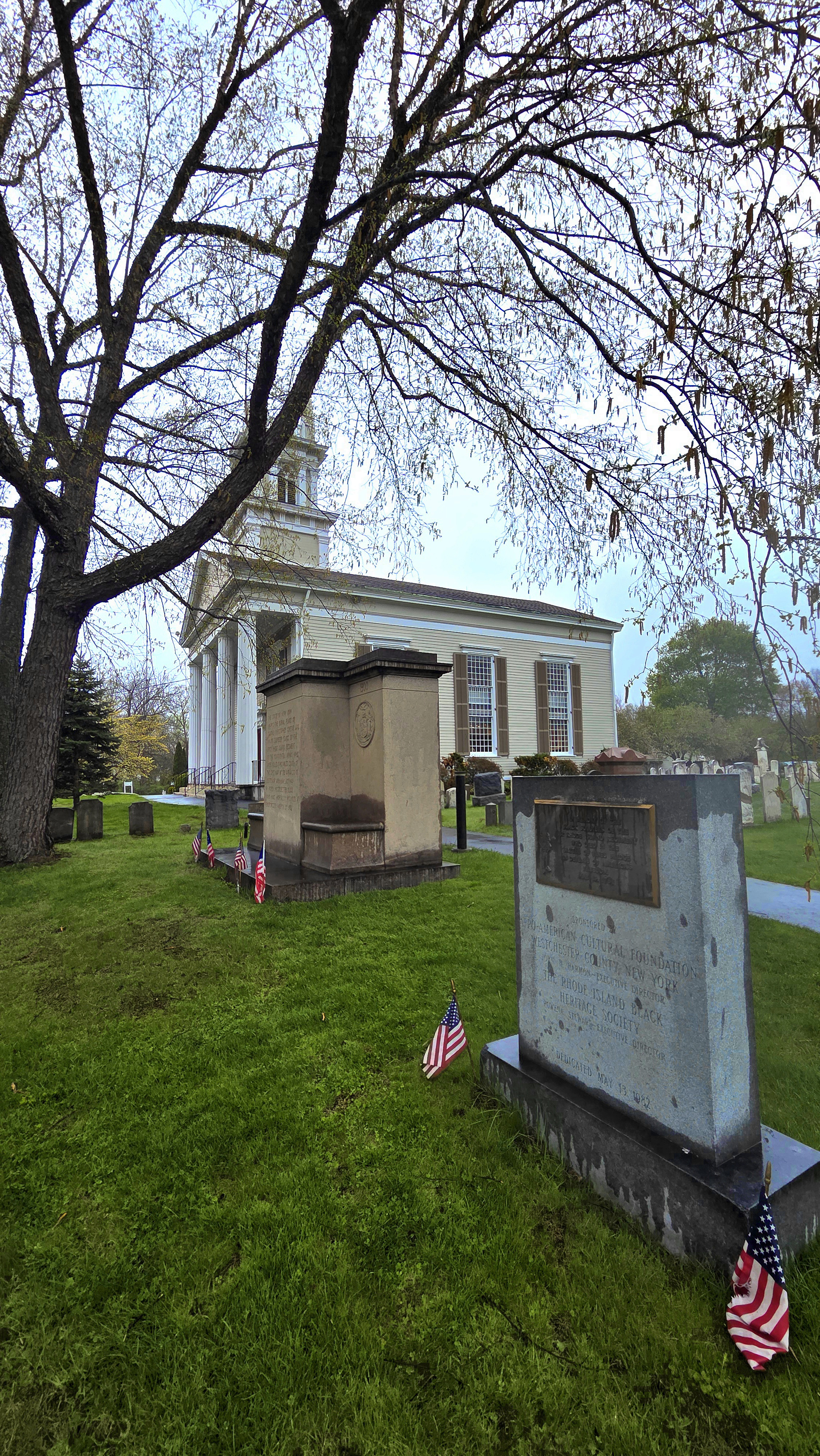
Yorktown: Grave marker (center) and Monument to 1st Rhode Island

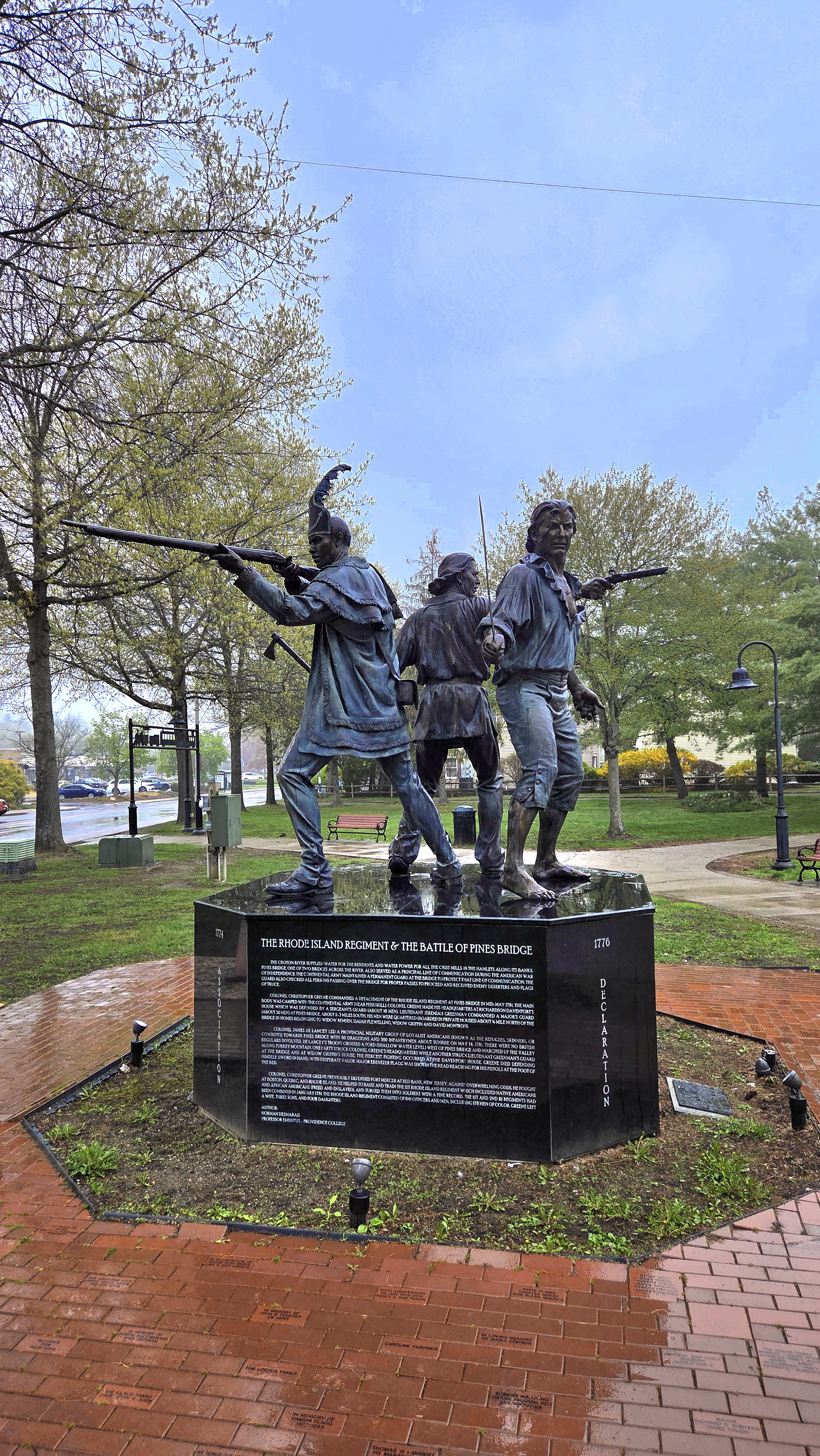
Yorktown: Pines Bridge Monument

1. Ardsley
Continental Troops marker (near Ardsley High School, 300 Farm Rd.). Marks the site of the Continental Army camp during the 1781 Philipsburg Encampment of allied American and French forces.
Grand Reconnaissance marker (Heatherdell Rd. & Saw Mill River Rd.). Marks the starting point of the Grand Reconnaissance, a large-scale French-American scouting mission undertaken during the Philipsburg Encampment.

2. Armonk
Smith Tavern (440 Bedford Rd.). The current building was likely constructed around the remnants of the original tavern, which was burned by the British troops. The local militia was headquartered there in 1779. The owner, a Quaker named Benjamin Hopkins, sheltered there "the poor and homeless" who fled from British-occupied New York City early in the war. The building is part of the Smith Tavern Educational Complex.

3. Briarcliff Manor
Sparta Cemetery (181 Revolutionary Rd.). A bronze plaque installed on the Ladew family plot reads: "This stone was pierced by a cannon shot fired from the British sloop-of-war Vulture commanded by Lieut. Sutherland, September 1780." The cemetery is also the final resting place of Moses Sherwood, one of the soldiers who fired at HMS Vulture during the Teller's Point engagement of September 21, 1780.

4. Cortlandt
1777 Skirmish marker (Donnelly Place & Oregon Rd., Cortlandt Manor). The inscription reads: "In this area, on March 24, 1777, American troops under Lt. Col. Marinus Willett turned back 200 British invaders." The skirmish took place after the destruction of Camp Peekskill.
Gallows Hill Memorial Boulder (Gallows Hill Rd., Cortlandt Manor). A commemorative plaque on the boulder marks the spot where General Israel Putnam executed British spy Edmund Palmer in 1777.
Old St. Peter's Church and Old Van Cortlandtville Cemetery (Oregon Rd. & Locust Ave., Cortlandt Manor). George Washington attended the church when he stayed at Van Cortlandt Upper Manor House. The church building also served as a field hospital for Rochambeau's French troops. Its churchyard contains graves of John Paulding, 8 French soldiers, and 44 American soldiers, with memorial markers. General Seth Pomeroy (who died in nearby Peekskill en route to support Washington's army with Massachusetts militia reinforcements) was also buried in the cemetery, in an unmarked grave, the exact location of which is unknown. He is memorialized by the Seth Pomeroy/Jeremiah Drake marker at the entrance to the cemetery, Pomeroy Anvil Monument in the cemetery (also commemorating other prominent family members), and Seth Pomeroy Monument in the adjacent Hillside Cemetery.
Post Hannock House marker (238 Kings Ferry Rd., Montrose). The inscription reads: "Owner operated Kings Ferry 1664, Colonel Livingston’s Headquarters, 1781. Washington presented medals to the captors of Major Andre here in 1782."
Taylor Tavern marker (Oregon Rd. & Gallows Hill Rd., Cortlandt Manor). The inscription reads: "Taylor Tavern Site. Built in 1750. New York – Albany Stagecoach stop. Major John Andre held here on Sept. 25, 1780. Later Dusenbury Tavern."
Van Cortlandt Family Plot (Hillside Cemetery,1033 Oregon Rd., Cortlandt Manor). Identified on the roadside marker as "final resting place of ... backers of American independence."
Van Cortlandt Upper Manor House (110 Oregon Rd., Cortlandt Manor). Served as a refuge for Pierre Van Cortlandt's family, who had to abandon the main Van Cortlandt Manor house, which was threatened (and later ransacked) by the British army. The Upper Manor House also served as George Washington's headquarters in November 1776, November 1779, and June-July 1781.

5. Croton-on-Hudson
Jack Peterson Memorial (Croton Point Park, 1 Croton Point Park Ave.). The inscription on the boulder-mounted memorial says: "Commemorating the defense of Teller's Point by George Sherwood and John Jack Peterson who repulsed the landing of British troops from the "Vulture" September 21, 1780, aiding in the capture of Major Andre."
Van Cortlandt Manor House (525 S. Riverside Ave.). The house and property served as a headquarters for commanding officers of the Continental Army and a supply center for the army.

6. Eastview
Hammond House (1 Hammond House Rd.). In the summer of 1780, Washington visited the house for a brief conference with the owner, John Hammond, Westchester militia commander, leaving shortly before the house was surrounded by Loyalist militia or British troops. (Private residence; can be visited by appointment.)
John Dean Rock (bank of Saw Mill River next to North County Trailway). This large rock outcrop served as a refuge for Sgt. John Dean during the local militia's guerrilla-style raids against the British and Loyalist units. (The rock is unmarked.)

7. Harrison
Merritt Hill marker and memorial cannon (Oak Lake St. & Lake St.). Marker inscriptions describe action on Merritt (or Merritt's) Hill, which was part of the site of the Battle of White Plains. The cannon, mounted on a boulder, is located on the slope of the hill.

8. Hartsdale
Odell House Rochambeau Headquarters (425 Ridge Rd.). From July 6 to August 18, 1781, the house and surrounding farmland served as the headquarters of Count de Rochambeau and his expeditionary force. It is now a public museum.

9. Hastings-on-Hudson
Battle of Edgar's Lane markers (edge of Zinsser Park; intersection of Broadway/U.S. 9 & Edgar's Lane). The two markers are located on opposite ends of the site where the battle was fought.
Forge Cottage (near 383–389 Broadway). Contains remnants of the "Neutral Forge," a Revolutionary War-era blacksmith shop where horses from both American and British forces were shod. (Private property; an interpretative panel is near the entrance to the property.)
Post-Baker House (532 Broadway). It was built by Peter Post, a tenant farmer who reportedly played a crucial role in the American victory at the Battle of Edgar's Lane. (Private residence, with a historical marker.)
Revolutionary Walk (Sheldon Wagner Park, Broadway & Warburton Ave.). Features several interpretive panels describing the events related to the 1778 Battle of Edgar's Lane.

10. Mamaroneck
Skirmish of Heathcote Hill marker (Fenimore Rd. & Cortlandt Ave.). It marks the location where 750 Americans attacked 400 Loyalist Queen's Rangers on October 22, 1776, in the Battle of Mamaroneck, also known as the Skirmish of Heathcote Hill.

11. Mount Kisco
Meeting of Washington & Rochambeau tablet (East Main St. (NY 117) & South Bedford Rd.). The boulder-mounted bronze plaque commemorates the first meeting of Washington and Rochambeau at the 1781 Philipsburg Encampment of allied American and French forces.
Rochambeau Farm marker (near Guard Hill Road). Marks the site of one of the camps of Rochambeau's French expeditionary corps on the way to the 1781 Philipsburg Encampment.
St. Mark's Cemetery (East Main St./NY 117 & St. Mark's Place). The cemetery features a stone-mounted "St. George's Church" tablet stating that a church that stood here was used by American forces as a hospital following the Battle of White Plains in 1776 and also served as a British base in 1779. Patriot soldiers who died on the battlefield and in the hospital were buried in the southeast corner of this churchyard, often in unmarked graves.
Washington Rock marker (639 Main St.). According to folklore passed down for generations, Washington and his officers rested on this rock while the American troops were retreating from the Battle of White Plains toward Peekskill. After being lost to history for decades, the site was rediscovered and verified by the Mount Kisco Historical Society in 2015.

12. Mount Vernon
Saint Paul's Church National Historic Site (897 South Columbus Ave.). The then-unfinished church served as a field hospital for Americans before the Battle of Pell's Point and for Hessians after the battle. Its cemetery contains graves of Revolutionary War soldiers, with a marker listing some of the known names. It also contains a mass grave of Hessian soldiers who died in the field hospital, with a memorial marker.
"Brom" Dyckman marker (West 1st St. & South 11th Ave.). Located near the old Scott's Bridge, where the Westchester guide Abraham "Brom" Dyckman was mortally wounded by a Loyalist sniper on March 4, 1782.
Glover's Brigade Memorial (East Sandford Blvd. & Garden Ave.). This stone memorial, with a plaque, is located on the site of the Battle of Pell's Point. The inscription reads: "On the adjacent hillside "Glover’s Brigade" of the Continental Army camped October 17, 1776, engaging in the Battle at Pelham Manor the following day."
Site of Fowler's Tavern marker (South Columbus Ave. at South Third Ave.). Built In 1733, the tavern was where the local militia gathered in 1776.
Site of Morrell's Tavern marker (North Columbus Ave., just north of Sherman Ave.). Commemorates a skirmish that occurred on October 23, 1776, resulting in the deaths of ten Hessian soldiers and one American soldier.

13. New Rochelle
Lewis Pintard House (50 Pintard Ave.). Home of local merchant and Patriot Lewis Pintard, who was appointed by the Continental Congress as commissary for American prisoners of war held in New York City, providing them with food and other necessities with the consent of the British.

14. North White Plains
Elijah Miller House (140 Virginia Rd.). The house was used by George Washington as a command post during the Battle of White Plains. Now a historic house museum, it showcases the table where Washington dined and the desk where he planned battles.
Miller Hill Battle Monument and Miller Hill marker (Miller Hill Park, Dunlap Way). The inscription on the monument reads: "Following the engagement on Chatterton Hill Washington's army retired to new lines extending east from this point. These earthworks protected the right wing of Washington's army." The inscription on the marker reads: "Shots fired from this hill Nov. 4, 1776 by Col. John Glover's troops ended Battle of White Plains and turned tide of revolution." Remnants of protective earthworks can still be seen at Miller Hill.

15. Peekskill
Fort Hill Park (500 Decatur Ave.). Features remnants of Gen. William Heath's 1776 Eastern redoubt. There are several interpretative plaques detailing the history of the Continental Army's Camp Peekskill.
America's Most Famous Cannon (in front of Peekskill Museum/Herrick House, 124 Union Ave.). It is a 1,100-pound cannon mounted on a base with a plaque describing the September 1780 attack on the British HMS Vulture.
Birdsall House plaque (970 Main St.). Marks the site of the Birdsall House, which served as military headquarters for three Continental Army generals between 1776 and 1778.

16. Port Chester
Bush-Lyon Homestead (479 King St.). Served as the headquarters for General Israel Putnam during the winter of 1777–1778 and is now a historic house museum.
Historic Village of Port Chester marker (edge of Liberty Square). The marker notes that Liberty Square was a site for mustering soldiers during the Revolutionary War.

17. Pound Ridge
Battle of Pound Ridge Monument (Westchester Ave. & West Ln., Pound Ridge Historic District). Commemorates the defense of the hamlet of Poundridge by Continental Army soldiers and local militia during the 1779 raid by the British forces under Banastre Tarleton.
Ebenezer Lockwood House (253 Westchester Ave., Pound Ridge Historic District). The house of the local militia commander was used as headquarters for Col. Elisha Sheldon's cavalry regiment and a field hospital during the battle; it was burned by the British and rebuilt by Lockwood after the war from the barn on the site.

18. Rye
Widow Haviland's Tavern, also known as Square House Museum (1 Purchase St.). Operating as an inn and tavern during the American Revolution under Dr. Ebenezer Haviland—a leader of local Patriots and Continental Army surgeon—it served both as a lodging for travelers and as a meeting place for supporters of the Continental Congress. As a museum, the building is interpreted as a 1770s–1780s tavern operated by Dr. Haviland and later by his widow.

19. Scarsdale
Griffen-Fish House (31 Mamaroneck Rd.). British General William Howe used the home as his headquarters before and during the Battle of White Plains. Its position on a hill provided a strategic vantage point for observing troop movements. (The house is a private residence; a historical marker is located on the sidewalk in front of the property.)
French Camp marker (Underhill & Clayton Rd.). Marks the site of Rochambeau's army camp during the 1781 Philipsburg Encampment.
Wayside Cottage, formerly Wayside Inn (1039 Post Rd.). One of the oldest preserved residences in Westchester County. The plaque reads: "For many years, before and after the Revolutionary War, a country tavern. During that long struggle for independence, a meeting place for Scarsdale Patriots and the scene of repeated attacks by British soldiers." (Now a community resource, it features a restored room showcasing colonial-era life.)

20. Sleepy Hollow
Revolutionary Soldiers' Monument (Sleepy Hollow Cemetery, 540 North Broadway). The obelisk stands on Battle Hill, where an American redoubt was located in 1779, protecting a strategic Albany Post Road crossing over the Pocantico River. A Revolutionary War cannon is positioned in the same spot where a cannon was trained during the war to defend the crossing.
Old Dutch Church and Burying Ground (430 North Broadway, adjacent to Sleepy Hollow Cemetery). On July 2, 1781, George Washington and his army made a stop at the church before an attempted surprise attack on British outposts at Kingsbridge. The troops rested near the church "till dusk," before continuing their march overnight. (The attempt at surprise failed, as the American troops were spotted by the British.) The Burying Ground is the final resting place of many local Revolutionary War heroes, including Col. John Odell and Sgt. John Dean.

21. Tarrytown
Captors' Monument and marker (North Broadway, at entrance to Patriot's Park). Located in the immediate vicinity of the spot where British intelligence officer Major John André was captured in 1780 by local militiamen.
Earth Redoubt marker (89 Church St.). The inscription reads: "Earth redoubt constructed in Revolution, from here the local water guard cannonaded British sloop Vulture returning from Andre-Arnold meeting."
The Action at Tarrytown tablet (near Tarrytown Station, Depot Plaza). Set into a stone base, the bronze tablet commemorates the July 15, 1781, naval engagement on the Hudson River known as the Action at Tarrytown. (In the 1780s, the spot where the plaque is now located was roughly 200 feet out into the Hudson; the Tarrytown Station and the area around it were built on land reclaimed from the river during the construction of the Hudson River Railroad.)

22. Tuckahoe
Ward House (230 White Plains Rd.). The home of local Patriot leader Stephen Ward, it was a crucial intelligence post during the war; it also briefly served as British headquarters shortly before the Battle of White Plains. Notable military engagements took place at Ward House on October 23, 1776, and March 16, 1777. It was burned by British troops in 1778, but was rebuilt in the early 1790s to its original specifications, with a rebuilt version still standing today.

23. Valhalla
Battle of Young's House Memorial (Grasslands Rd. & Sprain Brook Parkway). A stone memorial marks the mass grave of Continental and British soldiers killed at the Battle of Young's House (Youngs Corners). The inscription reads: "Here rest the remains of Soldiers of the Continental Army who fell February 3, 1780 in the gallant defence of Young’s Corners. Buried with several of their opponents in this vicinity. They are interred on the field of conflict beneath this memorial."
Reuben Wright's Mill Monument and marker (Mount Kisco Rd./Route 22, ca. 0.5 miles north of Old Orchard St.). The monument consists of historic millstones; both the monument and the nearby roadside marker commemorate the site of the mills that served as the headquarters for Washington on July 20-25, 1778, and for other American generals during the war. The original mills were located in Old Kensico Village, which was later submerged during the creation of the Kensico Reservoir.

24. Verplanck
Verplanck's Point memorials and plaques (Cortlandt Waterfront Park, Riverview Ave.). "Fort Lafayette" plaque marks the location of the fort captured by the British in 1779. "In Grateful Remembrance" memorial boulder bears a plaque dedicated to American and French soldiers who crossed the Hudson River at King’s Ferry in 1781. "Washington at Verplanck’s Point" stone-mounted plaque highlights the 1782 Grand Encampment of the Continental Army, where Washington greeted the French army following the victory at Yorktown. There are also multiple interpretive signs detailing the events related to the crucial King's Ferry crossing to Stony Point. (The view from the park across the river remains much the same as it did during the Revolutionary War.)

25. White Plains
Battle of White Plains Park, also known as Battle Hill Park (corner of Whitney St. and Battle Ave.). Located directly on the historic Chatterton Hill, the park preserves a portion of the high ground where the fiercest fighting of the Battle of White Plains occurred on October 28, 1776. It features a memorial (replica) cannon mounted on a boulder with a plaque, as well as several interpretive signs and historical boards. A small Soldiers Monument (at the base of the hill) honors the soldiers from both the American and Hessian forces who fought on this ground.
Center of Washington's Army Monument (near 101 North Broadway). It is an authentic Revolutionary War-era mortar sitting atop a rough-hewn stone taken from nearby Mount Misery–a historic hill that was a strategic American defensive site during the Battle of White Plains. The monument marks "the final stand by General Washington at the end of his long retreat, the abandonment by Gen. Howe of his purpose to capture the American Army and the revival of the hopes for national Independence."
Jacob Purdy House (60 Park Ave.). Served as George Washington's headquarters on two separate occasions during the war. Now home to the White Plains Historical Society, its historical exhibits include period furniture, household tools, and copies of letters written by Washington during his stay.

26. Yonkers
Camping Ground marker (Westchester Hills School 29, 475 Kneeland Ave.). The marker is on the grounds of the present-day school, which was the site where Washington's troops camped on October 28, 1776, just prior to the Battle of White Plains.
Colonial Roads markers (along Sprain Rd. and Mile Square Rd., Yonkers/Greenburgh). Designate the routes used by American forces before and after the Battle of White Plains.
Camping Ground marker (Seminary Ave. & Mile Square Rd.). Notes this area as a camping ground/staging area used by both American and British forces during the war.
Philipse Manor Hall (29 Warburton Ave., Getty Square). The mansion was a key Loyalist hub, location of British army temporary headquarters and encampments, and the site where the 1779 Philipsburg Proclamation was issued. It is now a museum exploring the diverse experiences and complex loyalties of the Revolutionary era.
St. John's Protestant Episcopal Church (1 Hudson St., Getty Square). The church served as a field hospital for both sides. An exterior plaque honors "all American Revolution soldiers buried in Saint John's Church Cemetery." Inside the church, there is a memorial plaque for Reverend Luke Babcock, the rector who was a Loyalist arrested by Patriots.
Sherwood House (340 Tuckahoe Rd.). A pre-Revolutionary tenant farmhouse built circa 1740 on the land of Philipsburg Manor. It was owned by Thomas Sherwood, who served as an ensign for the New York militia during the Revolution. General Washington widened a Native American trail near the house in 1776 for the Continental Army to pass; it has become the present-day Tuckahoe Road.
The Site of the Glebe marker (St. John's Cemetery, Saw Mill River Rd. & Axminster St.). Marks the location of St. John's Rectory and the scene of skirmishes in 1779.
Valentine Hill Monument and marker (near 201 Seminary Ave.). Both the stone monument and the nearby marker commemorate George Washington's headquarters at the site of the former Thomas Valentine homestead, which he used several times during the war, most notably in October 1776 before the Battle of White Plains and in July 1781 during the Grand Reconnaissance.

27. Yorktown
Crompond Presbyterian Burying Ground (near First Presbyterian Church of Yorktown, 2880 Crompond Rd., Yorktown Heights). It features the Burial Place Marker for commanding officers of the 1st Rhode Island Regiment (killed in 1781 by De Lancey's Refugees at the Battle of Pine's Bridge) as well as for Westchester guide Abraham "Brom" Dyckman (killed in 1782 during a raid against De Lancey). Near the burial place marker is the Monument to 1st Rhode Island Regiment, honoring "the predominantly Black soldiers of the First Rhode Island Regiment who fought for freedom and died at the Battle of Pines Bridge." Also on the grounds is the Presbyterian Church marker, stating that the original church served as a Continental Army arsenal during the Revolution and was burned by the British in 1779.
Davenport House/Davenport Inn (648 Croton Heights Rd., Yorktown Heights). It is the original house that was the focal point of the Battle of Pine's Lane. (It is a private dwelling, with a historical marker nearby.)
French Hill marker (on the grounds of French Hill School, 2051 Baldwin Rd., Yorktown Heights). Located within the historic area, now called the French Hill, where the French forces under Rochambeau encamped twice during the war, in 1781 and 1782.
Old Croton River Crossing marker (north side of NY Route 100 Bridge over New Croton Reservoir). Marks the submerged site of the historic Pine's Bridge.
Pines Bridge Monument (Railroad Park, Yorktown Heights). A three-figure heroic bronze sculpture devoted to the 1781 defense of Pine's Bridge by the 1st Rhode Island Regiment; it depicts Col. Christopher Greene, an African American soldier, and a Native American soldier.

== See also ==
- History of Westchester County
- Northern theater of the American Revolutionary War after Saratoga
- List of Washington's Headquarters during the Revolutionary War
- Washington–Rochambeau Revolutionary Route
- National Register of Historic Places listings in Westchester County, New York

== Annotated bibliography ==
- Between 1844 and 1851, White Plains attorney and local historian John MacLean Macdonald interviewed hundreds of elderly Westchester County residents about their experiences in the Neutral Ground. The Macdonald Interviews, a collection of 407 first-hand accounts, now held by the Westchester County Historical Society, is considered a vital oral history of the era.
- Westchester County, New York, During the American Revolution, by Henry B. Dawson, is a foundational 19th-century scholarly text written in 1886 by the editor of the Historical Magazine.
- Souvenir of the Revolutionary Soldiers' Monument Dedication at Tarrytown, N.Y., a 1894 commemorative book by local newspaper publisher Marcius D. Raymond, contains invaluable historical information on the families whose names are inscribed on the Revolutionary Soldiers' Monument in Sleepy Hollow Cemetery, as well as related war events.
- Westchester County during the American Revolution, 1775-1783, by Otto Hufeland, originally published in 1926, is widely regarded as a classic, foundational history of the Neutral Ground.
- The Revolutionary War "Neutral Ground" of Westchester County, by Dr. Sung Bok Kim, in the Journal of American History; this 1993 article by a prominent historian of colonial and Revolutionary America is highly regarded by scholars for its analysis of political shifts and civilian suffering.
- Westchester County in the American Revolution: Neutral Ground, by Stephen Paul DeVillo. This recent work is a comprehensive modern study detailing the partisan warfare, espionage (including the Arnold-André conspiracy), and the Westchester guides.
