= The Partisan in War =

Pamphlet written by Andreas Emmerich

The Partisan in War; or the use of a corps of light troops to an army is a pamphlet written by the German soldier Andreas Emmerich (Emmerick). It is a treatise on light infantry tactics learned by Emmerich in the Seven Years' War and in the American Revolutionary War. The treatise was dedicated in 1789 to Prince Frederick, Duke of York and Albany; the same year it was first published in English in London. This work detailed the tactics of light troops—such as reconnaissance, ambush, and skirmishing—which were essential to 18th-century warfare.

Andreas Emmerich (1739-1809) was born near Hanau in Germany. His name is spelled Emmerick in period English-language sources. As a soldier, he served in Germany and England in various light cavalry units. During the Seven Years' War, Emmerich served under Duke Ferdinand of Brunswick. During the American Revolutionary War, he fought for the British as commander of Emmerich's Chasseurs, which participated in guerrilla warfare waged in the "Neutral Ground" of Westchester County. Emmerich joined the Danish army in 1788 and rose to the rank of lieutenant-general. He was executed by occupying French Napoleonic forces in 1809 after leading an anti-French rising at Marburg.

== See also ==
- Partisan (military)
