= Historic sites in Westchester County =

There are numerous nationally and locally designated historic sites and attractions in Westchester County. These include architecturally significant manors and estates, churches, cemeteries, farmhouses, African-American heritage sites, and Underground Railroad depots and waystations. There are sites from pre-Revolutionary and Revolutionary times, as well as battlegrounds. Westchester County also played an important role in the development of the modern suburb, and there are many associated heritage sites and museums.

Some of these landmarks have earned distinction as members of other notable designations including the Hudson River Valley National Heritage Area list. Still others are on New York State's Path Through History or Westchester County's African American Heritage Trail.

== National Historic Site ==
National Historic Site (NHSes) are officially recognized areas of nationally historic significance in the United States. They are usually owned and managed by the federal government.

- Saint Paul's Church National Historic Site, Mount Vernon

== National Historic Landmark District ==
A National Historic Landmark District (NHLD) is a geographical area that has received recognition from the United States Government that the buildings, landscapes, cultural features and archaeological resources within it are of the highest significance and worthy of preservation. The Boston Post Road Historic District (Rye, New York) is Westchester County's only National Historic Landmark District. It is composed of 5 properties including

- The Jay Cemetery, Rye
- Jay Estate including the 1838 Peter Augustus Jay Mansion, Rye
- Lounsbury
- Marshlands Conservancy, Rye
- Rye Golf Club including Whitby Castle, Rye

It is one of only 11 NHLDs in all of New York State. There are just over 100 National Historic Landmark Districts in the entire United States.

== National Historic Landmarks ==
According to the National Park Service "National Historic Landmarks (NHLs) are historic properties that illustrate the heritage of the United States. The over 2,600 NHLs found in the U.S. today come in many forms: historic buildings, sites, structures, objects, and districts. Each NHL represents an outstanding aspect of American history and culture." There are 19 NHLs in Westchester County

- Armour-Stiner House, Irvington
- Edwin H. Armstrong House (Withdrawal of Designation - 03/05/86), Yonkers
- Aaron Copland House, Cortlandt Manor
- John W. Draper House, Hastings-on-Hudson
- Elephant Hotel, Somers
- John Hartford House, Valhalla
- John Jay Homestead, Katonah
- Kykuit, also known as the John D. Rockefeller Estate, Pocantico Hills
- Lyndhurst, Tarrytown
- Old Croton Aqueduct, Croton
- Old Dutch Church, Sleepy Hollow
- Philipsburg Manor House, Sleepy Hollow
- Philipse Manor Hall State Historic Site, Yonkers
- Playland, Rye
- Stepping Stones - Historic Home of Bill & Lois Wilson (Stepping Stones Foundation)
- Sunnyside, Tarrytown
- Thomas Paine Cottage, New Rochelle
- Van Cortlandt Manor, Croton-on-Hudson
- Villa Lewaro, Irvington

== National Register of Historic Places listings ==
Including the 19 NHLs listed above, there are 240 total sites in Westchester County that are listed on the National Register of Historic Places. See also National Register of Historic Places listings in Westchester County, New York, National Register of Historic Places listings in northern Westchester County, New York. A partial list follows:

- Rye African-American Cemetery, Rye
- Bar Building
- Bird Homestead, Rye
- Bolton Priory
- Evangeline Booth House
- Bronx River Parkway
- Bronxville Women's Club, Bronxville
- Bush Lyon Homestead, Port Chester
- The Capitol Theatre, Port Chester
- Caramoor Center for Music and the Arts, Katonah
- Child Welfare Association of Mamaroneck, Mamaroneck
- Church of St. Barnabas
- Church of St. Joseph of Arimathea, Greenburgh
- Jasper F. Cropsey House and Studio, Hastings-on-Hudson
- East Irvington School
- Edgewood House
- Ferncliff Cemetery, Hartsdale
- Glen Island Park and Glen Island Harbour Club (formerly the Glen Island Casino)
- Irvington Town Hall Theater, Irvington
- Jacob Burns Film Center, Pleasantville
- Old St. Peter's Church, Cortlandt
- Paramount Center for the Arts, Peekskill
- The Picture House, Pelham
- The Performing Arts Center, Purchase
- Sing Sing Prison, Ossining
- The Square House Museum, Rye
- Tarrytown Music Hall, Tarrytown
- Union Church of Pocantico Hills, Pocantico Hills
- Yonkers Raceway, Yonkers

== African American Heritage Trail of Westchester County ==
- African American Cemetery, Rye
- Captain's Cottage, Home of Captain Lewis Brady, Sparta
- Ella Fitzgerald Bronze Statue, Yonkers
- Enslaved Africans' Raingarden, Yonkers
- Foster Memorial AME Zion Church, Tarrytown
- Friends Meeting House, Chappaqua
- Jay Estate, Rye
- John Jay Homestead, Katonah
- Lee’s Funeral Home, White Plains
- Lincoln Park, New Rochelle
- Monument to 1st Rhode Island Regiment, Yorktown Heights
- Neuberger Museum of Art, Purchase
- Jack Peterson Memorial, Croton
- Philipsburg Manor House, Sleepy Hollow
- Philipse Manor Hall State Historic Site, Yonkers
- Rising Sun Golf & Country Club (now Hudson Hills Golf Course), Ossining
- Saint Frances AME Zion Church, Port Chester
- Saint Paul's Church National Historic Site, Mount Vernon
- Stony Hill Cemetery, Harrison
- Villa Lewaro, Irvington

== Local landmarks ==
Some historic sites may be eligible for the National Register of Historic Places but have not yet been nominated or may never be nominated. Others are governed by local landmark laws.

== Historic battle sites ==
- Battle Hill, White Plains

== Historic house museums ==
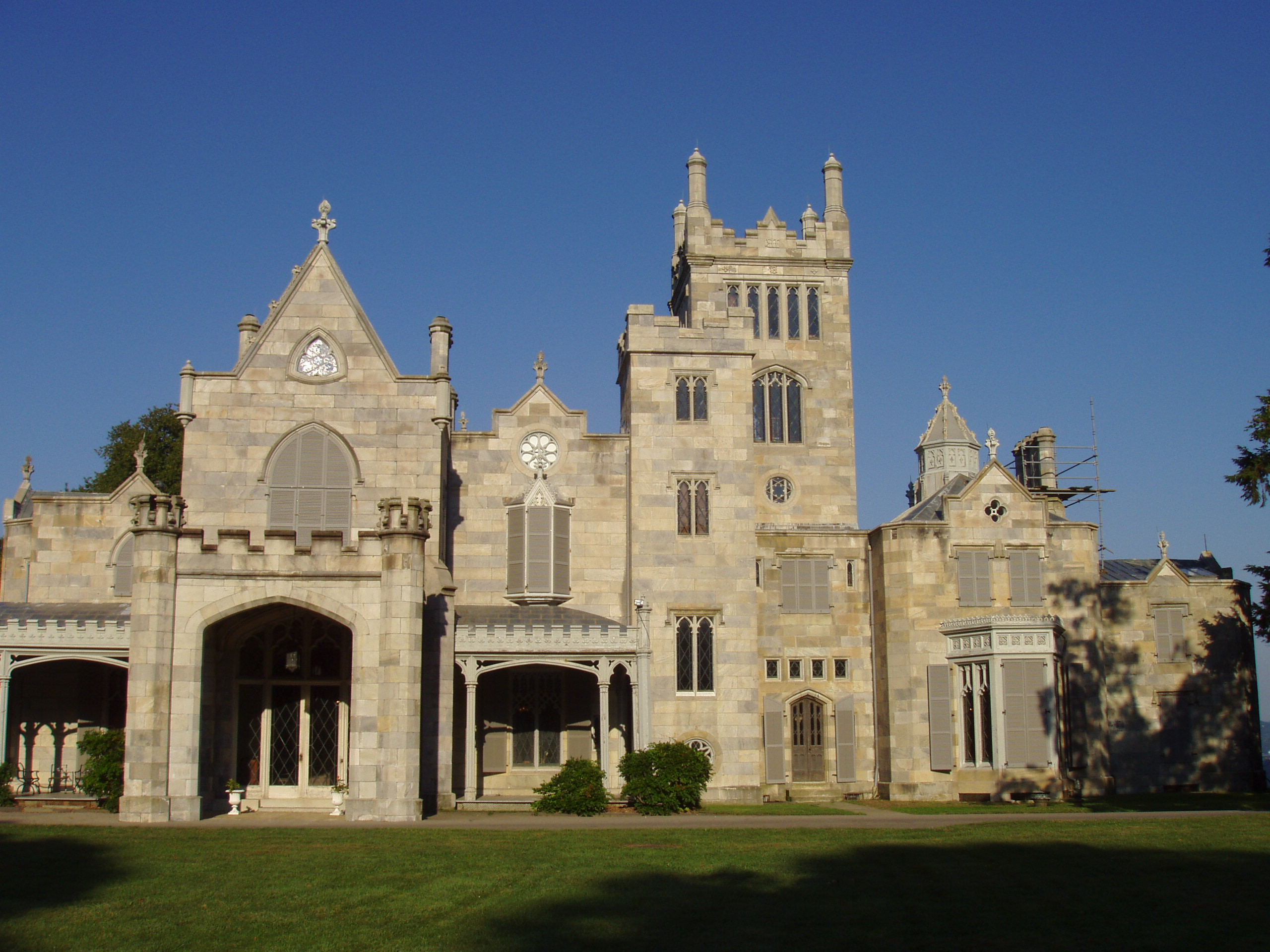
Lyndhurst, home of Jay Gould in Tarrytown.

- 1838 Peter Augustus Jay House, Rye
- Timothy Knapp House and Milton Cemetery, Rye
- Kykuit, Pocantico Hills
- Leland Castle, New Rochelle
- Lyndhurst, Tarrytown
- Thomas Paine Cottage, New Rochelle
- Jacob Purdy House, White Plains
- Odell House Rochambeau Headquarters, Hartsdale

== Monuments ==
- Monument to 1st Rhode Island Regiment

== Museums ==
- Hudson River Museum, Yonkers
- Thomas Paine Memorial Museum, New Rochelle

== See also ==
- Historic Hudson Valley
- History of Westchester County
- Neutral Ground of Westchester County in the Revolutionary War
- National Register of Historic Places listings in Westchester County, New York
