= Memorials to Thomas Paine =

English-born American political activist, philosopher, political theorist, and revolutionary Thomas Paine has had the following memorials created and named in his honor.

== Memorials and tributes ==
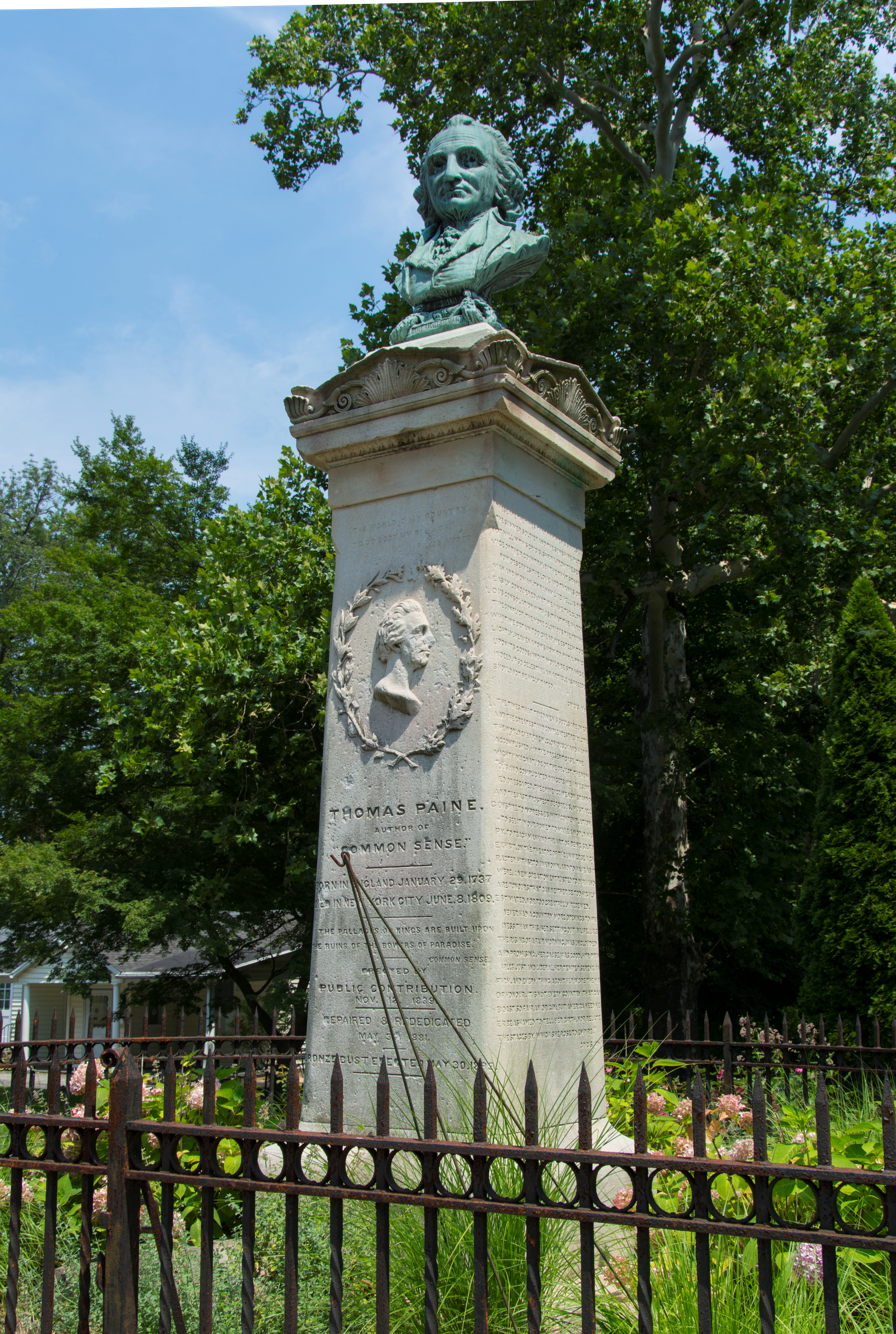
The Thomas Paine Monument

The first and longest-standing memorial to Paine is the carved and inscribed 12-foot marble column in New Rochelle, New York, organized and funded by publisher, educator and reformer Gilbert Vale (1791–1866) and raised in 1839 by the American sculptor and architect John Frazee, the Thomas Paine Monument.

New Rochelle is also the original site of Thomas Paine's Cottage, which along with a 320-acre (130 ha) farm were presented to Paine in 1784 by act of the New York State Legislature for his services in the American Revolution.

The same site was formerly the home of the Thomas Paine Memorial Museum. Thomas Edison helped to turn the first shovel of earth for the museum which served as a museum to display both Paine relics as well as others of local historical interest. A collection of books, pamphlets, and pictures was contained in the Paine library, including editions of Paine's works. The holdings, the subject of a sell-off controversy, were temporarily relocated to the New-York Historical Society and have since been more permanently archived in the Iona University library nearby.

Paine was originally buried near the current location of his house and monument upon his death in 1809. The site is marked by a small headstone and burial plaque even though his remains were removed years later.

In the 20th century, Joseph Lewis, longtime president of the Freethinkers of America and an ardent Paine admirer, was instrumental in having larger-than-life-sized statues of Paine erected in each of the three countries with which the revolutionary writer was associated. The first, created by Mount Rushmore sculptor Gutzon Borglum, was erected in Paris just before World War II began but not formally dedicated until 1948. It depicts Paine standing before the French National Convention to plead for the life of King Louis XVI. The second, sculpted in 1950 by Georg J. Lober, was erected near Paine's one time home in Morristown, New Jersey. It shows a seated Paine using a drum-head as a makeshift table. The third, sculpted by Sir Charles Wheeler, President of the Royal Academy, was erected in 1964 in Paine's birthplace, Thetford, England. With a quill pen in his right hand and an inverted copy of The Rights of Man in his left, it occupies a prominent spot on King Street. Thomas Paine was ranked No. 34 in the 100 Greatest Britons 2002 extensive Nationwide poll conducted by the BBC.

A bronze plaque attached to the wall of Thetford's Thomas Paine Hotel gives details of Paine's life. It was placed there in 1943 by voluntary contributions from U.S. airmen from a nearby bomber base. Texas folklorist and freethinker J. Frank Dobie, then teaching at Cambridge University, participated in the dedication ceremonies.

In New York City, the Thomas Paine Park is marked by a fountain called The Triumph of the Human Spirit. Located in downtown Manhattan, near City Hall, the 300-ton-plus monument was dedicated on October 12, 2000.

Bronx Community College includes Paine in its Hall of Fame of Great Americans and there are statues of Paine in Morristown and Bordentown, New Jersey and in the Parc Montsouris, in Paris.

In Paris, there is a plaque in the street where he lived from 1797 to 1802 that says: "Thomas PAINE / 1737–1809 / Englishman by birth / American by adoption / French by decree".

Yearly, between July 4 and 14, the Lewes Town Council in the United Kingdom celebrates the life and work of Paine.

In the early 1990s, largely through the efforts of citizen activist David Henley of Virginia, legislation (S.Con.Res 110 and H.R. 1628) was introduced in the 102nd Congress by ideological opposites Sen. Steve Symms (R-ID) and Rep. Nita Lowey (D-NY). With over 100 formal letters of endorsement by United States and foreign historians, philosophers and organizations, including the Thomas Paine National Historical Society, the legislation garnered 78 original co-sponsors in the Senate and 230 original co-sponsors in the House of Representatives, and was consequently passed by both houses' unanimous consent. In October 1992, the legislation was signed into law (PL102-407 and PL102-459) by President George H. W. Bush authorizing the construction by using private funds of a memorial to Thomas Paine in "Area 1" of the grounds of the U.S. Capitol. As of January 2011, the memorial has not yet been built.

The University of East Anglia's Norwich Business School is housed in the Thomas Paine Study Centre on its Norwich campus in Paine's home county of Norfolk.

The Cookes House is reputed to have been his home during the Second Continental Congress at York, Pennsylvania.

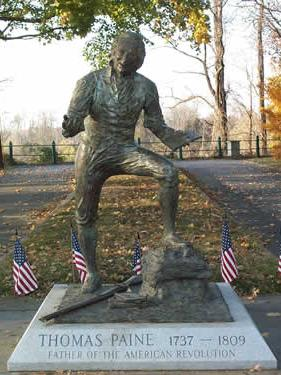
Statue in Bordentown, New Jersey

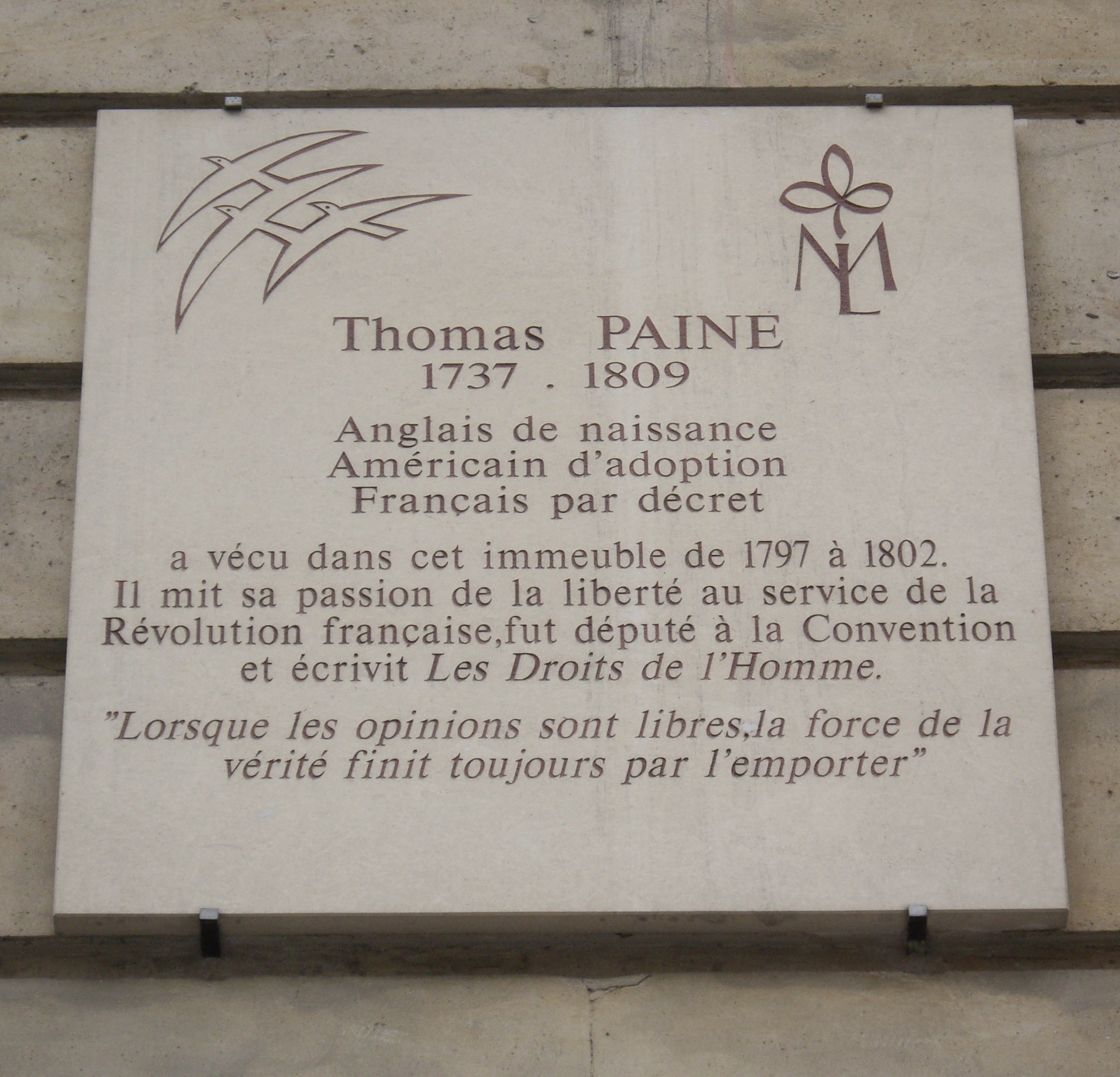
Plaque honoring Paine at 10 rue de l'Odéon, Paris

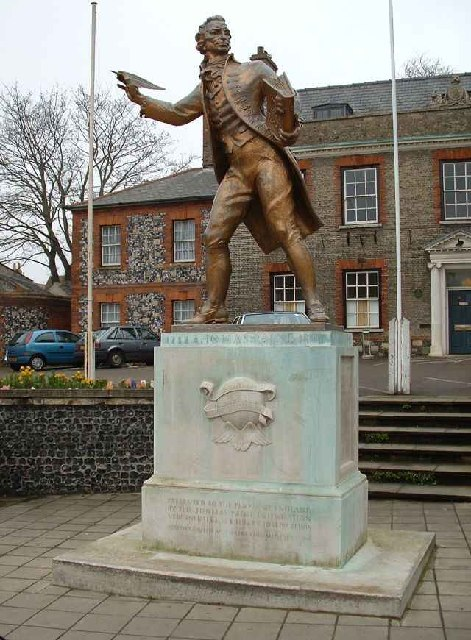
Statue in Thetford, Norfolk, England, Paine's birthplace

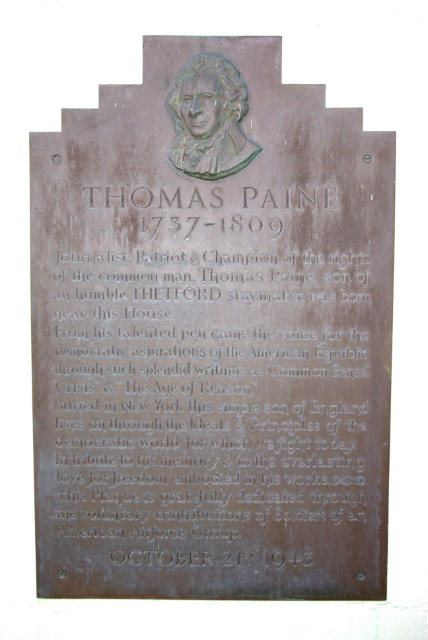
Plaque on the Thomas Paine Hotel, Thetford

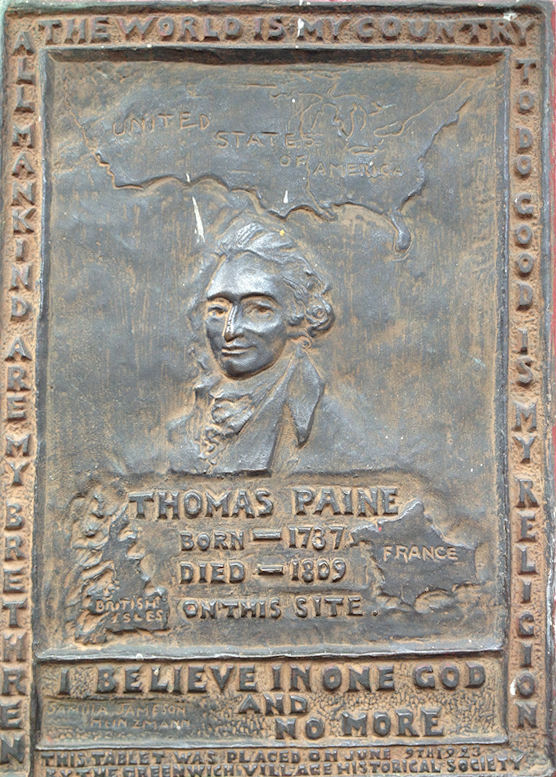
Commemorative plaque on the site of Paine's former residence in Greenwich Village, New York City
