= ITPS =

ITPS may refer to:

- International Test Pilots School
- Institute of Thomas Paine Studies
- Ib Thermal Power Station
- Intergovernmental Technical Panel on Soils, for soil governance
- Institute of Technical and Professional Studies, at the Dedan Kimathi University of Technology

== See also ==
- ITP (disambiguation)
