= Institute of Thomas Paine Studies =

The Institute for Thomas Paine Studies, or ITPS, is an academic center dedicated to the preservation, study and dissemination of the life, work and legacy of Thomas Paine, and is located on the campus of Iona University in the city of New Rochelle in Westchester County, New York. Thomas Paine was one of the founding fathers of the United States and the key political philosopher of the age of democratic revolutions. He was a resident of New Rochelle and lived on a farm just a short distance up North Avenue from the Iona University campus.

Established in 2013, the ITPS houses one of the world's unique Paine collections, including multiple first editions and early copies of his famous writings Common Sense, Age of Reason, and Rights of Man. It also contains more than 100 texts, pamphlets, and letters written or published by Paine himself, as well as personal items.

== Background ==
The Thomas Paine National Historical Association was established in New Rochelle in 1884. The contents of the Paine archive were assembled over a century by the association and kept in a safe within the Associations headquarters at the Thomas Paine Museum. The responsibility for caring for the collection was too much for the organization however, which never had enough money to properly care for and protect the items it had amassed.

In the early 2000s, the group moved much of its collection to the New York Historical Society in Manhattan. Several years later, in an attempt to raise money, the group sold some of its artifacts.

In 2009, the association began collaborating with Iona, forming a partnership to permanently preserve its archive. Years of legal work ensued and in 2013 the state Supreme Court approved a petition transferring custody of the collection from the TPNHA to the college. The collection, now housed in Iona's Ryan Library, features personal effects of Paine that have survived the ages, a vast array of historical documents surrounding Paine, and a broad representation of his writings.

== See also ==
- Thomas Paine National Historical Association
