= The First Lady of Jazz (sculpture) =

Statue in Yonkers, New York, U.S.

- Year: 1996
- Medium: Bronze
- Subject: Ella Fitzgerald
- Location: Yonkers, New York, U.S.; 40°56′6.7″N 73°54′9.2″W

The First Lady of Jazz is a statue of Ella Fitzgerald situated outside the Yonkers Metro-North station in the city of Yonkers in Westchester County, New York, United States. It was unveiled in October 1996; Fitzgerald had died in June 1996 at the age of 79.

The statue is cast in bronze and stands on a two tier granite pedestal. It is 5 feet 10 in height. The statue is life size and depicts Fitzgerald singing with open arms and "snapping fingers" wearing a dress and heels. It is situated on Trolley Barn Plaza at the corner of Buena Vista Avenue and Main Street in Yonkers.

It was sculpted by Vinnie Bagwell. It was Bagwell's first commissioned piece of public art, and became her ninth completed sculpture. The work was commissioned by the Bureau of Community Development and the Office of Downtown and Waterfront Development of Yonkers and was funded by a Federal grant of $25,000.

Fitzgerald grew up in Yonkers and attended Public School 18 and Benjamin Franklin Junior High School. Her family lived on School Street and Park Hill Avenue.

The statue is part of Westchester County's African-American Heritage Trail.
