= Rye African-American Cemetery =

Historic cemetery in Westchester County, New York

- African Cemetery
- U.S. National Register of Historic Places
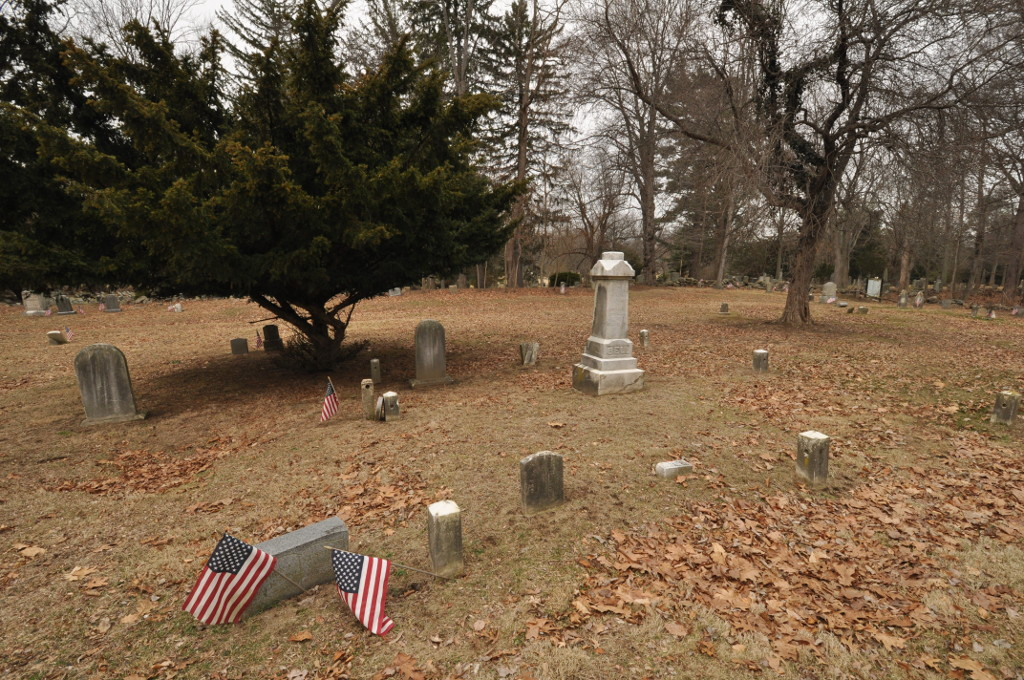
- Bell family plot

- Location within New York Location within the United States
- Location: North St., Rye, New York
- Coordinates: 40°58′34″N 73°42′12″W
- Area: 1.4 acres (0.57 ha)
- Built: 1860
- NRHP reference No.: 03000999
- Added to NRHP: October 03, 2003

The Rye African-American Cemetery, also known as the African Cemetery in Rye, is a historic 1.4 acre cemetery on North Street in Rye, New York. It was established as a burying ground for local African-Americans in 1860 through a donation of land by the Underhill family with the intent that it “shall forever hereafter kept, held and used for the purpose of a cemetery or burial place for the colored inhabitants of the said Town of Rye, and its vicinity free and clear of any charge". At least 35 of the individuals buried there are American veterans including men who served with the 20th United States Colored Infantry Regiment. The last documented burial in the cemetery was in 1964.

The cemetery was added to the National Register of Historic Places in 2003. In 2004, it was added to the African American Heritage Trail of Westchester County, a group of 16 sites which include Stony Hill Cemetery, Villa Lewaro and the Jay Estate.

== Stewardship ==
The cemetery is cared for and being restored by the non-profit Friends of the Rye African-American Cemetery together with descendants of those buried there and the local NAACP chapter. The Friends have led the preservation effort since 2010 In 2021, over 40 stones were conserved in a joint effort between the Friends of the Rye African American Cemetery, World Monuments Fund, Jay Heritage Center and Woodlawn Conservancy. The preservation effort was launched to coincide with the new federal Juneteenth celebration.

The Rye African-American Cemetery is located next to the southwest portion of Greenwood Union Cemetery and is accessed through the front entrance of Greenwood Union. New signage for the burial ground to make it easier to locate and reinforce its identity as a separate entity was installed in 2021 as part of revitalization efforts.

== See also ==
- National Register of Historic Places listings in southern Westchester County, New York
