= Soil governance =

Governmental decision-making regarding the use of soil

Soil governance refers to the policies, strategies, and the processes of decision-making employed by nation states and local governments regarding the use of soil. Globally, governance of the soil has been limited to an agricultural perspective due to increased food insecurity from the most populated regions on earth. The Global Soil Partnership, GSP, was initiated by the Food and Agriculture Organization (FAO) and its members with the hope to improve governance of the limited soil resources of the planet in order to guarantee healthy and productive soils for a food-secure world, as well as support other essential ecosystem services.

Governing the soil requires international and national collaboration between governments, local authorities, industries and citizens to ensure implementation of coherent policies that encourage practices and methodologies that regulate usage of the resource to avoid conflict between users to promote sustainable land management. In the European Union's environmental policies, soil is recognized as a non-renewable resource, but its governance is maintained at a national level, unlike other non-renewable and climate sensitive resources. In the developing world, soil governance is biased towards promoting sustainable agriculture and ensuring food security.

Governance of the soil differs from soil management. Soil management involves practices and techniques used to increase and maintain soil fertility, structure, and carbon sequestration, etc. Soil management techniques are heavily utilized in agriculture, because of the need to regulate the various practices, such as tillage techniques, fertilizer application and crop rotation (among others) by the various stakeholders involved. The need to monitor and avoid the negative effects of agricultural land use such as soil erosion has formed the basis of the discourse and awareness on soil governance, and has also seen the emergence of science and technology as the link between soil management and governance. Soil governance mechanisms are usually encapsulated within the context of land governance, with little focus on urban and industrial soil governance especially in developing countries that have rapid urbanization rates; thus, soil governance is highly interlinked with other atmospheric and anthropogenic processes which may contribute to the difficulty in distinguishing it as an entity.

With an aim to make soil data available to all, the Food and Agriculture Organization and UNESCO created a global soil map in 1981 as the main information on the distribution of soil resources. Currently, under the GSP framework, a new global soil information system will be developed.

In 2002, the International Union of Soil Sciences proposed December 5 to be "World Soil Day" to celebrate the importance of soil in our lives. Under the framework of the GSP, the sixty-eighth session of the United Nations General Assembly in December 2013 designated December 5 as the World Soil Day and declared 2015 as the International Year of Soils with the aim to raise awareness on the importance of soils for ecosystem functions and food security .

== Global Soil Partnership ==
Changes in land use, population growth, and the impacts of climate change have led to a gradual process of soil degradation. Soil degradation is a gradual process involving the natural and anthropogenic processes that result in the physical loss (erosion) and reduction in soil quality. The recognition of anthropogenic effects on soil degradation has influenced discourse of urban soil management, and formulation of policies by regional organizations. However, soil remains as the primary medium for food production, thus global soil governance is directed towards the impacts of soil degradation on food production and conflicts that arise between the need for human settlements and space available for food production. The impacts of climate change also contribute to the conflict because carbon dioxide emissions have progressively led to higher average global temperatures, which has led to an increase in soil degradation through erosion, increased salinity, and a reduction in the flora and fauna that contribute to its quality.

The Global Soil Partnership (GSP) was established in December 2012 as a mechanism to develop a strong interactive partnership and enhanced collaboration and synergy of efforts between all stakeholders. The GSP's ultimate goal is to achieve food security and restoration of ecosystem services through conserving, enhancing, and restoring soil resources through productive and sustainable use. The partnership is an open, interactive, responsive and voluntary partnership which includes FAO Member countries and GSP partners—governmental organizations, universities, civil institutions, research centers, soil science societies, UN agencies, NGOs, private companies, farmer associations, and donors. In addition to being a global partnership, the GSP works with Regional Soil Partnerships (RSPs) to provide guidance on goals and priorities within specific regions and develop relevant activities within each region.

Every year, the GSP meets in Plenary Assembly form to meet the different demands from each region. The First Plenary Assembly, held in June 2013 at the FAO's headquarters adopted the Rules of Procedure, nominated and established an Intergovernmental Technical Panel of Soils (ITPS), started thinking about the five pillars of action, supported the implementation of Regional Soil Partnerships and developed a GSP roadmap. The Second Plenary Assembly will be held in July 2014.

=== Intergovernmental Technical Panel on Soils (ITPS) ===
The Intergovernmental Technical Panel on Soils, established in 2003, represents all regions of the world and is composed of 27 soil expert representatives. The ITPS is here to advise the GSP on scientific and technical knowledge, advocate for the inclusion of sustainable soil management in different agendas, review the GSP's Plan of Action, follow up on the Plan of Action and request the formation of committees for exceptional cases.

== International Year of Soils ==
Logo of International Year of Soils 2015

The International Year of Soils, 2015 (IYS 2015) was declared by the Sixty-eighth session of the United Nations General Assembly on December 20, 2013, after recognizing December 5 as World Soil Day.

Food and Agriculture Organization of the United Nations has been nominated to implement the IYS 2015, within the framework of the Global Soil Partnership and in collaboration with Governments and the secretariat of the United Nations Convention to Combat Desertification.

The aim of the IYS is to increase awareness and understanding of the importance of soil for food security and essential ecosystem functions.

== By region ==
=== European Union ===
The United Nations Earth Summit Conference on Environment and Development catalysed the formation of EU environmental policy into a policy that was centred on the environmental consequences of integration. The conference organized by the United Nations saw the acceptance of various documents and charters governing the natural environment and sustainable development. In its inception phase, EU environmental policy was a reaction to normalise competition with the markets. Having a common policy would ensure that member states were bound to directives that would regulate their production methods thus affect production output and competitive advantage. Focus was directed on air pollution from industries, and other forms of tangible, measurable, and traceable pollution that could be isolated to an event or a process, such as acidification Swedish lakes in the 1970s and 1980s caused by high sulphur dioxide emissions from power plants. Such forms of pollution were often governed with bans, quotas and economic instruments such as taxes and fines. With improvements in technology, access and delivery of information and changes in global conceptualisation of the environment, EU environmental policy has evolved to become more responsive and bespoke, and has also increased its scope to various sources and sinks of pollution.

In 2006, the European Commission tabled a proposal to the European Parliament to establish a framework for soil protection within the union. Soil is recognised as a non-renewable resource because of its slow formation process. However—unlike other non-renewable resources, such as coal, that have explicit policies governing extraction methods, trading, and consumption in the EU—soil governance is contained within the contexts of environmental policies and regulation on various entities of the biosphere. The draft policy recognised that soil governance had been "scattered" in EU legislation, and lacked a cohesive isolated framework, therefore governance and management of the same resource was open to interpretation depending on the main resource and industry policy in question. The policy sought to unify the "scattered" regulations because they lacked the mandate to "identify and cover all soil threats". This view was supported by extensive consultation between stakeholders and the European commission that started in February 2003, and saw member states convey their support for a framework based on regional action in 2004. The framework was developed as a directive to member states; this form of legislation allows interpretation by stakeholders at national and local levels, and between networks thus complying with the subsidiarity principle. The principle provides that EU political decisions must be implemented at "the lowest possible administrative and political level, and as close to the citizens as possible", unless in areas where action by individual countries is insufficient. It is under this principle that member states rejected the proposal to establish a framework for soil protection as the proposal argued that member states are unable to effectively monitor and manage their soils. Inconsistencies in national soil governance strategies and, classification and treatment of contaminants would disable the objectives of the proposal because of the complexities of trans-border soil pollution and management. Furthermore, soil degradation and mismanagement affects other environmental areas, and industries governed through EU legislation such as water, biodiversity, and food production, thus it was deemed appropriate to have uniform legislation across all entities. Member states argued that soil management should not be negotiated at the European Regional level as they already had strong domestic policies regulating soil usage and management, therefore focus should be directed at strengthening local policies and regulatory institution. Consequently, the EU does not have a cohesive soil governance policy and relies on environmental policies, and non-renewable resource policies and legislations of member states to guide utilisation, management and regulate pollutants of the soil.

The concept of healthy soils is part of the European Green Deal to achieve climate neutrality, zero pollution, a sustainable food system and a resilient environment. Given the European Union's objective to become the first climate neutral continent by 2050, the European Commission adopted a series of communications for a greener Europe. In 2020, the EU presented measures within the Biodiversity 2030, Farm to Fork and Chemicals Strategies, as well as the Circular Economy Action Plan and the European Climate Law, which included actions to protect soils.

The EU Soil Strategy for 2030, launched in 2021, lays out the plan to achieve healthy soils for food security and climate change mitigation. It also serves as the framework for the Soil Monitoring Law which was initially planned to touch on various aspects of soil health and be legally binding for Member States, but the final law contained no obligatory targets and concerned only monitoring.

=== India ===
In terms of employment, the agricultural sector is one of the main sectors in the Indian economy. In 2010, the sector employed 58.2% of the nations workforce, and contributed 15.7% to the nations GDP. Cognisant of agriculture's role in the economy, the 11th five-year economic plan that runs from 2007 to 2012 recognises the importance of proper soil management in agriculture. Soil degradation through excessive and miscalculated fertiliser use because of emphasis on increased output has led to nearly two-thirds of India's farmlands to be classified as either degraded or sick. In attempts to increase knowledge on soils and soil management, the government of Gujarat initiated the Soil Health Cards Programme in 2006 that was "expected to bridge the gap between Scientists, agricultural extension workers, farmers and input-output dealers". The programme relies on technology to disseminate accountable and uncomplicated scientific information that is based on the farmers needs. Farmers take samples of their soil for analysis in a state run laboratory. Based on the sample, farmers get information on the soil mineral and water content, fertiliser application methods, and advice on what crops to grow.

In the pilot scheme, collected data was inputted into a web-based information system that included the Internet, intranet and GSWAN (Gujarat State Wide Area Network) to build up the state, and national database on soil health. Increasing knowledge on soil management, increased output, and reduced costs for farmers and contributed to Gujarat's agriculture growth rate that was three times the national growth rate in 2009. The success of the scheme has facilitated its implementation at a national level under the Ministry of Agriculture. Each state and union territory is responsible for the set-up and management of the soil testing facilities and maintaining the state soil database so that it is uniform and standardised. The testing, advisory and issuance processes involved are at multi-governance levels involving stakeholders from the private and public sectors. Government approved NGOs, community associations' farmers, the state administration and national administration are all involved in the scheme at different levels. The process begins with the farmers assisted by various NGOs and community groups and involves interactions with more NGOs and state officers at higher levels, as they are responsible for soil sample testing. The impacts of increased global temperatures have had negative effects towards effective soil management techniques in the developing world. Changes in precipitation patterns and an increase in extreme events such as floods and drought have exacerbated issues such as desertification and soil erosion. The effects of such events are further aggravated by resource-deficient farmers and government officials who lack skills to prepare and manage their soils for disasters, and end up relying on relief aid for sustenance. Addressing the Impacts of desertification is a complex multi-level process because of the social, environmental and economic factors.

The Republic of India ratified the United Nations Convention to Combat Desertification in 1984, and has since instituted the National Programme to Combat Desertification that utilises an integrated and holistic approach at governing the soil. Through various ministries the national programme aspires to implement the UNCCD by increasing capacity in soil and soil water management, improving access to micro-credit with a focus on women and marginalised groups, promoting alternative energy supplies to reduce reliance on wood increasing soil monitoring and strengthening legislation regarding land management in industrial and mining activities.

== Impacts of industrialization and urbanization ==
In the developing world, industrialization and urbanization are emerging as significant contributors to land and soil degradation. Lack of sufficient knowledge in soil management and disregard for the environment has been identified as key reasons affecting urban soil degradation. Industrialization alters the chemical aspects of the soil through pollution of heavy metals and effluents. Construction and landfills in urban areas affect soil through compaction and excavation, which affect natural processes such as water purification and storage. In the developing and developing world governance of soils in urban areas requires bespoke policies because of the nature of urban and industrial developments in the cities. In Central Europe, governance of urban soils is facilitated by the urban soil management strategy that aims to design applicable soil management strategies in select European cities. Through networks created with universities and municipal authorities the project aims to research into and develop an interdisciplinary approach to manage urban soils,. In the developing world, urban and industrial soil governance is linked to sustainable development of cities to address urban poverty and responsible land use through effective waste management. Often, developing countries lack resources to implement policies governing settlements and industries, thus the soil and water are often heavily polluted. Urban soil management uses an interdisciplinary approach to protect biodiversity reliant upon the soil and land, reduce pollution from industrial effluents, and increase resilience of the soil to stresses such as compaction from construction.

== Role of science and technology ==
The global soil map is a global consortium between academic, regional and national scientific institutions coordinated by stakeholders according to the respective regions. Using Geographic Information Systems (GIS), Remote sensing and emerging technologies a global soil map will be created to represent different soil types. The consortium is led by the ISRIC-World Soil Information, whose mandate to increase knowledge on soils through data collection and dissemination and development of technologies and methodologies for digital soil mapping. GIS is used to display, analyse and collate soil data and processes, and also identify different types of soils through mapping and web-based software. Soil Science is used in tandem with GIS to identify individual soil properties applicable to agricultural and urban soil management. The Soil Health Card Programme in India utilises soil science to advise farmers on fertiliser usage and crop rotations and records the data on a national network which can be used to map different soil types across the country.

== See also ==
=== United States ===
- Soil Conservation and Domestic Allotment Act of 1936
