= Stony Hill Cemetery =

Historic cemetery in Westchester County, New York, US

- U.S. National Register of Historic Places
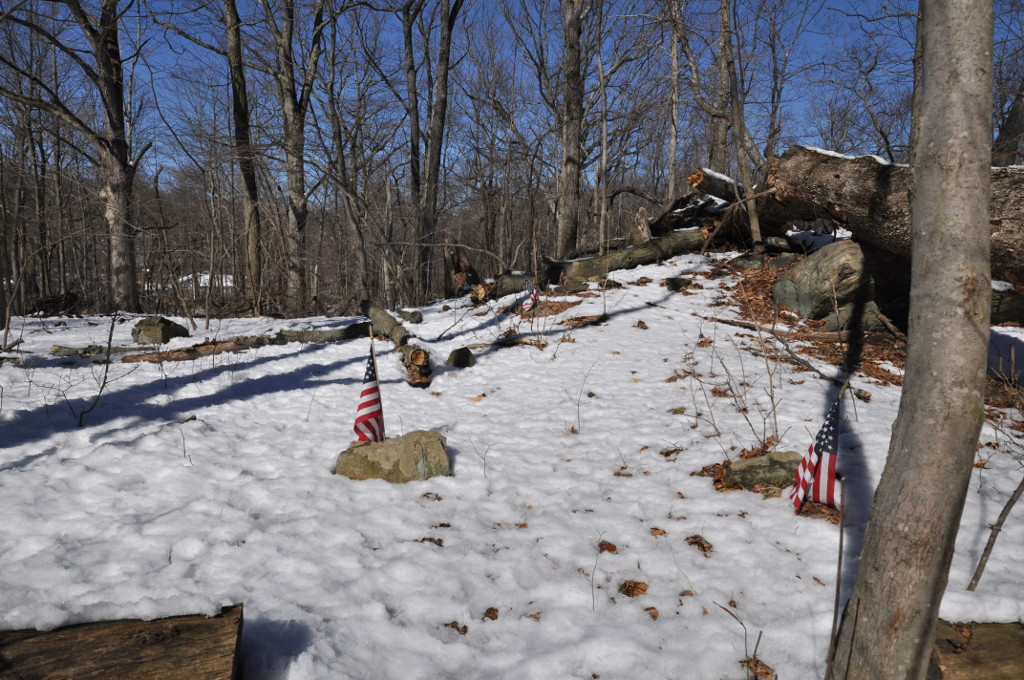

- Location within New York Location within the United States
- Location: Buckout Rd., Harrison, New York
- Coordinates: 41°3′18″N 73°44′59″W
- Area: 6.5 acres (2.6 ha)
- Built: 1800
- NRHP reference No.: 99000753
- Added to NRHP: June 25, 1999

Stony Hill Cemetery, also known as the Cemetery of the Asbury Colored Peoples Church, is a historic cemetery located at Harrison, Westchester County, New York. It is an example of a rural, 19th century African American burial ground.

== History ==
The cemetery contains approximately 200 grave sites. It includes seven professionally carved stones, including four government issued markers. Also on the property is the site of a former church demolished before 1930.

It was added to the National Register of Historic Places in 1999. In 2004, it was added to the African American Heritage Trail of Westchester County, a group of 14 sites which include the Rye African-American Cemetery, Villa Lewaro and the Jay Estate.

Records show that 36 buried individuals are veterans: 16 were with the 29th Connecticut Colored Infantry Regiment; 14 were with the 11th United States Colored Heavy Artillery Regiment; five men served in the 20th United States Colored Infantry Regiment; and one man was in the Navy.

== See also ==
- National Register of Historic Places listings in southern Westchester County, New York
