= African American Heritage Trail of Westchester County =

Heritage trail in New York state, United States

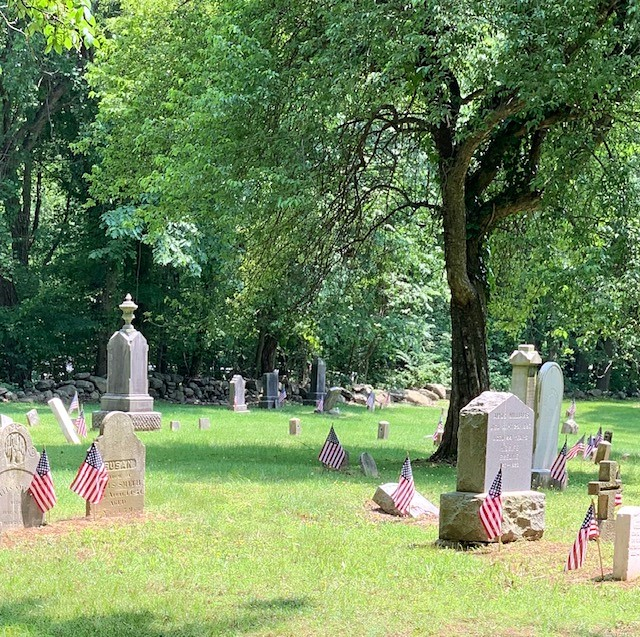
- African American Cemetery in Rye, one of stops on the Trail
- Location: Westchester County, New York, US
- Created: 2004-present
- Governing body: African American Advisory Board of Westchester County
- Website: www.visitwestchesterny.com/things-to-do/history/african-american-history/

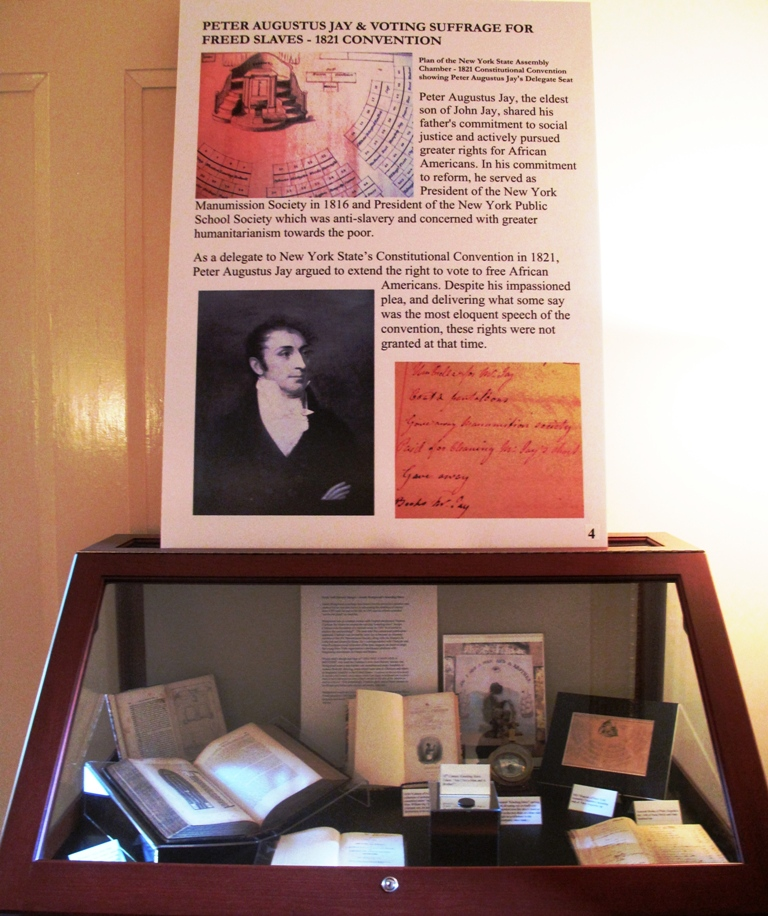
Manumission exhibit at Jay Heritage Center

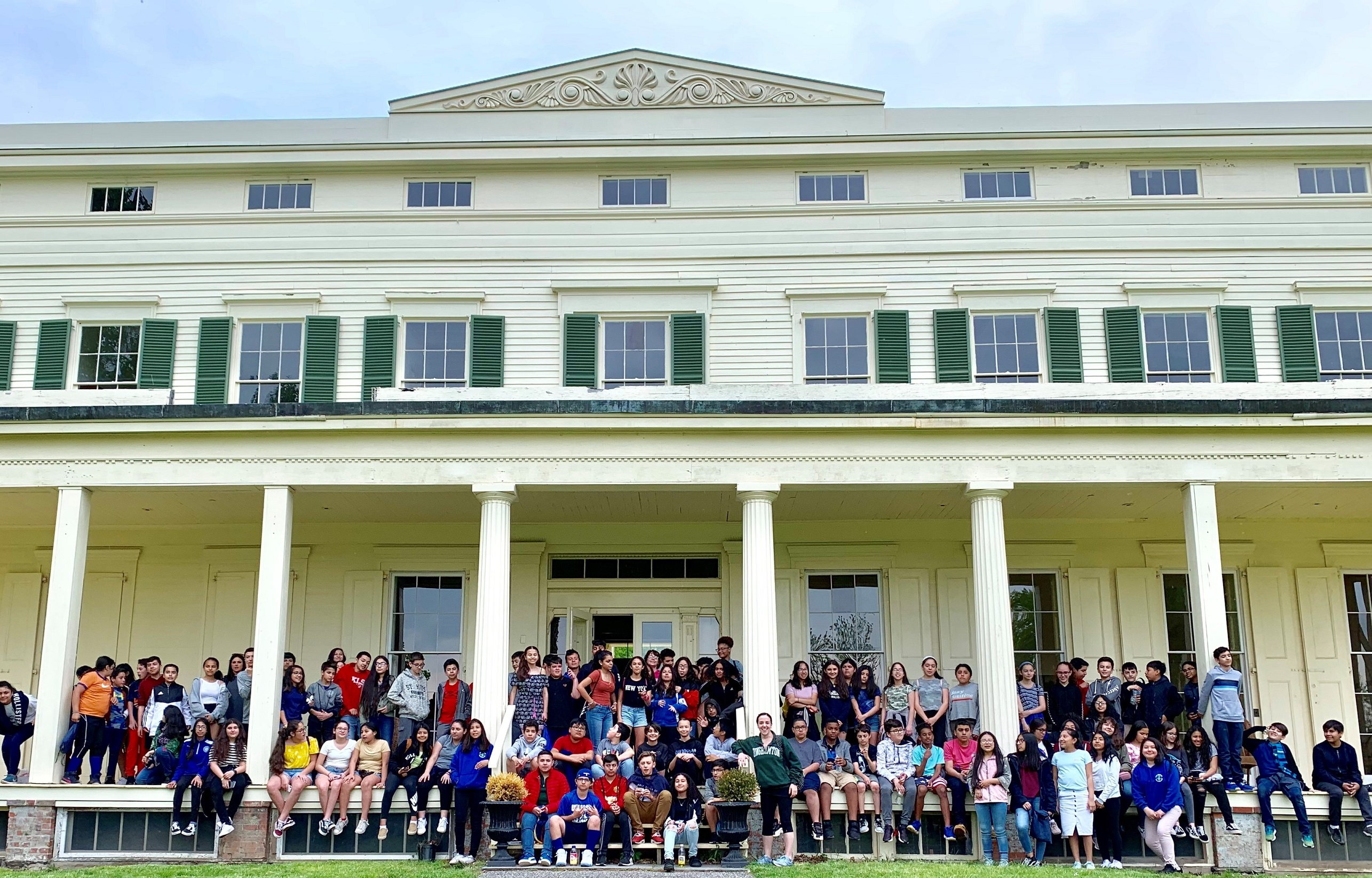
School group at Jay Estate learns about the abolition of slavery in New York State

The African American Heritage Trail of Westchester County in New York was created in 2004 to help preserve and interpret the historic landmark places that help tell the narratives of women and men of African descent who have made significant contributions to an American identity. The initial list had 13 sites. Westchester County historian and Schulman History Honoree Dr. Larry Spruill was lead consultant and researcher for the project.

== History ==
As early as 1984, leaders of Westchester's African American community under the guidance of historian John Henry Harmon, Jr. began building awareness about important heritage sites in the county. A more formalized trail was later created under the auspices of the African American Advisory Board of Westchester County (AAAB). Associated AAAB events like the annual Trailblazer Awards each February and other programs and exhibits are regularly hosted at several of the sites.

== Sites ==
The trail includes the following heritage destination sites:

1. Saint Paul's Church National Historic Site – 897 South Columbus Avenue, Mount Vernon; this landmark, managed by the National Park Service, is the site of thousands of burials of African American men and women. Programs conducted here reflect the contributions of enslaved and free families to the surrounding community along Eastchester Creek. Church records include notations which are helpful for genealogical research purposes.
2. Jay Estate – 210 Boston Post Road, Rye; the ancestral home of John Jay and the Jay family was also the residence of enslaved and freed men and women of African descent. Programs and school tours focus on the abolition of slavery in New York and Civil Rights as well as John Jay's anti-slavery efforts including work with the NY Manumission Society and passage of Gradual Emancipation Act of New York while Governor. Educational programs and exhibits interpret the lives of enslaved men and women who lived and worked at "The Locusts" including Caesar Valentine, Mary and Clarinda; several are buried in unmarked graves on the original property. The 23-acre park is operated by the non-profit Jay Heritage Center.
3. John Jay Homestead – Katonah; this is the retirement home of John Jay. The site is owned by New York State Parks.
4. The Rye African-American Cemetery – 215 North Street, Rye; there are at least 300 known burials at this 1860 National Historic Register including African American veterans of the Civil War. It is maintained by the non-profit Friends of the Rye African American Cemetery. Associated programs and a large 3 paneled kiosk trace the lives of free 19th and 20th century individuals of African descent who lived and worked in the Town of Rye, Mamaroneck and Scarsdale including Charles and Harriett Seely Purdy, the Brown Family, the Petersen family and their descendants. The site hosts annual observations at Memorial Day and Veterans Day. It was added to the National Historic Register in 1986.
5. Foster Memorial AME Zion Church – Tarrytown; this church was a refuge for fugitive slaves.
6. Stony Hill Cemetery – Buckout Road, Harrison; this 18th century burial ground is noted for over 200 burials of free black residents from an area called "The Hills" of Harrison including a dozen African American veterans of the Civil War. The land was originally donated by the Quaker Church to enslaved people who had been freed. The property is associated with Mount Hope African American Zion Church.
7. Philipsburg Manor House – Sleepy Hollow; at least 23 men, women, and children are known to have been enslaved at the manor by the Philipse family. The site hosts programs that illustrates the humanity of these individuals who were treated like property.
8. Philipse Manor Hall State Historic Site – Yonkers; the site was one of the two manor houses of the Philipse family, Westchester County's largest slave traders and slaveholders.
9. Monument to 1st Rhode Island Regiment – 2880 Crompound Road, Yorktown Heights; this monument is dedicated to soldiers of the 1st Rhode Island Regiment who died in the Battle of Pine's Bridge during the Revolutionary War; many were African Americans. This stone was erected in 1982 thanks to the civic advocacy of historian John H. Harmon. It is located in the cemetery of the First Presbyterian Church of Yorktown Heights. In 2018, the Pines Bridge Battle Monument was dedicated in the center of Yorktown Heights, depicting the commanding officer of the regiment and two of the soldiers of his integrated unit—an African American and a Native American.
10. Ella Fitzgerald Statue (The First Lady of Jazz) – 5 Buena Vista Avenue, Yonkers; Ella Fitzgerald, a renowned jazz singer, grew up in Westchester. This statue commemorating her contributions to American music was created by African American artist Vinnie Bagwell.
11. Chappaqua Friends Meeting House – 420 Quaker Road, Chappaqua; it was a stop on the Underground Railroad and a birthplace of the abolitionist movement in New York.
12. Jack Peterson Memorial – Croton-on-Hudson, Croton Point Park; named for Revolutionary War patriot John Jacob "Rifle Jack" Peterson; the act of heroism of Peterson and his fellow soldier was declared a pivotal moment that led to the capture of Major Andre.
13. Villa Lewaro – Irvington; historic residence of African American businesswoman and cosmetics pioneer Madame C. J. Walker; privately owned, not open to the public. Historian Brent Leggs helped research possible preservation opportunities for the property.
14. Neuberger Museum of Art - Purchase; the museum has a large collection of African diaspora art.
15. Enslaved Africans' Raingarden - Yonkers; located on the Yonkers waterfront, the Raingarden consists of five sculptures depicting individuals who were some of the first enslaved people to be freed from slavery by the law prior to the issuance of the Emancipation Proclamation.
16. Rising Sun Golf & Country Club - Hudson Hills Golf Course, Croton Dam Road, Ossining; since 2025, a plaque on the Hudson Hills Golf Course commemorates its pre-WWII history as the Rising Sun Golf & Country Club, the first black-owned and operated golf course in the Tri-State area.
17. Saint Frances AME Zion Church - Port Chester; it is the oldest Black church and one of the oldest of all denominations in Port Chester. For years, it was the only church serving people of color in the area, including the communities of Mamaroneck and New Rochelle.
18. Captain's Cottage, Home of Captain Lewis Brady - Sparta, Ossining; born into slavery at George Washington's Mount Vernon plantation, Brady escaped to freedom, eventually settling in Ossining in 1836. He became a successful entrepreneur in the clam and oyster business, earning the title "Captain." Captain Brady lived to the age of 108, making him the oldest person buried in the historic Sparta Cemetery.
19. Lee’s Funeral Home - White Plains; it was established in 1915 to provide funerary services to the local African-American community during the Jim Crow era, filling a critical void left by white-owned funeral homes that refused to serve them.
20. Lincoln Park - New Rochelle; added to the Trail to preserve and honor the history of the neighborhood surrounding Lincoln Avenue, historically known as the "Harlem of Westchester" and the Lincoln Avenue Corridor. A vibrant, predominantly African American community thrived there from the early 1900s Great Migration through the 1960s, when it was significantly disrupted due to urban renewal and highway construction.
