= Thomas Paine National Historical Association =

Historical society dedicated to American patriot Thomas Paine

Coordinates: 40.935318°N 73.791625°W

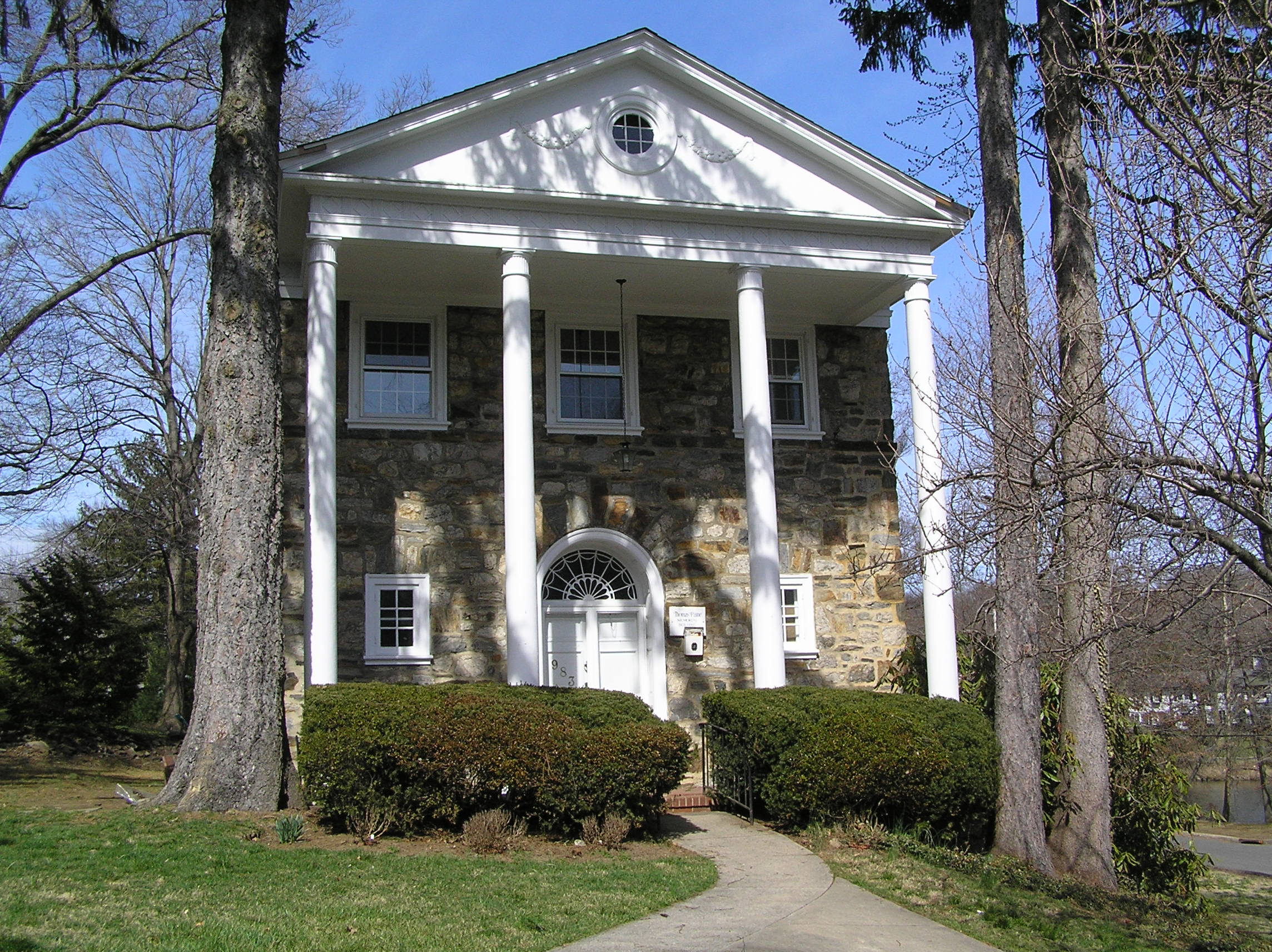
Thomas Paine Memorial Building

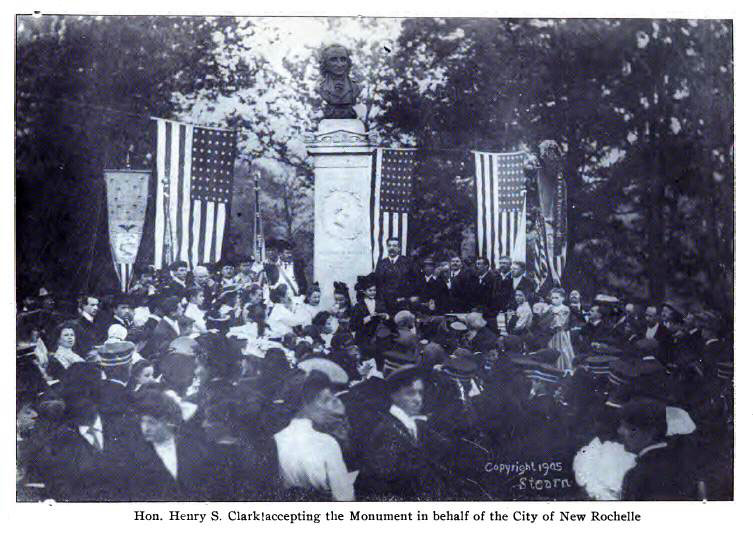
Rededication of the Paine Monument, October 14, 1905

The Thomas Paine Historical Association is an organization based in New Rochelle, New York, that is dedicated to perpetuating the legacy of Founding Father Thomas Paine. It was organized on January 29, 1884, the anniversary of Paine's birthday, and is one of the oldest historical associations in the United States. It is one of two Thomas Paine legacy organizations based in New Rochelle, the other being the Thomas Paine Cottage Museum of the Huguenot and New Rochelle Historical Society, founded in 1886, which owns and maintains the Thomas Paine Cottage. In 2025, the US-based Thomas Paine National Historical Association and the UK-based Thomas Paine Society merged to form Thomas Paine Historical Association.

== History ==
The Association's first elected president was writer, abolitionist, and confidant to Abraham Lincoln, Dr. Moncure D. Conway. Conway is credited with writing the first comprehensive biography of Paine in 1892. On October 14, 1905, the Association held an elaborate ceremony to rededicate the Thomas Paine Monument. Previously, on Memorial Day 1899, the Association had held a big meeting in connection with the erection of the bronze bust of Paine which now sits on a marble base. It was in 1905 that the monument was moved and placed in its present location in the center of Paine Avenue. The ceremonies included speeches, a parade and a salute of thirteen guns by second battery, U. S. Army, in honor of the thirteen original states. In 1906 the Association was reorganized, and incorporated under the laws of New York and is now known as the Thomas Paine National Historical Association.

== Thomas Paine Memorial Building ==
The Paine Memorial Building is located north of the Paine Monument at the corner of North Avenue and Valley Road in New Rochelle, New York. The construction of this building was begun on May 30, 1925, under the instruction of President William van der Weyde. Thomas A. Edison helped to turn the first shovel of earth for the museum. The building once served as a museum that displayed both Paine relics as well as others of local historical interest. The collection is now housed at Iona College, New Rochelle, NY. In 1943 a wing was added to the building to house the Hufeland Memorial Library. This collection comprised several thousand items pertaining to the history of Westchester and were assembled by Otto Hufeland of Mount Vernon, New York. The collection is currently on loan to the Westchester County Historical Society.

== See also ==
- Thomas Paine Cottage
- Thomas Paine Monument
- Institute of Thomas Paine Studies
