= Jack Peterson (American Patriot) =

Revolutionary War hero and related memorial

Defense of Teller's Point Memorial (Jack Peterson Memorial)
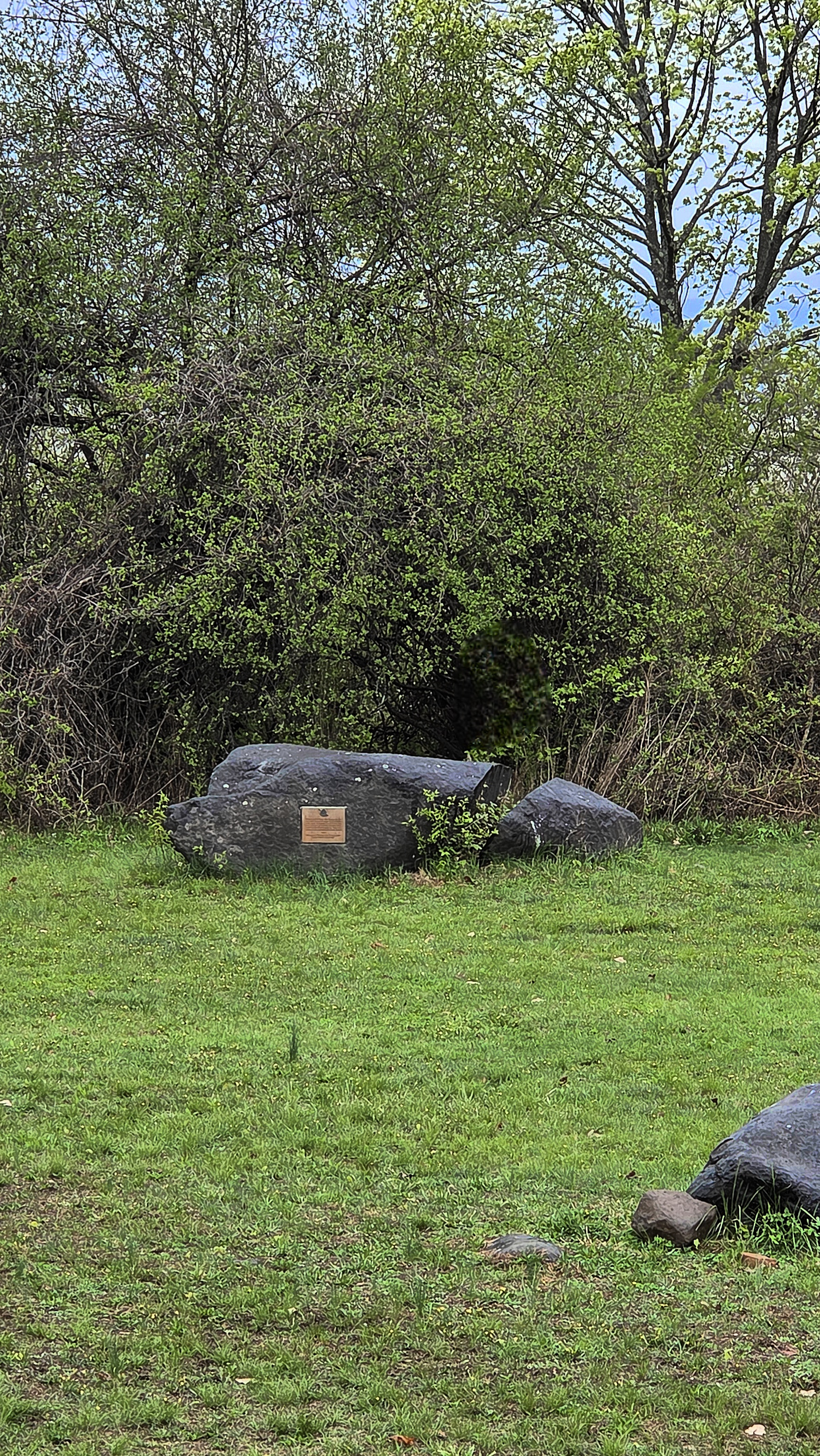
- Defense of Teller's Point Memorial (Jack Peterson Memorial)
- Interactive map of Defense of Teller's Point Memorial (Jack Peterson Memorial)
- Location: 1 Croton Point Park Avenue, Croton-on-Hudson, New York
- Coordinates: 41°11.038′N 73°54.051′W

John Jacob “Rifle Jack” Peterson (1746-1850), also known as John Patterson, was a Revolutionary War-era Patriot of African and Kitchewan descent whose quick thinking helped repel British forces at Teller's Point in what is now Croton Point Park (Croton-on-Hudson, New York). His actions threw Benedict Arnold’s treasonous plans into disarray and contributed to the capture of Major John André. This heroism inspired the erection of a memorial plaque at Teller's Point. The plaque also commemorates the actions of Moses Sherwood, but the marker has been more popularly known as the Jack Peterson Memorial.

== History ==
In 1780, Peterson was a 35-year-old veteran soldier, having already served in the 2nd New York Regiment and fought in major battles such as Saratoga (1777) and Monmouth (1778) before re-enlisting in the Westchester County Militia. On September 21, he was in the company of a white 19-year-old fellow private class soldier named Moses Sherwood. (The two shared a profound bond: Peterson had reportedly held Sherwood’s father in his arms as the latter died during the Battle of Saratoga three years earlier). That day, they were reportedly not on official guard duty but at a cider mill on Teller’s Point, crushing apples, when they spied the British HMS Vulture sending a rowboat of men towards land. A skilled marksman, Peterson fired on the rowboat, forcing its occupants to return to the ship. The two then sped to Fort Lafayette at Verplanck's Point to alert their commander about the vessel. Acting upon this information, troops set up a cannon or cannons at Teller's Point to attack the sloop in a fiery battle that lasted two hours. (A cannon presumably used in that engagement is currently mounted on a commemorative base in front of the Peekskill Museum, inscribed as "America’s Most Famous Cannon.") These actions contributed to the later capture of Major André, who would have been rescued by the British but was instead stranded on shore.

Peterson was given land in Cortlandt, where he raised a large family; he later moved to Peekskill. Despite his contributions to this pivotal chapter in American history, Peterson did not receive a veteran's pension until age 90 for his bravery. He died on October 2, 1850, "a revolutionary pensioner, in the 103d year of his age," and was buried at Bethel Cemetery in Croton-on-Hudson.

Sherwood also remained in the area after the war. He lived and died in Ossining and was buried on February 17, 1837, in the historic Sparta Cemetery. Remarkably, that cemetery itself bears scars from the same September 1780 event: one of its gravestones still shows damage from a British cannonball fired from HMS Vulture during the engagement at Teller's Point.

The story of the two soldiers' feat of valor was repeated many times and regarded as a vital part of winning the war. Even the log of the British sloop cited the event and “complained of a violation of the military rule in that a boat the day before had been decoyed and fired upon by armed men concealed in the bushes.”

== Defense of Teller's Point Memorial ==
The suggestion of a monument to commemorate both Peterson and Sherwood's attack on the British was raised as early as 1859. Noted Westchester historians Bolton and Scharf also credited the two men "for causing the departure of the Vulture and the change in André’s route to British headquarters in New York City, necessitating his attempt to deliver the plans of West Point by land through Westchester County which resulted in his capture at Tarrytown." In 1963, one writer said the two belonged "to the Valhalla of America's great."

A plaque was finally unveiled in 1967 by the Mohegan Chapter of the Daughters of the American Revolution (DAR). The inscription says "Commemorating the defense of Teller's Point by George Sherwood and Jack Peterson who repulsed the landing of British troops from the "Vulture" September 21, 1780, aiding in the capture of Major André." The monument is located in today's Croton Point Park.

In 2004, the site of Peterson's heroism was added to the African American Heritage Trail of Westchester County based on research conducted by Dr. Larry Spruill. According to then-Westchester County Executive Andrew Spano, a former history teacher, the selection of the site as one of the inaugural educational tour stops on the Trail was made with the input of the African-American Advisory Board.

== See also ==
- Black Patriot
