= Vinnie Bagwell =

American sculptor

- Born: December 7, 1957 (age 68); Yonkers, New York, U.S.
- Education: Morgan State University (B.A., Psychology, 1979)
- Occupations: Sculptor, writer, graphic designer
- Years active: 1993–present
- Known for: The First Lady of Jazz; The Enslaved Africans' Rain Garden; Victory Beyond Sims
- Awards: Jorge and Darlene Pérez Prize in Public Art & Civic Design (2020); ArtsWestchester Artist Award (2021); Trailblazers Award, African American Advisory Board of Westchester County (2017); Who's Who in America (2022–23)
- Website: vinniebagwell.com

Vinnie Bagwell is an American sculptor and representational figurative artist.

== Biography ==
Vinnie Bagwell was born and lives in Yonkers, New York, where she resided in the town of Greenburgh for most of her early life. She was always interested in art even from a young age and began painting in high school. Completely untutored, she began sculpting in 1993 and since then has gone on to earn many awards and commissions from communities around the United States. She would go on sculpting until 1996 when she received her first real commission from the city of Yonkers for her piece The First Lady of Jazz.

== Art ==
Bagwell is known for her many works of social and representational sculptures. These sculptures tend to be cast in bronze or bronze resin, which is her preferred material. Her works tend to reflect important African American figures and the struggles of enslaved people who were taken from their homes and their lives to become the property of someone else. Her goal as an artist is to help people be more aware of the struggles these people went through. She hopes that through her art, people will begin to fully comprehend everything that they sacrificed and had stolen away from them.

== Enslaved Africans' Raingarden ==
The Enslaved Africans' Raingarden on the Yonkers waterfront is one of Bagwell's biggest projects. It consists of five sculptures depicting individuals who were some of the first enslaved people to be freed from slavery by the law prior to the issuance of the Emancipation Proclamation.

Each sculpture depicts a different individual each with their own story and history, based on historical records associated with the Philipse Manor Hall State Historic Site located in Yonkers's Getty Square. The project was a 12-year endeavor and was completed in 2020.

The sculptures are as follows:

- I'Satta
- Themba
- Bibi
- Sola & Olumide.

The Philipse Manor Hall and the Enslaved Africans' Raingarden, along with Bagwell's The First Lady of Jazz sculpture of Ella Fitzgerald are stops on African American Heritage Trail of Westchester County.

== Victory Beyond Sims ==
Victory Beyond Sims is a planned sculpture by Bagwell that is being created to replace the sculpture of J. Marion Sims in New York City's Central Park that was torn down in 2018. After the relocation of the statue, the city called for a replacement sculpture. The four finalists chosen were Bagwell, Simone Leigh, Wangechi Mutu, and Kehinde Wiley. The city eventually decided on Simone Leigh in a 4–3 vote. The decision caused outrage amongst the community as they believed that Bagwell deserved to win.

Simone Leigh saw the backlash and decided to withdraw her proposal in order to hand the win to Bagwell. Leigh said in response, "I greatly appreciate that my proposal was selected by the committee. However, I am aware that there is significant community sentiment for another proposal. Since this is a public monument in their neighborhood, I defer to them and have withdrawn my work."

The statue is planned to be installed at some point in 2021 once the approval process and revisions have taken place.

== Commendations ==
1. In October 2020, Americans for the Arts awarded Bagwell the inaugural Jorge and Darlene Pérez Prize in Public Art & Civic Design award for he continued work in creating art for and supporting her community. The prize included a $30,000 prize as well as the ability to take part in additional learning opportunities and discussion with other nationally recognized artistic leaders.
2. On April 1, 2021, ArtsWestchester awarded Bagwell with their annual Artist award alongside six other individuals. Her work on her Enslaved Africans' Raingarden project in Yonkers is what earned her the honor for this award.

== Awards ==
In 2017, Bagwell was a recipient of the Trailblazers Award bestowed by the African American Advisory Board of Westchester County.
