= Thomas Paine Cottage =

Historic house in New York, United States

- U.S. National Register of Historic Places
- U.S. National Historic Landmark
- New York State Register of Historic Places
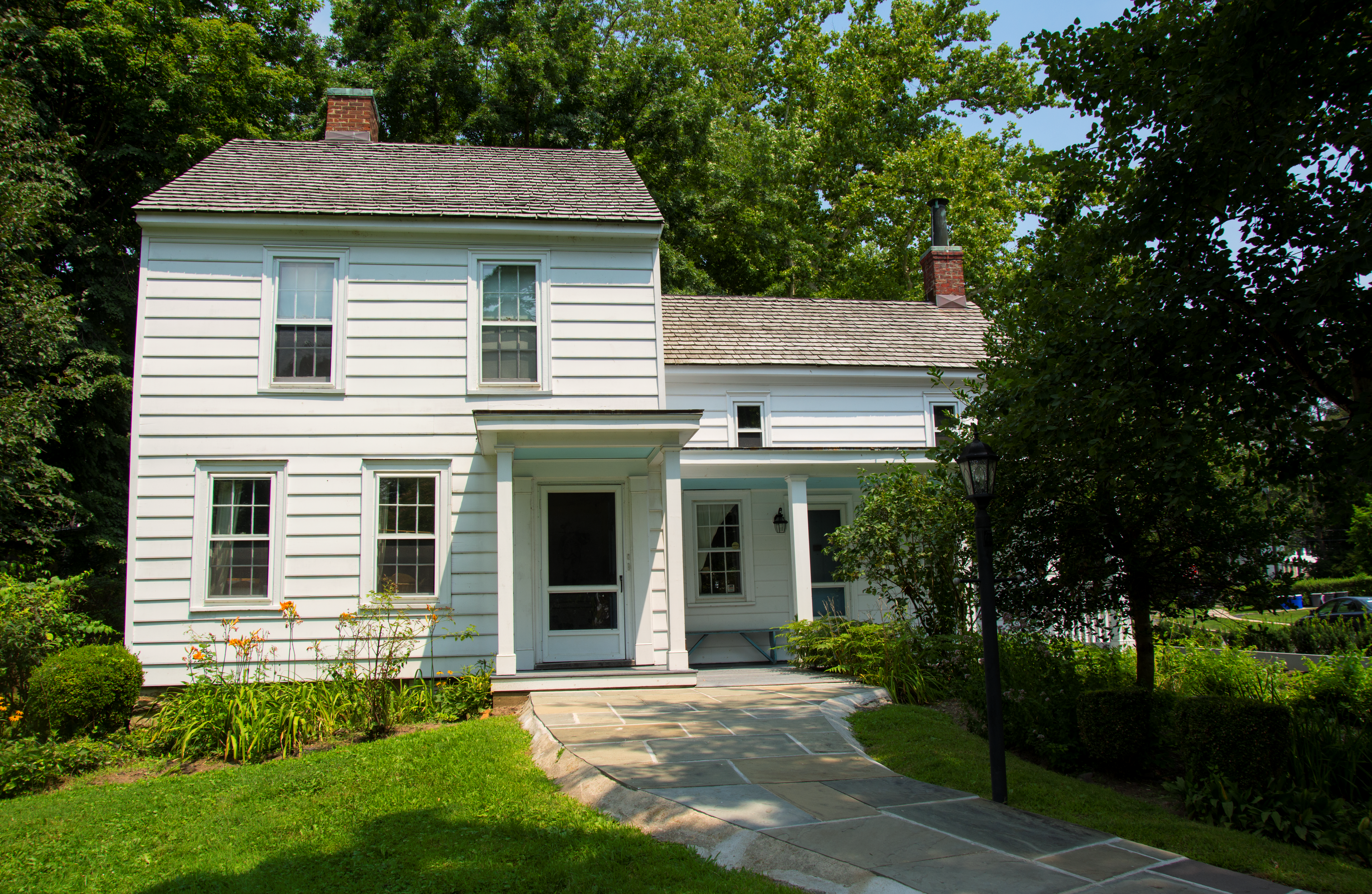

- Location within New York Location within the United States
- Interactive map showing the location of Thomas Paine College
- Location: 20 Sicard Avenue, New Rochelle, New York, USA
- Coordinates: 40°56′4.1″N 73°47′28.2″W
- Area: 2 acres (0.81 ha)
- Architectural style: Saltbox with Greek Revival elements
- NRHP reference No.: 72000920
- NYSRHP No.: 11942.000747

Significant dates
- Added to NRHP: November 28, 1972
- Designated NHL: November 28, 1972
- Designated NYSRHP: June 23, 1980

The Thomas Paine Cottage in New Rochelle, New York, in the United States, was the home from 1802 to 1806 of Thomas Paine, author of Common Sense, U.S. Founding Father, and Revolutionary War hero. Paine was buried near the cottage from his death in 1809 until his body was disinterred in 1819. It was one of a number of buildings located on the 300 acre farm given to Paine by the State of New York in 1784, in recognition of his services in the cause of Independence. It was here in August 1805 that he wrote his last pamphlet, which was addressed to the citizens of Philadelphia on "Constitutional Reform".

The cottage has been owned by the "Huguenot and New Rochelle Historical Association" and has been operated as a historic house museum since 1910. The cottage is open to the public most Fridays, Saturdays and Sundays 10–5 p.m.. There are numerous weekend events scheduled at the cottage throughout the year including their Colonial Fair in the spring and Colonial Tavern night during ArtsFest in October and a Toys for Tots drive in December. The cottage hosts many local school field trips.

== Architecture ==
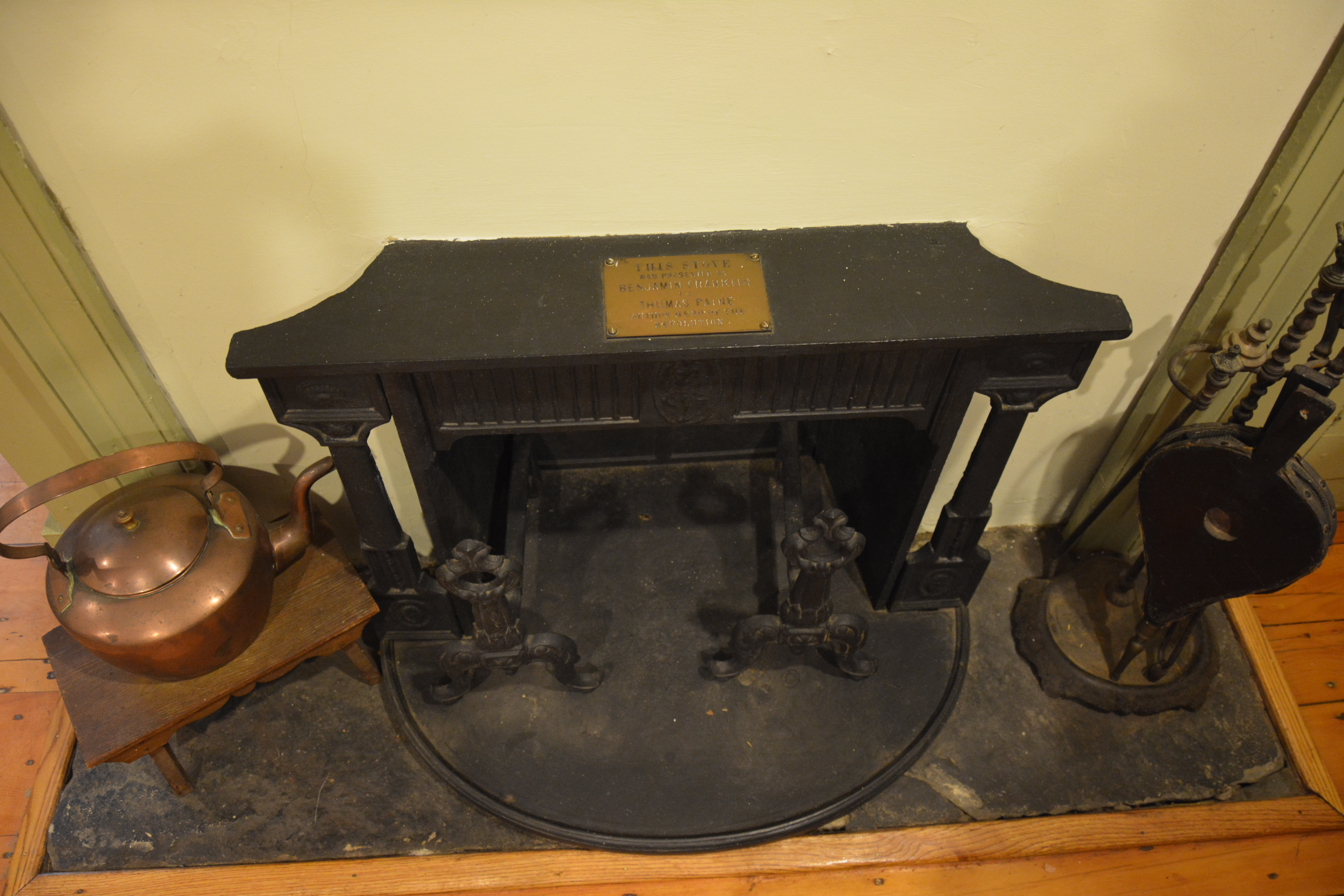
The house's Franklin stove

The cottage is a two-story wood-frame saltbox structure. It began as a simple building 16 feet (4.9 m) wide and 31 feet (9.4 m) deep. In 1804, an additional 18 by 23 feet (5.5 by 7.0 m) wing with a porch was constructed. An exterior door and porch pillars in the Greek Revival style were added in about 1830. The main house has three rooms set one behind the other; the kitchen in front, a common room in the center and a bedroom in the rear. The wing to the right contains the parlor and there are four bedrooms on the second floor. The entrance door and the pillars of the porch on the wing are Greek Revival and were added about 1830. The current arrangement has rooms decorated in the late 18th and early 19th century style as well as exhibits pertaining to the history of New Rochelle, the local Siwanoy Indians, and the Huguenots.

The front door to the cottage enters directly into its main room, which is maintained as the "Huguenot Room". The desk is said to have belonged to Jacques Flandreau, an early Huguenot settler of the town. Over the desk is a steel engraving from the celebrated painting at Versailles showing King Henry IV of France (Henry of Navarre) entering Paris through the unfinished Porte-Neuve on the morning of March 22, 1594.

The rear room on the first floor is known as the "Paine Room". On Christmas Eve, 1805, a gun was fired into this room in an attempt on Paine's life. He described the incident in a letter:

Whatever the gun was charged with passed through about three or four inches below the window making a hole large enough to (allow) a finger to go through -the muzzle must have been very near as the place is black with powder, and the glass of the window is shattered to pieces.

There are several interesting items in this room. There are two chairs used by Paine when he boarded at Bayeau's Tavern, almost directly across North Avenue. Another item is the stove set in the chimney. It was presented by Benjamin Franklin to Thomas Paine, and is one of the few real Franklin stoves in existence. Still another item is a warming pan which belonged to Mrs. Sarah Bache (1774-1808), daughter of Benjamin Franklin and wife of Richard Bache who was postmaster-general of the United States from 1776 to 1782.

=== Restoration ===
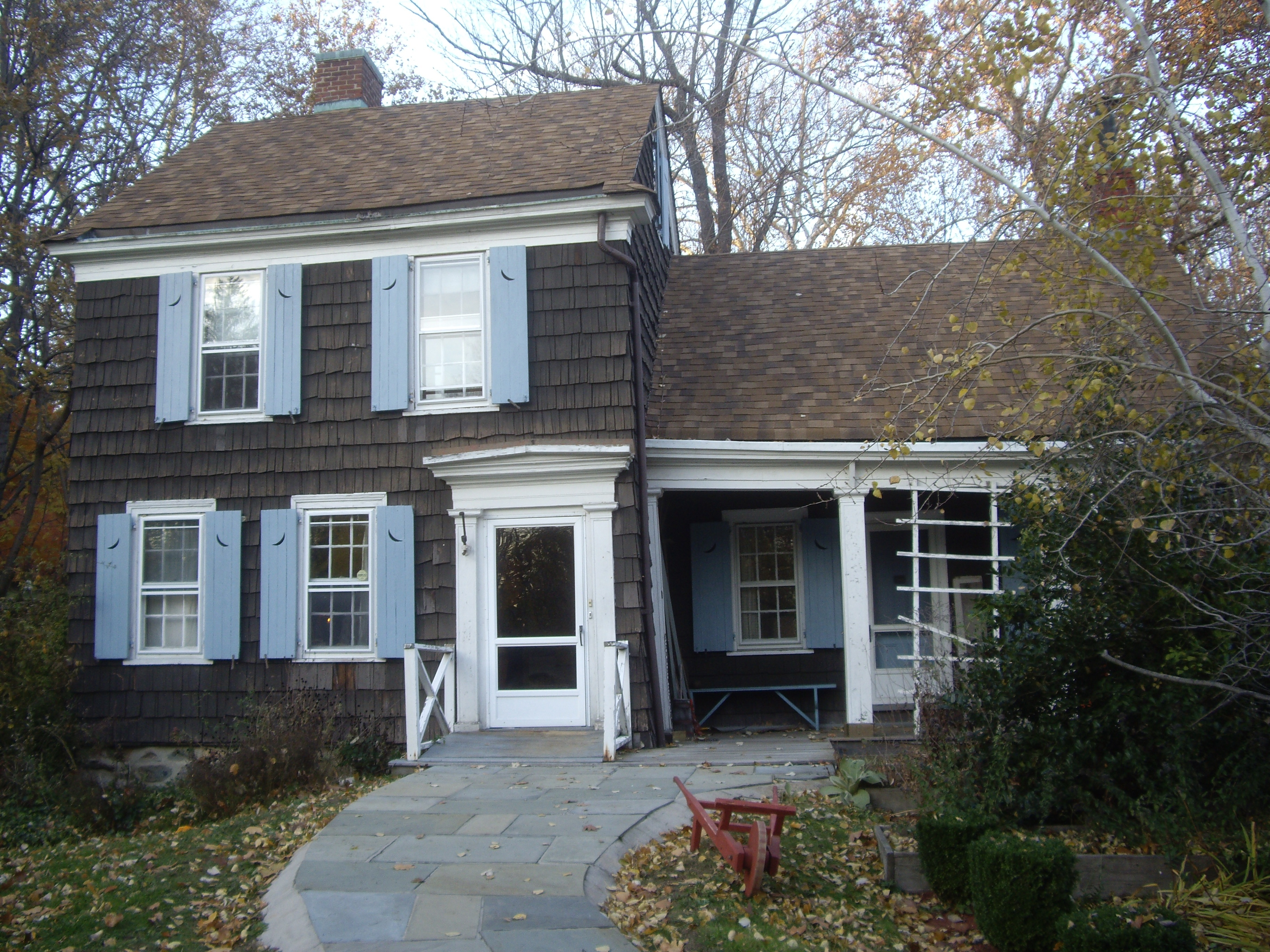
The house before restoration

A 2009 restoration project at the Cottage has enabled the site to more accurately relate the story of the building once owned by one of the leading figures in America's fight for Independence. The stewards of the Cottage, members of the Huguenot and New Rochelle Historical Association, were able to raise funds to complete critically needed repairs on the 200+ year old building. In the process, the group also recognized the need to return the building to its original integrity, to the extent documented in archival photographs and by physical evidence. With a $50,000 grant obtained by State Assemblywoman Amy Paulin and individual donations, the Association hired local architect John Woodruff and the restoration firm, Salem Preservation, Inc. of Salem, NY, for the exterior's restoration. As the Cottage is also a locally designated property, the New Rochelle Historical and Landmarks Review Board reviewed all aspects of the project before it moved forward.

The work included the removal of the asphalt roof and replacement with wood shingles, which also included exposing two original windows on the upper floor. Other major work to restore the building to its original integrity involved the reconstruction of a separate roof above the porch and below the windows and the replacement of wood shingles on the entire house with Weatherboard and the repair and replacement of gutters and wood trim.

== History ==
=== Thauvet-Besley-DeVeaux-Paine Farm ===
The park in which Paine's Cottage now stands is a very small section of the Thomas Paine farm. This farm in turn was a part of the original purchase of four hundred acres of land, made in 1690, by Andre Thauvet, one of the first Huguenot settlers of New Rochelle. Thauvet deeded two hundred and seventy-six acres to Captain Oliver Besley, another Huguenot, then a Justice of the Peace and at one time the commanding officer of the local company of militia. By the time of the American Revolution, the property was owned by Tory Frederick DeVeaux/Davoue. During the Revolution Davoue remained loyal to the British crown. His active participation against the patriot cause, both in civil and military affairs, brought upon him a conviction for treason against the State of New York which resulted in the confiscation of his property. DeVeaux became a voluntary exile in Nova Scotia with other Tories. The farm was granted to Thomas Paine by act of New York State Legislature in 1784 in recognition of his "distinguished merit" and "eminent services rendered the United States in the progress of the late war." The large original stone farmhouse on the Davoue farm was destroyed by fire in 1793, during Paine's absence in France.

The 277-acre (112 ha) farm was originally owned by the Tory Frederick DeVeaux (sometimes spelled "Davoue"), but was confiscated after the war. 320 acres (130 ha) including the farm were presented to Paine in 1784 by act of the New York State Legislature for his service.

=== Huguenot Association ===
The Huguenot Association acquired the house from Charles See, who wanted to subdivide the property for real estate development. It was moved approximately 440 yards (400 m) west to its current location at 20 Sicard Avenue in 1908. This is the last extant portion of the original farm owned by Paine.

The current cottage was built in 1793 near the site of the Davoue house on the south side of Paine Lane, now called Paine Avenue. This house was built in two parts, the present westerly section, soon after 1793, and the easterly addition probably about 1804. Paine owned the property for twenty five years and appears to have leased it a large part of the time. He made no pretensions of being a farmer, and his letters clearly show that writing was his chief occupation and farm operations were of secondary importance. He described the farm in a letter to Thomas Jefferson in 1804:

It is a pleasant and healthy situation commanding a prospect always green and peaceable as New Rochelle produces a great deal of grass and hay. The farm contains acres, about of which is meadow land, grazing and tillage land and the remainder wood land.

=== Preservation of the Cottage ===
The erection of the Thomas Paine Monument in 1839 was followed by several attempts to preserve the cottage in which Paine had lived as an additional Memorial. One of the most ambitious of these was in 1850 when not only the cottage itself was purchased, but also a considerable part of the original farm. This project was later abandoned and the property sold. It was not until 1908 that the efforts to preserve the cottage were successful. In that year it became necessary either to remove the house to a new location or demolish it outright. The owner, Charles W. Seer, generously gifted it to the New Rochelle Huguenot Association who in turn approved the purchase of the park in which the cottage now stands, which was a portion of the Paine farm. The cottage was removed to its present site, repaired, and outfitted as a museum and historical headquarters. It was dedicated on July 14, 1910, and formally opened to the public.

== Cottage grounds ==
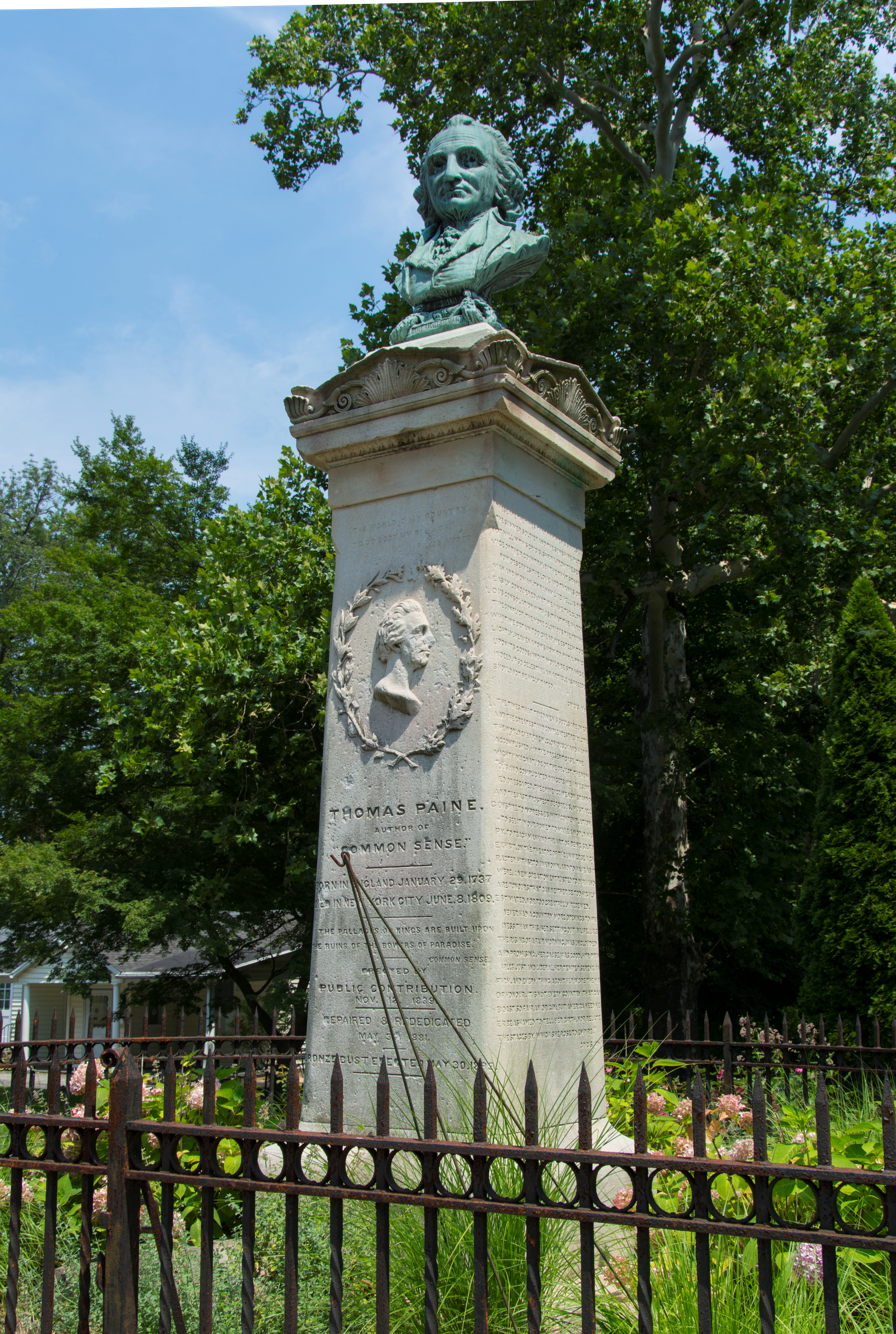
The Thomas Paine Monument on North Avenue in New Rochelle

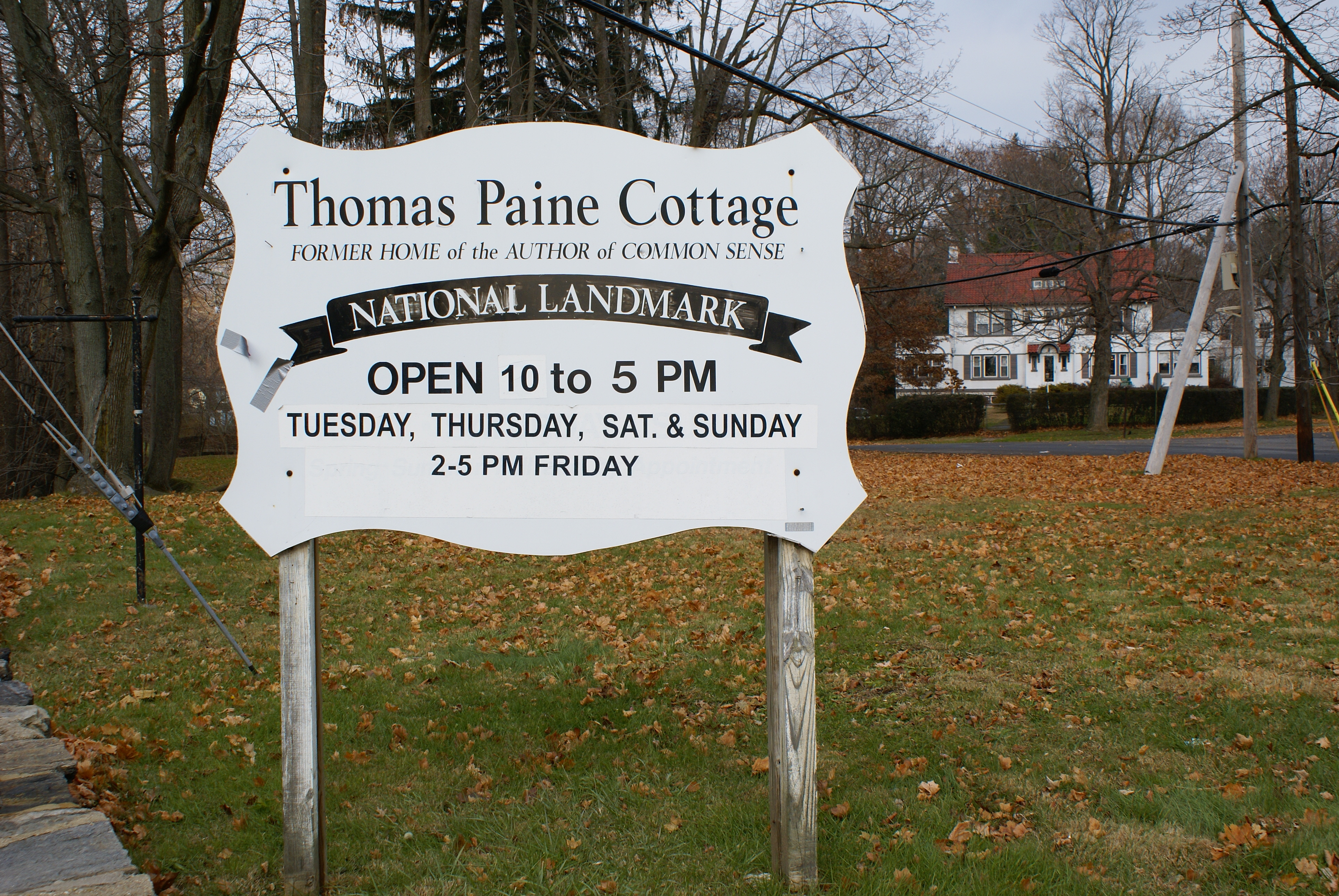

=== Burial Site ===
Paine died in Greenwich Village, New York on June 8, 1809. He wanted to be buried in the Quaker cemetery but, due to his writings, he was refused. His few remaining friends brought his body back to New Rochelle and interred on his farm as directed by his will:

I know not if the Society of People called Quakers admit a person to be buried in their burying Ground, who does not belong to their Society, but if they do or will admit me, I would prefer being buried there my father belonged to that profession, and I was partly brought up in it. But if it is not consistent with their rules to do this I desire to be buried on my farm at New Rochelle. The place where I am to be buried to be a square of twelve feet, to be enclosed with Rows of Trees, and a Stone or Post & rail fence, with a headstone with my name and age engraved upon it, Author of 'Common Sense'.

The site chosen for the grave was in the northwest corner of the field immediately south of the old Davoue Farm lane near the intersection with North Avenue. The site was marked by a marble headstone and was enclosed by a low stone wall.

In 1819, the English radical William Cobbett removed Paine's remains to England to build a larger memorial, but Cobbett died before succeeding and the remains disappeared. Dr. Moncure D. Conway claimed to have recovered a portion of Paine's brain around 1905; it was subsequently buried under the monument on October 14, 1905. The search for portions of Paine's body continues; in 2001, DNA tests were proposed for a portion of what was claimed to be his skull.

=== Museum ===
Located adjacent to the cottage is a 1925 museum dedicated to Paine created by the Thomas Paine National Historical Association. The organization, founded in 1905, is not connected either to the cottage or to the Huguenot and New Rochelle Historical Association. In 2005, the association controversially sold off a significant portion of its holdings (including a first edition of Common Sense) to pay for repairs to the museum building.

=== Monument ===
The creation of the Thomas Paine monument was organized and carried to completion by Paine biographer and radical New York publisher, educator, and reformer Gilbert Vale. Vale's fellow American radical and Workingman, the sculptor and architect John Frazee, created the marble monument itself. An 1881 bronze bust of Paine by Wilson McDonald was later added. It was moved next to the current location of the cottage in 1905. It is owned by the city of New Rochelle.

=== Brewster Schoolhouse ===
The Sophia Brewster One-Room Schoolhouse, the oldest private school in New Rochelle, was also moved to the property.
