= Thomas Paine Monument =

Thomas Paine

Coordinates: 40.9345436°N 73.7917315°W

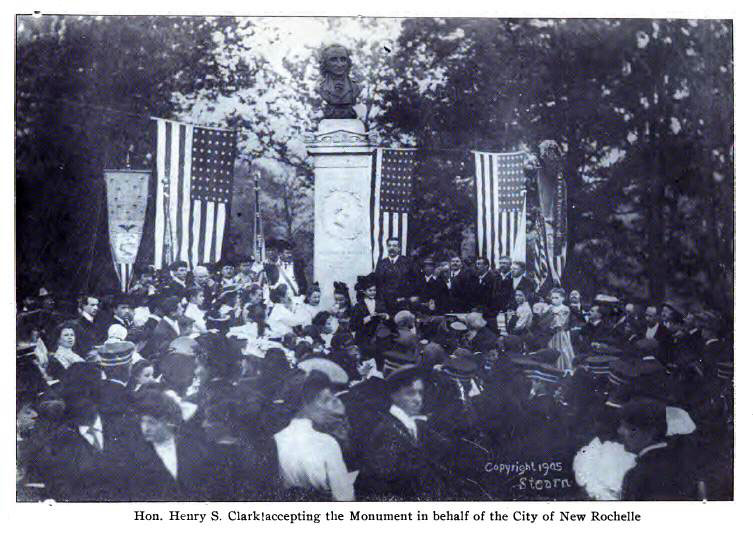
Mayor Henry Clark accepting the Thomas Paine Monument on behalf of the City of New Rochelle, 1905

The Thomas Paine Monument located in New Rochelle, New York is dedicated to the memory of Founding Father Thomas Paine. The monument stands on North Avenue at the entrance to Paine Avenue. This is the oldest extant memorial to Thomas Paine. The original monument erected in 1839 consisted of just the tapered marble pedestal and capital. A bronze bust of Paine was later added in 1899.

== Detail ==
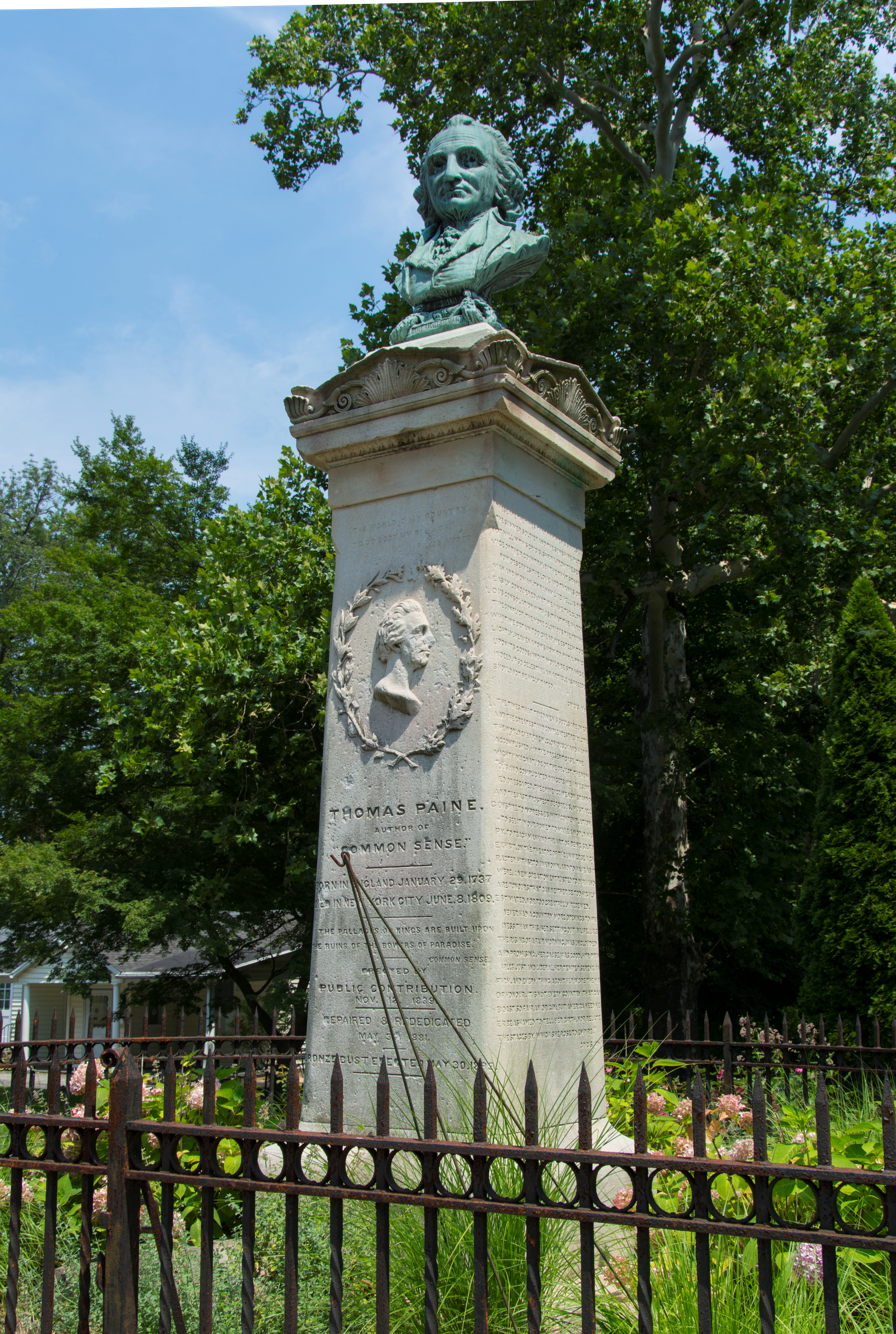
The monument in 2015

The creation of the monument was organized and carried to completion through the efforts of Paine biographer and New York publisher, Gilbert Vale and funded through public subscription. Sculptor and architect John Frazee created the marble monument itself on an 18 x 20 foot plot cut out of the lane and enclosed on three sides by a stone wall, and an iron fence and gate on the fourth. The monument suffered significant damage from vandals and relic hunters between 1839 and 1881. Parts of the inscription were defaced and the square corners of both the base and shaft were broken off. In the latter year the monument was repaired and restored as far as possible, the broken and ragged corners were rounded and parts of the inscription re-cut. This work was done at the instance of the Liberal Club of New York City, after which a re-dedication ceremony was held on May 30, 1881.

The bronze bust of Paine surmounting the original monument was modeled by sculptor James Wilson Alexander MacDonald. It was presented to the Thomas Paine Historical Association, and was placed on the capstone of the monument early in 1899. Soon thereafter the widening of North Avenue together with the opening of the present Paine Avenue as a public street over the identical course of the original Davoue and Paine lane, necessitated the removal of the monument from its original position. In 1905 the monument was placed in its present location in the center of Paine Avenue. Up to this time its care had been in the hands of private organizations and the Thomas Paine Historical Association, but on October 14, 1905, the monument was formally presented to and accepted by the City of New Rochelle.

The bust of Paine measures approximately 4 feet x 4 feet x 3 feet and the marble pedestal is approximately 10-1/2 feet x 3 feet 7 inches x 3 feet 7 inches. The monument rests on a base which is approximately 8 inches x 6 feet 7 inches x 6 feet 7 inches in measurement.
