= Okechukwu =

Okechukwu // is a given name and a surname. People with the given name are sometimes known as Okey.

Notable people with the name include:

== Given name ==
- Okechukwu Amah (fl. from 2009), Nigerian academic
- Okechukwu Emeka, or John Okechukwuemeka (born 18 July 1962), Nigerian politician
- Okechukwu Enelamah (born 1964), Nigerian politician
- Okechukwu Nwadiuto Emuchay (born 1960), Nigerian politician
- Okechukwu Ezea (born 1963), Nigerian politician, lawyer, and businessman
- Okechukwu Ibeanu (fl. from 2004), Nigerian professor
- Okechukwu Ikejiani (fl. from 1948), Nigerian doctor and politician
- Christian Irobiso (Okechukwu Christian Irobiso, born 1993), Nigerian footballer
- Okechukwu Odita (born 1983), Nigerian footballer
- Okechukwu Ofiaeli (fl. from 2000), Nigerian environmental artist
- Okechukwu Okoroha (born 1990), Nigerian player of American football
- Okechukwu Okoye (died 2022), murdered Nigerian politician
- Okechukwu Oku, also known as Okey Oku and nicknamed "the Oracle", Nigerian film producer, director, cinematographer
- Okechukwu Onuchukwu (fl. from 2021), Nigerian professor of economics
- Okechukwu Edwards Ukeje (born 1974), Nigerian rapper known as Mr Raw
- OC Ukeje (Okechukwu Ukeje, born 1981), Nigerian actor

== Surname ==
- Aliyu Okechukwu (born 1995), Nigerian footballer
- Azubuike Okechukwu (born 1997), Nigerian footballer
- Duncan Wene Mighty Okechukwu (born 1983), Nigerian musician known as Duncan Mighty
- Salas Okechukwu (born 1989), Nigerian footballer
- Uche Okechukwu (born 1967), Nigerian footballer

== See also ==
- Okey (disambiguation)
