= Opie =

Opie may refer to:

- Opie (name), a list of people and fictional characters with the given name, nickname, or surname
- OPIE Authentication System, a one-time password authentication system for Unix based on S/KEY

== See also ==
- Okey (disambiguation)
- Okie (disambiguation)
- opy, ISO 639-3 code for the Ofayé language of Brazil
