= Okey (surname) =

Okey is a surname, and may refer to:

- Chris Okey (born 1994), American baseball player
- Frank Okey (1919–2023), American tennis and squash champion
- Henry Okey (1857–1918), New Zealand politician
- Howard Okey (1906–1985), Australian rules footballer
- Jack Okey (1889–1963), American art director
- John Okey (1606–1662), English soldier, Member of Parliament and regicide
- John W. Okey (1827–1885), American judge and legal author
- Mark Okey (fl. 2007–2010), American attorney and politician in Ohio
- Samuel Okey (fl. 1765–1780), British mezzotint engraver
- Shannon Okey (born 1975), American writer and knit designer
- Thomas Okey (1852–1935), British expert on basket weaving, translator of Italian, writer on art

== See also ==
- Okey (disambiguation)
