= John Goldar =

English engraver

John Goldar (1729–1795) was an English engraver.

== Life ==
Born at London in 1738, Goldar resided in Charlotte Street, Blackfriars Road, Southwark. He made a couple of forays into print publishing on his own account (of John Dixon after William Lawrenson, and much later of naval prints and after Henry Richter), but mostly worked for the book trade.

On 16 August 1795 Goldar died suddenly of apoplexy, while walking with his daughter through Hyde Park, London.

== Works ==
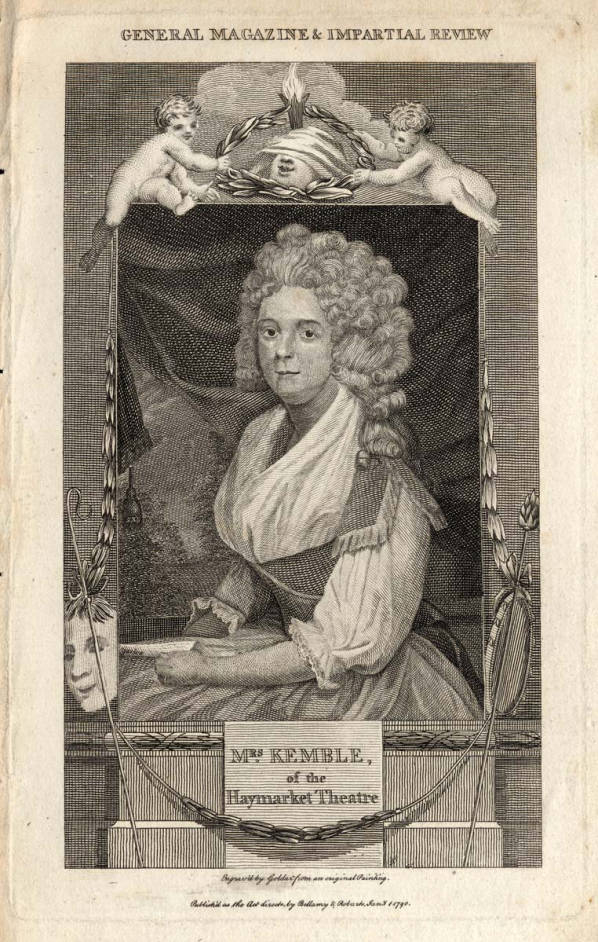
The actress Elizabeth Satchell, engraving by John Goldar

Goldar is best known for his engravings of the pictures painted by John Collet, in imitation of William Hogarth. Four of these, published by John Boydell in 1782, represent a series entitled "Modern Love", and among others were The Recruiting Sergeant, The Female Bruisers, The Sacrifice, The Country Choristers, and The Refusal. Similar subject matter was in his engravings after Philip Dawe, Samuel Hieronymus Grimm and Herbert Pugh.

Goldar also engraved portraits, including those of the Rev. William Jay, James Lackington the bookseller, Peter Clare the surgeon, and others. In 1771 he exhibited an unfinished proof of an engraving after John Hamilton Mortimer at the exhibition of the Incorporated Society of Artists.

As an illustrator, Goldar's work included a History of England (1789) for John Harrison. This was based, at some distance, on that by Paul de Rapin. He also had some plates in The New English Theatre (1777) published by Lowndes.

== Notes ==
Attribution

This article incorporates text from a publication now in the public domain: Stephen, Leslie; Lee, Sidney, eds. (1890). "Goldar, John". Dictionary of National Biography. Vol. 22. London: Smith, Elder & Co.
