= Okie (disambiguation) =

Okie is a term meaning a resident of the U.S. state of Oklahoma.

Okie may also refer to:

== Music ==
- Okie (J. J. Cale album), 1974
- Okie (Vince Gill album), 2019
- Okie Baroque, a 2010 EP by American indie rock band Blackpool Light
- Okie from Muskogee, a 1969 album by Merle Haggard and the Strangers
  - "Okie from Muskogee" (song), title single from the album, written by Roy Edward Burris and Merle Haggard

== People ==
- Okie Adams (1923–2007), American banjo maker
- Okie Blanchard (1903–1989), American college athlete and coach
- Eyabi Okie (born 1999), American football player
- R. Brognard Okie (1875–1945), American architect
- Elizabeth Okie Paxton (born Elizabeth Vaughan Okie; 1878–1972), American painter

== Other uses ==
- Okie, a type of fictional city in James Blish's space story series Cities in Flight
- Okie dialect, a dialect of American English associated with Oklahoma; Southern American English
- Okie dokie, slang for "okay"
- Okie Noodling, a 2001 American documentary film

== See also ==
- Oakie (disambiguation)
- Oke (disambiguation)
- Okey (disambiguation)
