= Henry Sherburne (colonel) =

Officer in the Continental Army during the American Revolution

- Born: August 3, 1748; Newport, Rhode Island
- Died: May 21, 1824 (aged 75)
- Allegiance: Continental Army
- Service years: May 1775 - January 1781
- Rank: Colonel

Colonel Henry Sherburne (1748-1824) was an officer in the Continental Army during the American Revolutionary War. He commanded Sherburne's Additional Continental Regiment from 1777 to 1781, and served as the General Treasurer of Rhode Island from 1792 to 1807.

== Early life ==
Henry Sherburne was born in Newport, Rhode Island, on August 3, 1748. He was the son of Benjamin Sherburne, a colonel in the Rhode Island Militia.

== Revolutionary War ==
Sherburne was commissioned as the major of Church's Regiment (a.k.a. 3rd Rhode Island Regiment) in May 1775. He served with this unit during the Siege of Boston until it was discharged on December 31, 1775.

On January 1, 1776, he became the major of the 15th Continental Regiment. He was captured at the Battle of The Cedars near Montreal in May 1776, as the result of a plan formulated by Jean-Baptiste-Jérémie Testard Louvigny de Montigny (1741 - 1799), a son of Jacques Testard de Montigny. and was later exchanged. He was noted for his heroism at the Battle of Trenton in December 1776, where he led a successful bayonet charge. On January 1, 1777, he became the major of the 1st Rhode Island Regiment, commanded by Colonel James Varnum. He held this position for only a few days before he was given command of his own regiment.

=== Sherburne's Additional Continental Regiment ===
On January 12, 1777, Sherburne was commissioned as colonel of his own regiment, named Sherburne's Additional Continental Regiment, one of sixteen regiments authorized by the Continental Congress to expand the Continental Army. The regiment consisted of soldiers mostly recruited in Rhode Island, Connecticut, and Massachusetts.

The regiment was at Valley Forge, Pennsylvania, during the winter of 1777 to 1778 and was engaged at the Battle of Rhode Island in August 1778. In 1779 the regiment was stationed at West Point, New York where its soldiers built Sherburne's Redoubt, a small fortification covering the land approaches to Fort Clinton. The regiment was also located in the area around White Plains, New York.

It was also engaged at the Battle of Staten Island on January 15, 1780. It was disbanded in January 1781 when it was consolidated with the 1st and 2nd Rhode Island regiments to form the Rhode Island Regiment.

Colonel Sherburne served in command of the regiment until it was disbanded on January 1, 1781. He was retired from the Continental Army at the same time since there was a surplus of higher-ranking officers.

== Post war ==
Sherburne lived in Newport, Rhode Island, after the war. In 1782, he served as a deputy from Newport in the Rhode Island General Assembly. In 1783, he became an original member of the Rhode Island Society of the Cincinnati. He also served as the Society's secretary from 1784 to 1786 and as its vice president from 1786 to 1788.

In May 1785 he was commissioned as the lieutenant colonel commandant of the Newport County Regiment of the Rhode Island Militia. He held the position for one year.

On May 29, 1785 he was married to Katherine Honeyman Tweedy (1740-1815) of Newport, who was the granddaughter of Reverend James Honyman, a longtime rector of Trinity Church in Newport. Sherburne was a member of Trinity Church for most of his life.

In January 1790, shortly before Rhode Island ratified the U.S. Constitution, he wrote to President Washington asking to be appointed collector of the port of Newport. In the letter he mentioned that during the British occupation of Newport (1776-1779) his home in Newport was burned by the British which left his mother and two "maiden sisters" homeless. Sherburne did not receive the appointment. That same year, he was appointed a Justice of the Peace for Newport.

In 1792 Sherburne was elected as a vestryman of Trinity Church and in April 1794 he was appointed to the standing committee of the church. He stepped down from the church vestry in 1814 after 22 years of service and was voted "grateful thanks" by the congregation of the church for his long service. He was the owner of pew number 27.

== Public service ==
Colonel Sherburne was elected in October 1792 as General Treasurer of Rhode Island by the General Assembly to fill a vacancy in the office. He was re-elected annually and served until May 1807.

On January 6, 1800, he was one of six pall bearers at a mock funeral held in Newport to honor the passing of President Washington.

In 1817 he served on a mission to negotiate with the Choctaw and Chickasaw Indians for which he received the thanks of Congress.

== Death and burial ==
Colonel Sherburne died insolvent at the age of 75 on May 21, 1824. He was buried in the churchyard of Trinity Church in Newport.
