= Oke =

Oke or OKE may refer to:

== As a word ==
- Oke (name), both a surname and a given name; includes a list of notable people with this name
- Oke, Alberta, a locality in Yellowhead County, Alberta, Canada
- Oke or oké, variations of "okay"
- Oke, a variant of oka (mass), an Ottoman measure of mass
- Ōke (王家), branches of the Japanese Imperial Family

== As an acronym or abbreviation ==
- ΟΚΕ, the fraternity Omicron Kappa Epsilon
- OKE, IATA airport code of Okinoerabu Airport in Kagoshima Prefecture, Japan
- OKE, station code of Okehampton railway station in Okehampton, England
- oke, ISO 639-3 code of the Okpe language (Southwestern Edo), an Edoid language of Nigeria
- OKE: Operation Kill Everything, a 2013 mixtape by The Game

== See also ==
- Oakie (disambiguation)
- Okey (disambiguation)
- Okie (disambiguation)
