= Sherburne's Additional Continental Regiment =

Unit of the Continental Army

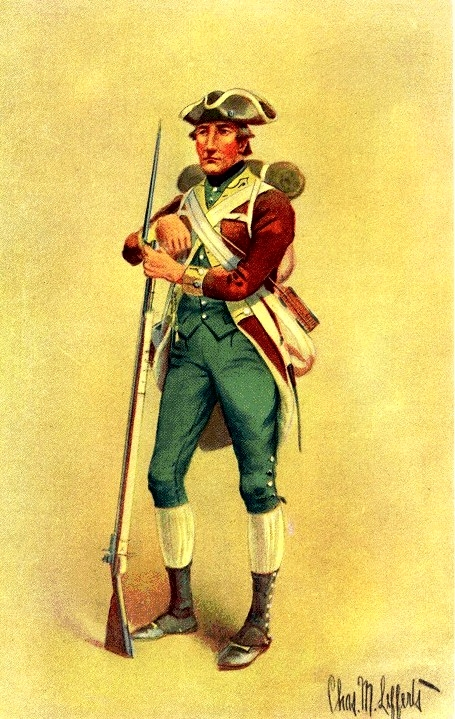
Soldier of the Sherburne's Regiment, by Charles M. Lefferts.

Sherburne's Additional Continental Regiment (a.k.a. Sherburne's Battalion) was a unit of the Continental Army which served from January 1, 1777, until it was disbanded on January 1, 1781. It was commanded by Colonel Henry Sherburne.

== History ==
Sherburne's Regiment was one of sixteen additional regiments authorized by the Continental Congress in late 1776. It was organized on January 12, 1777, with soldiers mostly recruited from Rhode Island and Connecticut. It was at Valley Forge, Pennsylvania during the winter of 1777 to 1778 and was engaged at the Battle of Rhode Island in August 1778. In 1779 the regiment was stationed at West Point, New York, where they built Sherburne's Redoubt - a small fortification covering the land approaches to Fort Clinton.

It was also engaged at the Battle of Staten Island on January 15, 1780. It was disbanded in January 1781 when it was consolidated with the 1st and 2nd Rhode Island regiments to form the Rhode Island Regiment.

== Field Officers ==
- Colonel Henry Sherburne (January 12, 1777, to January 1, 1781)(see below)
- Lieutenant Colonel Return J. Meigs (February 22, 1777, to May 12, 1777)
- Major William Bradford (January 12, 1777, to January 1, 1781)

== Colonel Henry Sherburne ==
Colonel Henry Sherburne was born on August 3, 1748, and was commissioned as the major of Church's Regiment (a.k.a. 3rd Rhode Island Regiment) in May 1775. He served with this unit during the Siege of Boston.

On January 1, 1776, he became the major of the 15th Continental Regiment, commanded by Colonel John Paterson, and was captured at the Cedars near Montreal in May 1776 and was later exchanged. He was noted for his heroism at the Battle of Trenton in December 1776 where he led a successful bayonet charge. On January 1, 1777, he became the major of the 1st Rhode Island Regiment.

On January 12, 1777, Sherburne was commissioned as colonel of his own regiment named Sherburne's Additional Continental Regiment, one of sixteen regiments authorized by the Continental Congress to expand the Continental Army. He served in this position until the regiment was disbanded on January 1, 1781, and retired from the Continental Army shortly afterwards.

Sherburne lived in Newport, Rhode Island, after the war. In 1782 he served as a deputy from Newport in the Rhode Island General Assembly. In 1783 he became an original member of the Rhode Island Society of the Cincinnati and served as the Society's secretary.

On May 29, 1785, he was married to Katherine Honeyman Tweedy (1740-1815) of Newport, who was the granddaughter of Reverend James Honeyman, a longtime rector of Trinity Church.

In January 1790, shortly before Rhode Island ratified the U.S. Constitution, he wrote to President Washington asking to be appointed collector of the port of Newport. Sherburne did not receive the appointment.

In 1792 he was elected as a vestryman of Trinity Church and in April 1794 he was appointed to the standing committee of the church. He stepped down from the church vestry in 1814 after 22 years of service and was voted "grateful thanks" by the congregation of the church for his long service. He was the owner of pew number 27.

In 1817 he served on a mission to negotiate with the Choctaw and Chickasaw Indians for which he received the thanks of Congress.

Colonel Sherburne was elected in October 1792 as General Treasurer of Rhode Island by the General Assembly to fill a vacancy in the office and served until 1807.

On January 6, 1800, he was one of six pall bearers at a mock funeral held in Newport to honor the passing of President Washington.

Colonel Sherburne died insolvent at the age of 75 on May 21, 1824. He was buried in the churchyard of Trinity Church in Newport.
