= Okołowicz =

Polish surname

Okołowicz (Polish pronunciation: [ɔkɔˈwɔvit͡ʂ]), sometimes spelled Okolowicz, is a Polish surname derived as a patronymic from the nickname Okół. Its archaic feminine forms are Okołowiczowa (by husband) and Okołowiczówna (by father). Its counterparts in East Slavic languages include Okolovich in Russian, Akalovich in Belarusian, and Okolovych in Ukrainian. The Lithuanized form is Okolovičius. Notable people with the surname include:

- August Okołowicz – French general (1838–1891)
- Édouard Okolowicz – French composer (1842–1888)
- Frank Okey (born Franciszek Okolowicz) – American tennis and squash player (1919–2023)
- Georgiy Okolovich – Russian anticommunist activist and chairman of the National Alliance of Russian Solidarists (1901–1980)
- Helena Okołowicz (née Łabędzka) – Polish painter and educator (1903–?)
- Ivan Akalovich – Belarusian machine gunner (1922–1989)
- Jeff Okolowicz – American musician, bassist for The Chesterfield Kings
- Józef Okołowicz – Polish diplomat and emigration advocate (1876–1923)
- Konstantin Okolovich – Russian politician and Orthodox priest (1872–1933)
- Mikhail Okolovich – Belarusian Russian Orthodox priest and hieromartyr (1888–1938)
- Mikalay Akalovich – Belarusian historian (born 1926)
- Mikołaj Krzywiec-Okołowicz – Polish noble, chamberlain to Stanisław August Poniatowski, and member of the Sejm (1762–1841)
- Nikolay Okolovich – Russian painter and curator (1867–1928)
- Norbert Okołowicz – Polish painter, social activist, and military officer (1890–1943)
- Ted Okolowicz – American musician, guitarist for The Chesterfield Kings
- Vladimir Okolovich – Russian-Kazakh nuclear physicist (1933–2021)
- Wincenty Okołowicz – Polish geographer (1906–1979)
