= Okey (given name) =

Okey is a given name.

People with the given name Okechukwu are often known as Okey.

Notable people with the name or nickname include:

- Okey Amadi (fl. from 1999), Nigerian politician
- Okey Bakassi (born 1969), Nigerian stand-up comedian and actor
- Okey Emordi (Felix Okechukwu Emordi, fl. from 2004), Nigerian footballer
- Okey Geffin (Aaron Geffin, 1921–2004), South African rugby player
- Okey Isima (1956–2013), Nigerian footballer
- Okey Johnson (1834–1903), American lawyer, politician, judge, and educator
- Okey McCabe (1904–1977), South African cricket umpire
- Okey Ndibe (Okechukwu Ndibe, born 1960), Nigerian novelist, political columnist, and essayist
- Okey Ogunjiofor, (born 1964), Nigerian producer and actor
- Okey Patteson (1898–1989), America politician; 23rd Governor of West Virginia (1949–1953)
- Okey Uzoeshi (born 1983), Nigerian actor and musician
- Okey Wali (born 1958), Nigerian lawyer

== See also ==
- Okey (surname)
