= Oakie =

Oakie may refer to:

== People ==
- Clair H. "Oakie" Blanchard (1903–1989), American college athlete and coach
- Don Oakie (fl. 1950s), American bridge player
- Jack Oakie (1903–1978), American actor

== Other uses ==
- "Oakie", the sports mascot of State University of New York College of Environmental Science and Forestry (SUNY-ESF)
- Oakie Doke, a British children's television program (1995–1997)
- "Oakie Boogie", an American swing dance song written in 1947

== See also ==
- Oke (disambiguation)
- Okey (disambiguation)
- Okie (disambiguation)
