= Butler Clowes =

English engraver and printseller (died c.1788)

Butler Clowes (died c.1788) was an English mezzotint-engraver and printseller.

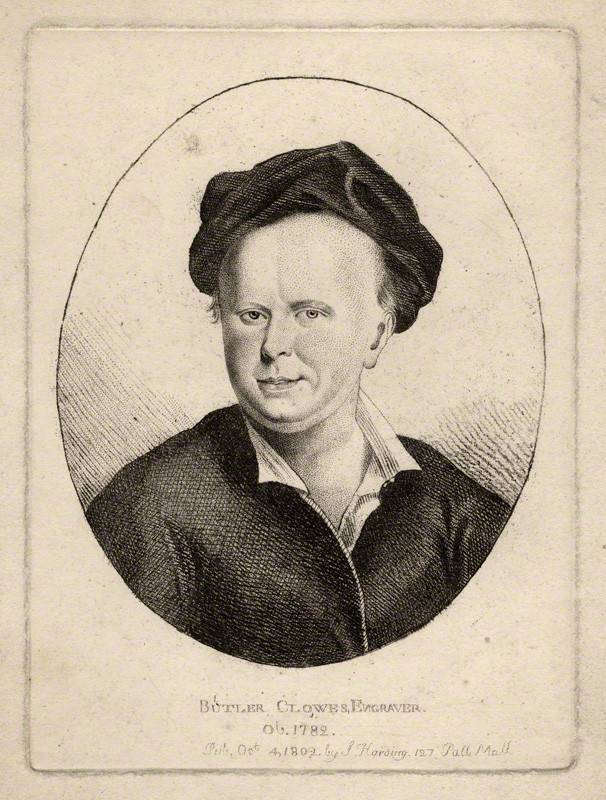
Butler Clowes, 1802 engraving

== Life ==
Clowes lived in Gutter Lane, Cheapside, London where he kept a print-shop, and his address appeared on engravings by James Watson and others.

== Works ==
Clowes made portraits in mezzotint, usually from the life, some of which he sent to the exhibitions of the Free Society of Artists from 1768 to 1773. Among those portraits were those of himself, his wife, John Augustus Clowes, John Glas, Nathan Potts, Mrs. Luke Sullivan after Tilly Kettle, and Charles Dibdin as Mungo in the opera of The Padlock. He also engraved in mezzotint:

- after Philip Dawe, The Hen-pecked Husband and The Dying Usurer, both exhibited in 1768;
- after John Collett, A Rescue, or the Tars Triumphant, Grown Gentlemen taught to dance, and The Female Bruisers, exhibited in 1771;
- after Egbert Jasperszoon van Heemskerk, and George Stubbs, and a print entitled Domestic Employment Starching, probably after Henry Morland.

== Notes ==
Attribution

This article incorporates text from a publication now in the public domain: Stephen, Leslie, ed. (1887). "Clowes, Butler". Dictionary of National Biography. Vol. 11. London: Smith, Elder & Co.
