= Samuel Okey =

Samuel Okey (fl. 1765–1780), the younger, was a British mezzotint engraver, in later life an emigrant to British North America.

== Life ==
Samuel Okey, eldest surviving son of Samuel Okey, a printseller in Fleet Street, London, and his wife Mary Atterbury, was born in the City of London on 21 February 1742. Nothing is known of his training as a mezzotint engraver, but those of his prints that are signed “Samuel Okey junior” were probably produced before the death of his father in 1768. As Samuel Okey junior, he obtained premiums in 1765 and 1767 from the Society of Arts. In 1770 he engraved a print Sweets of Liberty, after John Collett; this was published by him and Charles Reak, near Temple Bar, and it exhibits Wilkite sympathies.

In 1773, the names Okey and Reak appear as joint publishers of an engraved portrait by Okey of the Baptist minister Thomas Hiscox of Newport, Rhode Island, after the oil portrait by Robert Feke; and as "print sellers and stationers on the Parade", Newport, Rhode Island. They published a portrait of The Reverend James Honyman, rector of Trinity Church, Newport in 1774, after an oil portrait by G. Gains, as well as a portrait of the Massachusetts politician and American statesman Samuel Adams in 1775. It is uncertain whether Okey remained in America or returned to England.

== Works ==
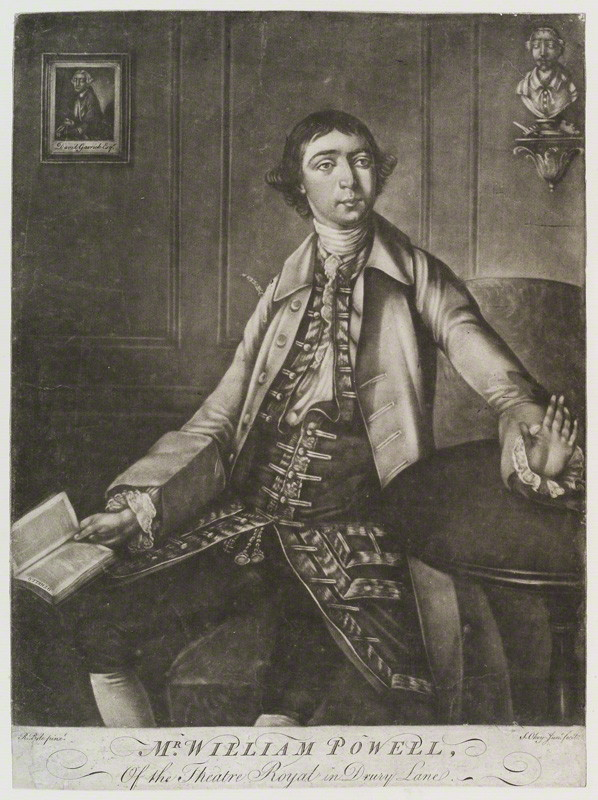
William Powell, engraving by Samuel Okey

Okey's first premium was for a mezzotint engraving of 'Nancy Reynolds', copied from one by Charles Phillips, after a portrait by Sir Joshua Reynolds. In 1767 he exhibited at the Incorporated Society of Artists an engraving of An Old Man with a Scroll after Reynolds, and in 1768 A Mezzotinto after Mr. Cosway.

Among Okey's earlier works were:

- Mrs. Anderson, after Robert Edge Pine;
- Lady Anne Dawson, after Reynolds;
- Miss Gunning, and The Gunnings as Hibernian Sisters;
- Nelly O'Brien, after Reynolds;
- William Powell the actor, after Robert Pyle;
- Miss Green and a Lamb, after Tilly Kettle; and
- A Burgomaster, after Frans Hals.

A print by him, A Modern Courtezan, was published in 1778, but may have been executed earlier.

== Notes ==
Attribution

This article incorporates text from a publication now in the public domain: Lee, Sidney, ed. (1895). "Okey, Samuel". Dictionary of National Biography. Vol. 42. London: Smith, Elder & Co.
