= John Collett (artist) =

English painter

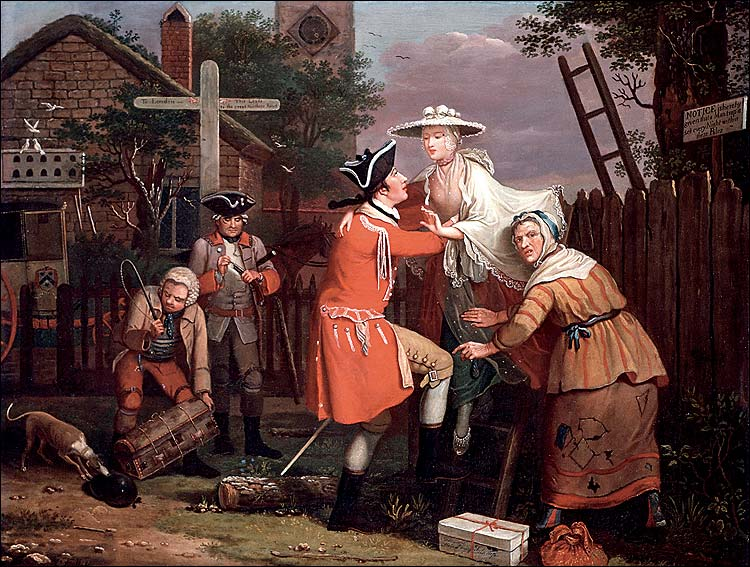
The Elopement, 1764

John Collet or Collett (1725 – 6 August 1780) was an English satirical artist.

== Life ==
He was born in London about 1725, and son of a gentleman holding a public office. He was a pupil of painter George Lambert, and studied at the art school in St Martin's Lane.

He first exhibited at the exhibition of the Free Society of Artists in 1761, to which he sent three landscapes. In 1762, he exhibited with the same society A Gipsy telling some Country Girls their Fortune.

From this time, though he occasionally exhibited landscapes, portraits, animals, and other subjects, his pictures are mainly of a humorous description, based on the style of William Hogarth, whose 'comedy in art' he strove to imitate, if not to surpass. There was a large demand for his pictures, and the engravings from them, many by first-class engravers, were published by Carington Bowles, Smith & Sayer, Boydell, and other well-known publishers.

Collett continued to exhibit with the Free Society of Artists up to 1783. His pictures give insight into manners at the end of the 18th century. In 1775, Richard Brinsley Sheridan brought out his comedy The Duenna and Collett drew pictures based on scenes in this play. One of them, representing the drinking scene in the convent (act iii. scene 5), was figured in Thomas Wright's History of Caricature and Grotesque in Art.

He inherited a fortune from a relation, and resided in Chelsea, London, where he died, in Cheyne Row, on 6 August 1780, and was buried there on 11 August.

== Assessment ==
Collet represented scenes of debauchery, low life, and social weaknesses and absurdities. He did not possess, however, the force and deep moral of Hogarth's work, and his pictures are often mere plagiarisms, appealing only to a vulgar taste. When, however, he cared to be original, he showed great ability, and his pictures are always carefully executed.

== Collections ==
Two water-colour pictures by Collett, entitled The Asylum for the Deaf and Promenaders in St. James's Park, went to the South Kensington Museum. In the print room of the British Museum there is a collection of engravings from his works., most of which are described in the Catalogue of Political and Personal Satires Preserved in the Department of Prints and Drawings in the British Museum. There is check list of his prints by David Alexander.

John Goldar engraved after him The Sacrifice, The Refusal, The Recruiting Sergeant, exhibited in 1767, The Female Bruisers, exhibited in 1768, and also engraved in mezzotint by Butler Clowes, The Spirit is Willing, but the Flesh is Weak, The Country Choristers, The Unlucky Attempt, The Discovery, The Mutual Embrace, and Modern Love, in four scenes, Courtship, The Elopement, The Honeymoon, Discordant Matrimony, painted in 1765, and published in 1782, after his death.

James Caldwall engraved The Gipsies, The Ladies' Disaster, The Bold Attempt, The Unwelcome Customer, The Guards of the Night defeated, A Macaroni taking his Morning Ride in Hyde Park, The Englishman in Paris, High Life below Stairs, The Cotillion Dancers, exhibited in 1772.

Among numerous others were: Sweets of Liberty and The City Chanters, in mezzotint by Samuel Okey; A Rescue, or the Tars Triumphant, and Grown Gentlemen taught to dance, in mezzotint by Butler Clowes; The Coaxing Wife and An Holland Smock to be run for, by the engraver Thomas Morris; January and May, by Charles Grignion; The Frenchman in London, by C. White; A Taylor riding to Brentford, by T. Stayner; Minerva protecting Innocence, by F. B. Lorieux; and A Snare laid by Love, by Jean-Baptiste Pillement.
