= Opie (name) =

Opie is a surname, a given name and a nickname. Notable people with the name include:

== Given name or nickname ==
- Opie Cates (1909–1987), American clarinet player
- Gregg Hughes, American radio personality, known by his air name Opie, former co-host of Opie and Anthony
- Opie Ortiz, American artist specializing in tattoos, pop art and murals
- Otto P. Weyland (1903–1979), United States Air Force general

== Surname ==
- Alan Opie (born 1945), British baritone singer
- Amelia Opie (1769–1853), English author; the wife of John Opie
- Catherine Opie (born 1961), American artist and photographer
- Chris Opie (born 1987), British racing cyclist
- Eugene Lindsay Opie (1873–1971), American pathologist
- Iona Opie (1923–2017), British specialist in children's literature and the customs of schoolchildren; the wife of Peter Opie
- John Opie (1761–1807), Cornish historical and portrait painter; the husband of Amelia Opie
- John N. Opie (1844–1906), American politician
- Julian Opie (born 1958), British artist known for his use of vector-based reproductions
- June Opie (1924–1999), New Zealand polio survivor and writer
- Lisa Opie (born 1963), English squash player
- Peter Opie (1918–1982), British specialist in children's literature and the customs of schoolchildren; the husband of Iona Opie
- Redvers Opie (1900–1984), British economist
- Robert Opie (born 1947), British item collector and the director of the Museum of Brands, Packaging and Advertising; son of Iona and Peter Opie
- Roger Opie (1927-1998), Australian-born Economist, Rhodes Scholar and Oxford academic

== Fictional characters ==
- Opie (Family Guy), on the animated TV series Family Guy
- Opie, a squirrel on the animated TV series Capitol Critters
- Opie, the titular character of the American film Opie Gets Laid
- Opie, Happy Lowman's beloved dog (named after the Sons of Anarchy SAMCRO member Opie Winston) that plays a pivotal role in Mayans M.C. season 2
- Opie Taylor, on the TV series The Andy Griffith Show
- Opie Winston, a SAMCRO member on the TV series Sons of Anarchy
