= Okey (disambiguation) =

Okey is a tile-based game.

Okey may also refer to:

- Okey (surname), including a list of people with the surname
- Okey (given name), including a list of people with the given name
- TV Okey, a Malaysian TV channel

== See also ==
- Okey Dokey (disambiguation)
- Oakie (disambiguation)
- Oke (disambiguation)
- Okie (disambiguation)
