= Okechukwu Ofiaeli =

Nigerian environmental artist

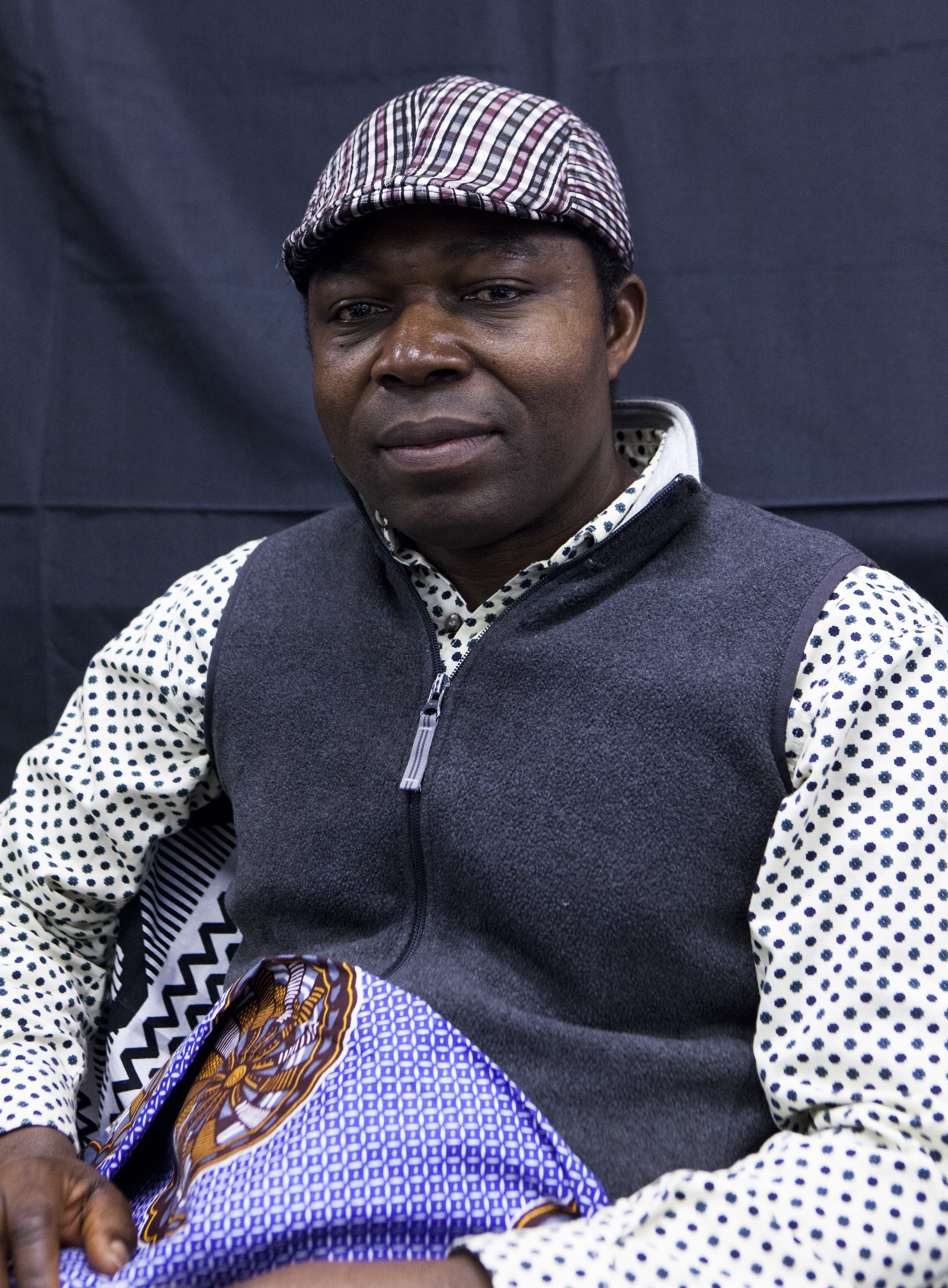
- Artist Okechukwu Okegrass Ofiaeli
- Known for: sculpture

Okechukwu Ofiaeli (Okechukwu Okoye Ofiaeli, also known as Okegrass Ofiaeli, or Okey Ofiaeli) is a Nigerian environmental artist based in Queens, New York.

== Early life and education ==
Ofiaeli was born in Lagos, Nigeria into a family of artists. Although he had no formal art training, Ofiaelie began studying local hand crafting in 1983 and studied at the National Gallery of Crafts/Design until 2004.

== Career ==
Ofiaeli's work began when he had no money to buy a sun hat to shade his eyes while watching football. He saw the referee wearing a woven straw hat and emulated that hat from coconut tree cuttings from his father's yard. From the popularity of his hat, Ofiaeli was inspired to explore this medium, riding the area between fine art and craft. Witnessing industrial processes in his native Nigeria also inspired his preference for recycling discarded materials as an alternative to the resulting burned landscape and killed their soil.

In 2000 he traveled to the US for the first time to be an artist in residence at 18th Street Art Center in Santa Monica, California. This experience brought attention from Nigeria's Federal Ministry of Arts and Culture to Ofiaeli's work in Lagos where they then built a national workshop for artists.

Ofiaeli's sculptures explore ecological impact using site-specific found materials. He kept a studio in Ebonyi, Nigeria to gather indigenous materials, particularly elephant grass. His studio staff gather grasses that would normally be set afire to hunt and clear the fields. Since this period, the value of this vegetation had shifted and new techniques had been developed to use it as a cash crop. In Santa Monica he used mahogany, palm, and mango seeds. In New York he used primarily fallen Sycamore tree parts.

In 2016 he was the Artist in Residence at Jamaica Center for Arts and Learning. He has run workshops to teach students how to up-cycle materials into works of art and utilitarian objects. These workshops have been taught in both his home in New York and in villages in Nigeria where they learn how to make these objects from repurposed discarded materials and sell them for profit.

In 2003 he won an International Fund for the Promotion of Culture grant. In 2011 his work was exhibited at Chashama Gallery in New York. In 2015 Ofiaeli received a Queens Council of the Arts Individual Artist Grant to bring his workshops around the region. One of these workshops was offered alongside his exhibition in the Southeast Queens Biennial in 2018. This exhibition was curated by No Longer Empty at York College and also featured work by Janet Henry, Shervone Neckles and Damali Abrams. Also in 2018 Ofiaeli work was featured at the Korean Cultural Center, New York, to commemorate the winter olympics in PyeongChang.

His work is in the public collections of the National Museum in Badagry, the Goethe Instut in Lagos, the Japan External Trade Organization Lagos and the 18th Street Arts Center.
