= Okechukwu Amah =

Nigerian academic

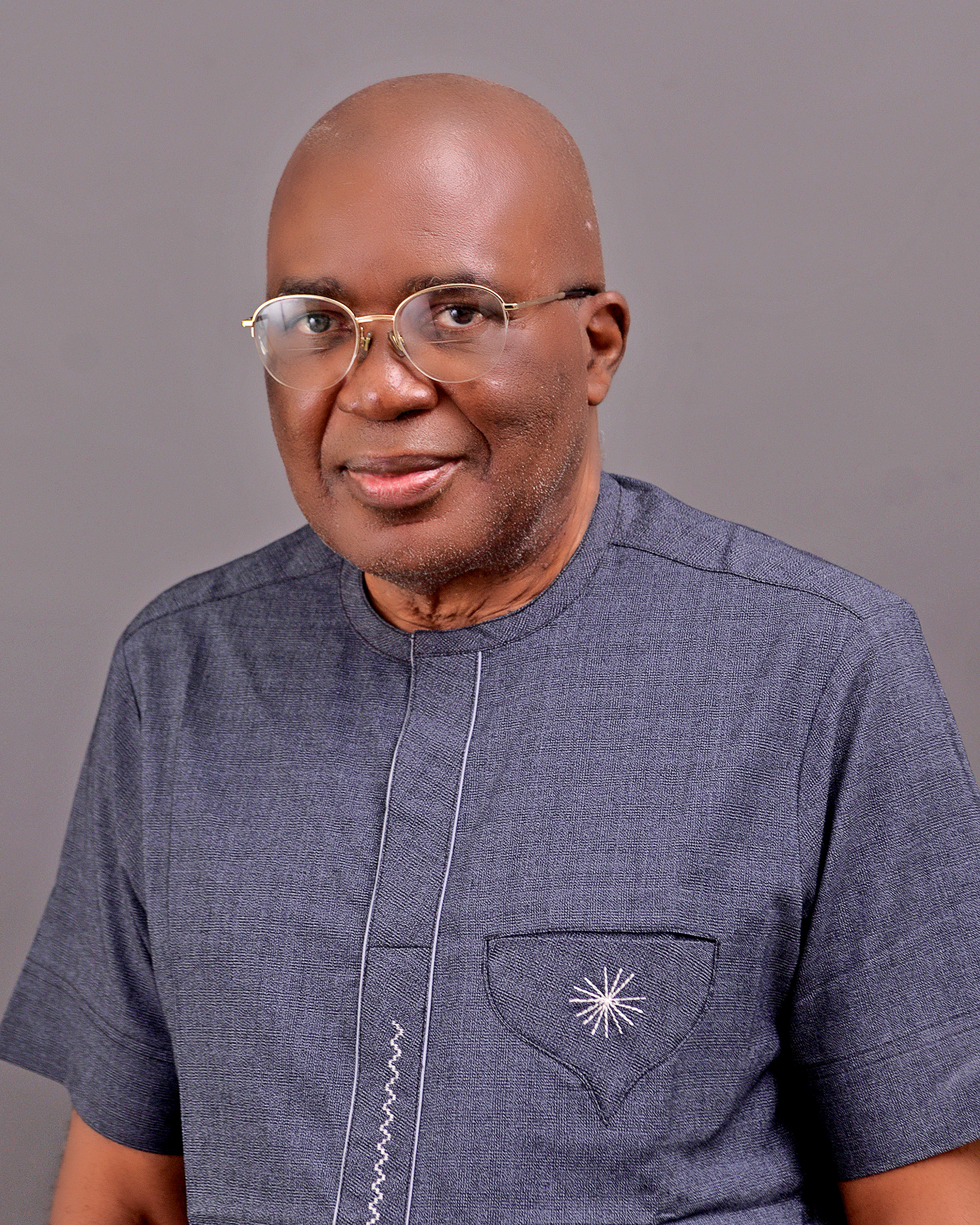
- Education: University of Ibadan; University of Benin
- Occupations: Petroleum engineer and business administration academic
- Employer: Lagos Business School

Okechukwu Amah (listern) is a Nigerian petroleum engineer and business administration academic. He is a faculty member and teaches Human Resources, Leadership, and Human Behavior in Organizations at Lagos Business School. He also serves as the research director at Lagos Business School, Pan-Atlantic University, Nigeria. Okechukwu has over 31 years of experience working at Chevron Nigeria Limited, where he held a range of managerial positions.

== Education ==
Okechukwu obtained his first degree in Petroleum Engineering from the University of Ibadan. He also obtained a Master's in Business Administration and a Ph.D. in Business Administration (Organisational behaviour) from the University of Benin.

== Life ==
Okechukwu began his career as a petroleum engineer with Texaco Overseas Nigeria Limited. During his tenure there, he held key positions such as district petroleum engineer and assistant district manager. He was appointed production manager before the company merged with Chevron Nigeria Limited. Then he joined Chevron Nigeria Limited, holding other pivotal positions before leaving the company.

Okechukwu joined the faculty at Lagos Business School after 31 years as a senior executive with Chevron Nigeria Ltd. His research areas include leadership, work-life balance, and work attitudes. Among his professional associations, he is a member of the Society of Petroleum Engineers, the Nigerian Academy of Management, the American Academy of Management, the Society of Human Resources Management, and the Southern Management Society. Okechukwu is an author, and has published many academic papers and case studies in scholarly journals around the world. Currently, he serves on the board of the Institute for Work and Family Integration along with Lagos Business School dean Chris Ogbechie.

== Selected works ==
- Amah, Okechkwu (2023). Resolving the African Leadership Challenge: Insight From History. Emerald Publishing Limited
- Amah, E. Okechukwu & Ogah, Marvel (2021). Work-life Integration in Africa: A Multidimensional Approach to Achieving Balance. Palgrave Macmillan. ISBN 978-3030691127
- Amah, Okechukwu(2018).Globalization and Leadership in Africa: Developments and Challenges for the Future.Palgrave Pivot. ISBN 978-3319987637
- Amah, O. E. (2009). Job satisfaction and turnover intention relationship: the moderating effect of job role centrality and life satisfaction. Research and Practice in Human Resource Management, 17(1), 24–35.
- Amah, O. E. (2018). Determining the antecedents and outcomes of servant leadership. Journal of General Management, 43(3), 126–138.
- Amah, O. E., & Oyetunde, K. (2019). Human resources management practice, job satisfaction, and affective organizational commitment relationships: The effects of ethnic similarity and difference. SA Journal of Industrial Psychology, 45(1), 1–11.
- Amah, O. E. (2010). Family-work conflict and the availability of work-family friendly policy relationship in married employees: the moderating role of work centrality and career consequence. Research & Practice in Human Resource Management, 18(2).
- Amah, O. E. (2018). Employee engagement in Nigeria: The role of leaders and boundary variables. SA Journal of Industrial Psychology, 44(1), 1–8.
