= Oke (name) =

Oke is both a surname and a given name. Notable people with the name include:

Surname:

- Alan Oke, British tenor, who began his career as a baritone, making the transition to tenor in 1992
- Assogba Oké (1903–1973), Beninese politician and diplomat
- Ayo Oke (born 2003), American soccer player
- Femi Oke (born 1966), British television presenter and journalist
- Harris R. Oke (1891–1940), veteran of World War 1 in the 1st Battalion, Newfoundland Regiment and 11th (Service) Battalion, Royal Scots, and served in the North Russia Relief Force during the Archangel Campaign. Became Colonial Secretary, The Gambia, British West Africa (1934-1940) and served for extended periods as its Acting Governor and Commander-in-Chief. He fell ill while participating in a strategic war conference at the Government House in Lagos, Nigeria in November 1940 and was given a military funeral with full honors
- Janette Oke (born 1935), Canadian author
- John Beverley Oke (1928–2004), North American astronomer, professor at the California Institute of Technology and associate director of Hale Observatories, who developed methods to analyze light emitted by fast-receding objects located billions of light-years away
- Leslie Warner Oke (born 1877), Canadian farmer and political figure
- Michael Allen Oke was a First Lieutenant with the 201st Military Intelligence Battalion, 8th US Army (1966-1967). His oral personal narrative of service in Korea is in the collection of the Veterans History Project Database (American Folklife Center, Library of Congress)
- Robert Oke (1794–1870), first Chief Inspector for the Newfoundland Lighthouse Service (1855 to 1870), published a 64-page book of early lighthouse designs in 1861, installed the first light mechanism (from Bell Rock) at the Cape Bonavista lighthouse in 1842, installed the famous Isle of May light mechanism at the Cape Pine lighthouse in 1850, which was later moved to Harbor Grace Island and finally to Cape Bonavista
- Tosin Oke (born 1980), Nigerian track and field athlete
- William Austin Oke, Esq. (1857-1923), Owner, Munn & Oke, Ltd., publisher of The Harbor Grace Standard newspaper, Liberal member of the Newfoundland House of Assembly (elected 1897, 1900, 1904), then Judge of the District Court, Harbour Grace, Newfoundland

Given name:

- Japanese Oke house, members of Japanese nobility distantly, but directly, related to the Japanese Emperor
- Oke Akpoveta (born 1991), Nigerian professional footballer
- Oak Smith (1894–1974), also known as "Oke", American football player and coach
- William Oke Manning (20 October 1879 – 2 April 1958) was an English aeronautical engineer and officer in the Royal Navy, who designed flying boats and the English Electric Wren ultralight monoplane
- William Oke Manning (1809–1878), a legal writer, he published the first English treatise on 'Commentaries on the Law of Nations' (1839) and 'Remarks upon Religious Tests at the English Universities' (1846)
