= Okie Adams =

American banjo maker

- Born: Carl Adams; June 18, 1923
- Died: November 16, 2007 (aged 84) Eagle Rock, Los Angeles, USA
- Occupation: Musician

Okie Adams (June 18, 1923 – November 16, 2007), born Carl Frederick Adams, was an American expert banjo maker, having provided unique, hand-crafted banjos to the likes of Doc Watson and Tom Sauber, among many others.

== Career ==
Okie's banjos were entirely hand-made using his custom 'block pot' technique, which consisted of turning out a glued together ring of wood, usually walnut or maple, or a combination thereof. They are heavier than most, with a slightly wider neck (Okie claims this was favored by the guitar players he was trying to convert to banjo) and often the peghead is inlaid with a variety of shapes and symbols that are Okie signatures - a tall cowboy hat, claw hammer or double claw hammer, and a crescent moon with star.

Allen Hart uses an Okie Adams banjo on his "Old Time Banjo" album, playing in the claw-hammer style Okie favored and encouraged.

Okie was a consistent presence on the West Coast folk festival circuit, and his son Jim 'Okie Jr.' Adams plays and competes often, wielding his father's prized banjos. Always a teacher, Okie's generosity touched and inspired many musicians and banjo makers, among them Greg Deering, founder of Deering Banjo company who recently stated that he'd produced and sent out over 60,000 banjos from his workshop and "there was a part of Okie Adams in every single one."

He was also an accomplished race-car component maker, known for the Okie Adams "drop axle" he developed whilst working as a welder in 'blairs' automotive of Pasadena during the 1960s.

== Death ==
Adams died at the age of 84 of smoke inhalation when his home in Eagle Rock, California, burned down on November 16, 2007. The exact cause of the fire has yet to be determined conclusively.
