= James Honyman =

The Reverend James Honyman
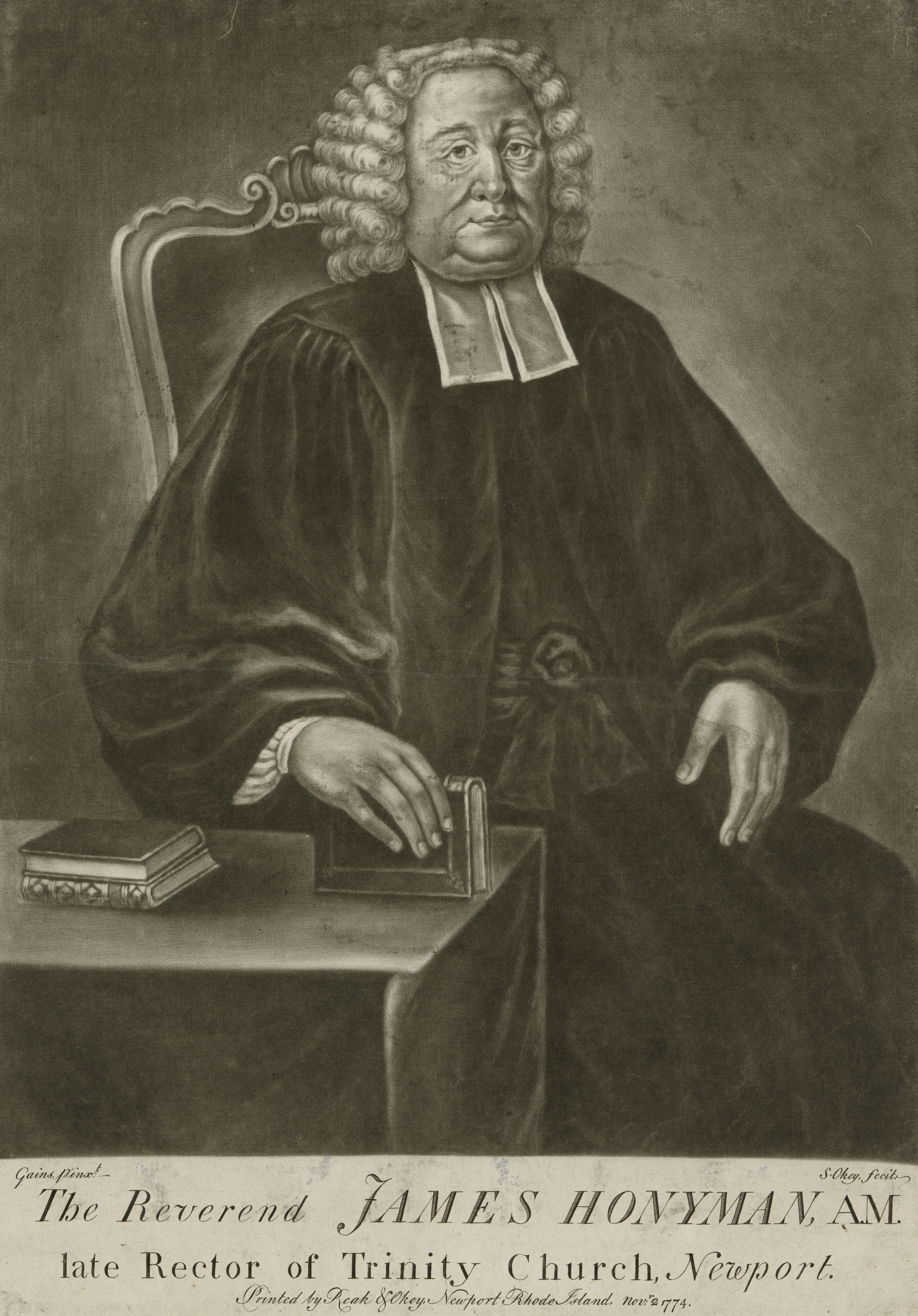
- Mezzotint Portrait by Samuel Okey, 1774 after the original oil portrait by G. Gains

2nd Minister of Trinity Church, Newport, Rhode Island
- In office 1704–1750
- Preceded by: The Rev. John Lockier
- Succeeded by: The Rev. Jeremiah Leaming

Personal details
- Born: ca.1675 Kinneff, Scotland
- Died: July 4, 1750 (aged 74–75) Newport, Rhode Island
- Children: James Honyman, Jr. (Attorney General)

The Reverend James Honyman (ca. 1675 – 1750) served as a chaplain in the Royal Navy before becoming a missionary for the Society for the Propagation of the Gospel on Long Island and Newport, Rhode Island. As a minister of Trinity Church, Newport, from 1704 to 1750, he inspired the creation of a number of Anglican parishes in Colonial Rhode Island and oversaw the construction of Trinity Church, Newport in 1724-1726.

== Early life and family ==
The son and namesake of The Reverend James Honyman (1629-25 May 1693) and Mary Leask Honyman, he was born about 1675 at Kinneff, Kincardineshire, now part of Aberdeenshire, where his father was the settled minister from 1663 to 1693. One of his father's brothers was The Right Reverend Andrew Honeyman, Bishop of Orkney (1664-1678), while another was The Reverend Robert Honyman, minister of St. Andrews, Scotland.

== Naval career ==
The Bishop of London, the Right Reverend Henry Compton, certified to the Navy Board on 16 June 1699 that James Honeyman was qualified to receive a warrant as a Chaplain in the Royal Navy. He was assigned to the fourth-rate, 48-gun HMS Advice, commanded by Captain Robert Wynn. In April 1700, the ship was ordered to New England to bring home for trial the pirate Captain William Kidd. The Governor of New York, Massachusetts, and New Hampshire, Richard Coote, 1st Earl of Bellomont, had imprisoned Kidd in Boston's Stone Prison. The Massachusetts authorities transferred Kidd and several others from the prison to the HMS Advice, where they remained under close confinement for three weeks before the ship sailed for London. As the ship's chaplain, Honyman ministered to the condemned men during the weeks in port as well as on the voyage back to England.

A year later in 1700, The Admiralty ordered the ship back to America under its new commanding officer, Captain William Caldwell, this time to New York City. Honyman remained the ship's chaplain on this second deployment. On his second deployment, the ship called at Boston, Massachusetts, and remained in port there from May to early July, 1701, before sailing on to New York. On his previous visit to Boston, he had likely made the acquaintance of The Reverend Samuel Myles at King's Chapel in Boston. At some point, Myles took Honyman to Newport, Rhode Island, where he placed him in temporary charge of Trinity Church's newly built church until his ship was ready to return to England. Honyman's summer ministry in Newport lasted until 8 September 1701, when HMS Advice appeared in Newport's Harbor to fetch him. During these months, Chaplain Honyman had the first sight of his future parish and, at the same time, met the woman he would eventually marry, Abigail Carr, daughter of a local merchant and a Trinity parish benefactor. After leaving Newport, Honyman remained in naval service until December 1702.

== Missionary career in North America ==
=== At Jamaica, New York ===
Soon after leaving the Royal Navy, Honyman applied to the recently chartered Society for the Propagation of the Gospel in Foreign Parts (SPG) for a missionary appointment in North America. By this time, the Newport position was already filled by the Rev. John Lockier and no longer open to Honyman. In Newport's place, the governing body of the SPG selected Honyman to be the new minister of the church at Jamaica on Long Island, New York.

Honyman embarked in April 1703 on board a merchant ship named Portsmouth Galley for his passage to America. The trip took four months as the ship had to wait for a naval escort to convoy her during the early phase of the War of the Spanish Succession. Honyman finally landed at Boston in October 1703, traveled overland first to Newport, then onward to Jamaica.

At Jamaica, Honyman faced an unexpected issue. On his previous visit to New York as a naval chaplain, Honyman had rented a room in a private house. During his residence there, the authorities arrested a woman who worked in the house, accusing her of prostitution and of killing a child. During her trial after Honyman's departure, the woman accused Honyman of being scandalously intimate with the homeowner. When the congregation in Jamaica heard that the SPG was sending Honyman to be the rector of their church, they objected strenuously to the Governor of New York, Lord Cornbury. Cornbury wrote to the Rev. John Lockier in Newport and suggested that the two clergymen exchange places. Lockier declined the offer due to illness, so Honyman carried on despite the outcry. Later, some of his parishioners spoke highly of his work in Jamaica, but some opposition remained.

In April 1704, the Rev. John Lockier died in Newport, and the congregation in Rhode Island appealed to Lord Cornbury for a replacement. Cornbury replied that he would apply on their behalf to Bishop Compton for a permanent replacement. In the meantime, he offered Honyman's services on a temporary basis until a final choice could be made.

=== Initial years of conflict in Newport, Rhode Island ===
Honyman arrived in Newport in late July or early August 1704. Rumor and innuendo quickly followed him from New York. Parishioners on both sides in Newport wrote to the SPG in London both supporting and criticizing Honyman. The new dispute thwarted an earlier attempt to have the Rev. Christopher Bridge from Boston take the Newport position, which was intended to resolve Bridge's longstanding dispute in Boston with the Rev. Samuel Myles and the dispute over Honyman's appointment. The dispute dragged on for several years as New York clergy and parishioners wrote to London to support Honyman. Further tension arose as Bridge attempted to seize control of the Newport church building. The two parties engaged in a series of lockouts and break-ins between 1706 and 1708.

Finally, Honyman decided to sail for London and put his case personally before the SPG. The group opposing Honyman appealed to the Governor of Rhode Island and Providence Plantations, Samuel Cranston, but he declined to interfere in the ecclesiastical matter. The Royal Governor of Massachusetts, Joseph Dudley had no such qualms. Honyman's arrival, the SPG referred the case to Bishop Compton and the Archbishop of Canterbury, Thomas Tenison. After due consideration, Bishop Compton and Archbishop Tenison exonerated Honyman and sent him back to take charge in Newport. Returning to Newport on 19 March 1709, Honyman found that resentment still lingered, and a number of people were still pushing in support of Bridge. The SPG resolved the issue by directing Bridge to take the church in Rye, New York, leaving Honyman in Newport. By late June 1709, Honyman had been able to bring peace to the parish.

As the culminating mark of the happy conclusion to the years of dispute, the rector, vestry, and parish sent an address to Queen Anne, declaring their shared belief in the relationship between church and state, along with the value it placed on public service. This document contrasted with the predominantly Quaker views that had dominated in Rhode Island up to this point.

== Death and burial ==
Reverend Honyman died in Newport on July 2, 1750, after serving as rector of Trinity Church for 46 years. He was buried in the churchyard of Trinity Church.
