= Shannon Okey =

American writer and knit designer (born 1975)

Shannon Okey (born January 6, 1975) is an American writer and knit designer.

== Biography ==
Okey was born in 1975 in Medina, Ohio.

She learnt to knit in her twenties, being taught by her aunt. She has said that her family background is one where "art and craft [are] part of everyday life". Okey began the knitgrrl.com blog in 1999. She had previously worked as a stockbroker. She has spoken about knitting being a way for people with "ordinary" body shapes to get clothes that fit them well, and also to find clothes that reflect one's personality.

Her book Knitgrrl appeared on the New York Public Library's 2006 Books for the Teen Age list, a list of titles recommended by librarians for younger audiences, and also received a starred review from Booklist. Knitgrrl 2 was nominated for a CraftTrends Award of Creative Excellence in December 2006. Both Knitgrrl books are designed to teach beginning knitters and feature colorful illustrations by Canadian illustrator and webcomic artist Kathleen Jacques. Okey's book Alt Fiber received a 2008 "Proggy" award for "Most Animal-Friendly Craft Book."

Okey has been featured on several television shows, including Uncommon Threads, Crafters Coast to Coast and Knitty Gritty. She has curated and appeared in national fiber arts shows at galleries including Assemble Gallery and New York-based artist Cynthia von Buhler's CVBSpace. Photos of both shows, including Okey's own work, were published in the summer 2006 issue of knit.1 magazine.

During a 2006 podcast interview with Marie Irshad of KnitCast, Okey discussed her interest in fashion, not just knitting, and the designs she created for a "computational couture" show called Seamless in Boston. Okey is also a frequent contributor to knitting-related magazines such as Yarn Market News, and was a columnist for knit.1 magazine. She began editing British knitting magazine Yarn Forward in 2008, but left the magazine to focus on her own publishing company, Cooperative Press.

As of 2007, Okey lives in Cleveland, Ohio.

== Publications ==
- Knitgrrl (Watson-Guptill Publications, 2005) ISBN 0-8230-2618-3
- Knitgrrl 2 (Watson-Guptill Publications, 2006) ISBN 0-8230-2619-1
- Spin to Knit (Interweave Press, 2006) ISBN 1-59668-007-5
- Crochet Style (Creative Homeowner, 2007) ISBN 1-58011-331-1
- Felt Frenzy (with Heather Brack, Interweave Press, 2007) ISBN 1-59668-009-1
- AlterNation (with Alexandra Underhill, North Light Books, 2007) ISBN 1-58180-978-6
- Just Socks (as editor, Potter Craft, 2007) ISBN 0-307-34595-5
- Just Gifts (as editor, Potter Craft, 2007) ISBN 0-307-34596-3
- The Pillow Book (Chronicle Books, 2008) ISBN 0-8118-6085-X
- How To Knit in the Woods (Mountaineers, 2008) ISBN 1-59485-088-7
- Alt Fiber (Ten Speed Press, 2008) ISBN 1-58008-915-1
- The Knitgrrl Guide to Professional Knitwear Design (Cooperative Press, 2010) ISBN 0-9792017-1-3
