= Herbert Pugh =

Herbert Pugh (fl. 1758–1788) was an Irish landscape-painter.

== Life ==
Pugh was born in Ireland, and came to London about 1758. He lived in the Piazza, Covent Garden. He drank to the detriment of his health, and died soon after 1788.

== Works ==
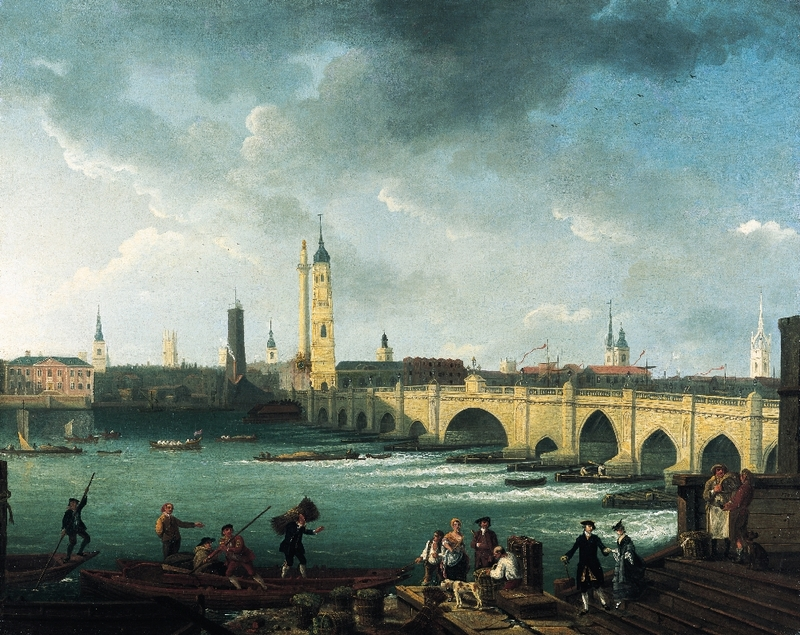
London Bridge from Pepper Alley Stairs by Herbert Pugh

Pugh was a contributor to the first exhibition of the Society of Artists in 1760, sending a ‘Landscape with Cattle.’ In 1765 he gained a premium at the Society of Arts, and in 1766 was a member of the newly incorporated Society of Artists. He continued exhibiting with them up to 1776. He tried his hand at some pictures in the manner of William Hogarth, but without great success, although some of these pictures were engraved.

A large landscape by Pugh went to the Lock Hospital. Two views of London Bridge by him were in the Century of British Art exhibition at the Grosvenor Gallery in 1888.

== Notes ==
Attribution

This article incorporates text from a publication now in the public domain: Lee, Sidney, ed. (1896). "Pugh, Herbert". Dictionary of National Biography. Vol. 47. London: Smith, Elder & Co.
