= June Opie =

New Zealand polio survivor and writer (1924–1999)

- Born: Alice June Norma Opie; June 27, 1924; New Plymouth, New Zealand
- Died: August 25, 1999 (aged 75); Bulahdelah, New South Wales, Australia
- Citizenship: New Zealand
- Education: New Plymouth Girls' High School; Auckland Training College: Teaching qualification (1943); Christchurch Training College: Speech therapy qualification (1944); Auckland University College : BA (1954).
- Occupations: Speech therapist; Clinical psychologist; Writer
- Years active: 1940s–1990s
- Known for: Disability rights advocacy; memoir Over My Dead Body
- Notable work: Over My Dead Body (1957); Come and Listen to the Stars Singing (1988); Over My Dead Body: Forty Years On (1996)
- Movement: Disability rights movement

Alice June Norma Opie (27 June 1924 – 25 August 1999), known as June Opie, was a New Zealand polio survivor, writer, campaigner and clinical psychologist.

== Early life and education ==
Opie was born in New Plymouth on 27 June 1924, and lived as a child in Mōkau, north Taranaki. She was educated at New Plymouth Girls' High School and then qualified in teaching at Auckland Training College and in speech therapy at Christchurch Training College. She worked as a speech therapist for Whāngārei education department, before setting sail for England in 1947, planning to stay two years to teach and to observe speech therapy clinics.

== Polio and later life ==
Opie contracted polio during the voyage, falling ill after two days in London. She was admitted to St Mary's Hospital and spent ten weeks in an iron lung. She then spent over a year in a plaster cast, and a total of two years in the hospital. She learned to walk with crutches and calipers, which was considered "a remarkable achievement given the extent of her initial paralysis". In 1949 she sailed back to New Zealand. At Auckland Hospital she was told she would spend the rest of her life living in institutions, at which point she left the hospital and moved first to her mother's home and then to a friend's spa-hotel in Helensville. In 1954 she graduated from the University of Auckland with a BA in philosophy.

She worked as a speech therapist and clinical psychologist, despite prejudice about her disability, and then had a research post with the Dadley trust, part of the Crippled Children's Society, before working in a prison and in a boys' welfare home.

In 1957 she published a memoir Over my dead body, to thank the many hospital staff and others who had helped her during her time at St Mary's. It became an international best-seller and was serialised in New Zealand Woman's Weekly, whose editor said it was "one of the finest books we have ever serialised". She produced a followup Over my dead body: Forty years on in 1996.

After the stress of fame brought by the book, and a car accident, doctors advised her to take a break. She travelled to England, and settled in Cornwall, where she lived until 1988. She supported herself by writing book reviews and magazine articles, and in 1986 published a biography of composer Priaulx Rainier: Come and Listen to the Stars Singing: Priaulx Rainier – A Pictorial Biography. She travelled widely, driving alone through Europe and the Middle East, including reaching Petra on horseback.

She campaigned for disability rights, was one of the founders in 1971 of the Association of Disabled Professionals, and spoke at Speakers' Corner in Hyde Park to oppose, successfully, Margaret Thatcher's government's plan to tax Mobility Allowance.

After 1988 she divided her time between Australia, where she had a home in New South Wales, and New Zealand, where she stayed with friends. Opie died from cancer on 25 August 1999, in Bulahdelah, New South Wales, Australia.

== Legacy ==
Opie established the June Opie Rose Trust in 1961, using the proceeds from the sale of a rose which had been named in her honour by Wilhelm Kordes II. The trust supported young disabled people with grants to buy a car or wheelchair, or for a mortgage. The trust was later combined with the Alan Cook Memorial Trust to form the Cook Opie Trust, which supports the purchase of IT equipment for people with physical disabilities in New Zealand.

The University of Auckland awards an annual June Opie Memorial Fellowship to offer financial support to a student with a severe disability.

== Selected publications ==
- Opie, June (1957). Over my dead body. Methuen.
- Opie, June (1988). Come and Listen to the Stars Singing: Priaulx Rainier – A Pictorial Biography. Alison Hodge. ISBN 9780906720172.
- Opie, June (1996). Over my dead body: Forty years on. Raupo. ISBN 978-0790004884.
