= Frank Okey =

American tennis and squash player (1919–2023)

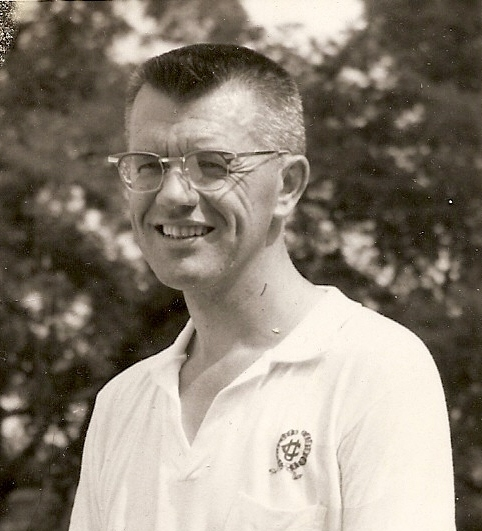
- Okey at the Tennis Club of Rochester in 1954

Personal information
- Born: Franciszek Krzysztof Okolowicz; December 16, 1919 Rochester, New York, U.S.
- Died: December 23, 2023 (aged 104) Pittsford, New York, U.S.

Achievements and titles
- Highest world ranking: No. 5 Senior '80s (1980)

Frank A. Okey (born Franciszek Krzysztof Okolowicz, December 16, 1919 – December 23, 2023) was an American tennis and squash champion, born in Rochester, New York, whose career spanned from 1929 until 1999. Okey won between 200 and 250 tennis tournaments between 1949 and 1999, including wins from throughout western New York State, Florida, and other regional, national, and international circuits. His local achievements in tennis include 85 tournament wins in the Rochester District Tennis Championships.

== Tennis career highlights ==
Okey was the first native of Rochester, New York, ever to play in the U.S. National Tennis Championships (US Open, 1952, Forest Hills, New York) where he was matched in the main draw against "America's chief hope" in the tournament--Vic Seixas. Okey won several Canada and Bermuda National Seniors titles between 1965 and 1975. His best national (United States Tennis Association) ranking was 5th between 1999 and 2004 in the Men's 80s singles. In his final tournament in 1999, he beat the Wimbledon Champion Gardnar Mulloy on grass in Orange NJ (6–3, 6–3). Other notable tournament opponents include Bobby Riggs.

== 70 years of tournament tennis ==
Okey played his first tennis tournament at age 10 and his last at 80. He shared some of the secrets of his athletic longevity in a 1990 news clip and in a 2019 article and news clip. He suspended tournament tennis in 1999 after his first stroke. He suffered a second stroke in 2000, but still practiced with a ball machine year round at the Tennis Club of Rochester. Okey died in Pittsford, New York, on December 23, 2023, at the age of 104.

== Selected wins and national rankings ==
Year	Title
1938–1942	Varsity Tennis, University of Rochester, 3 years
1943–1946	Military Service
1949–1969	Winner, District Doubles, 15 times
1950–1951	Winner, District Singles, 2 consecutive
1959–1967	Winner, Men's City Indoors Singles, 3 times
1963–1964	Winner, District 35+ Singles, 2 times
1965–1977	Winner, District Senior Singles, 12 consecutive
1965–1990	Winner, District Senior Doubles, 25 consecutive
1952	Player, U.S. (Open) Championship, Forest Hills, New York
1965	Winner, Canadian National Senior Singles
1965–1968	Winner, Lake Mohawk Tournament, 3 times and retired the trophy
1967–1972	Winner, Bermuda Invitational Senior Singles (2 times) and Doubles (4 times)
1975	Winner, Canadian National Senior 55+ Singles
1975–1990	Winner, Approximately 12 Tournaments sanctioned by the Florida Tennis Association
1976–1980	Winner, US National Senior Clay Consolation Championship, Washington, DC.
1980–1984	USTA National Ranking, 9 in Men's 60 Singles
1980–1985	Winner, US National Senior Grass Consolation Championship, Massachusetts
1982	Player, U.S. vs. Canada (Gordon Trophy) Senior Team Match
1985–1989	USTA National Ranking, 6 in Men's 65 Singles
1990–1994	USTA National Ranking, 7 in Men's 70 Singles
1995	Winner, Rogers Bowl Invitational Singles, Longwood Cricket Club
1999–2004	USTA National Ranking, 5 in Men's 80 Singles

== A squash champion, for tennis ==
In squash, Okey was ranked 4th in the Rochester area and won the University Club of Rochester Championship about 30 times in a row from 1950 to the 1980s. This record of wins is documented on a trophy that was last seen in a trophy display case at the University Club of Rochester. He played squash to keep in shape for tennis during winter months when indoor tennis was unavailable in Rochester.

== Accolades ==
Okey was a 1942 graduate of the University of Rochester, and was inducted into its Hall of Fame in 1996. At the age of 94, he was in the first class inducted to the newly formed Rochester Tennis Hall of Fame on July 11, 2014. Okey was also selected as a member of the Rochester Red Wings Frontier Field Walk of Fame Class of 2014. As part of this induction, he was selected to throw out the first pitch at a Rochester Red Wings Baseball baseball game on August 24, 2014. This is fitting since Okey was more successful than any of his peers at sneaking into Red Wings Baseball games during the early 1930s—under the center-field fence—indicating his devotion as a Red Wings fan.

== Self taught ==
Okey never took a tennis lesson due to his family's lack of money. He began learning the game at age 10 by hitting balls with his brother Ray on the cobblestone street outside their house (on Weaver Street) in Rochester's Polish Neighbourhood. They used heavy wooden tennis rackets that were won as a prize by their father (master cabinet maker Dominik Josef Okolowicz), who strung them with piano wire. At that time, Okey was given about 100 tennis balls by a member of the Tennis Club of Rochester after begging for balls through the fence. He practiced against any building or wall he could find and sometimes played against his brother at the Seneca Park tennis courts in Rochester. He read all the books on tennis he could find in the Central Library of Rochester.

== A winning style ==
Okey's unusual technique, including his natural preference of hitting the ball with a slice, contributed to his success and frustrated opponents throughout his career. This advantageous style likely emerged from the lack of formal tennis lessons and his use of squash as a training method. He is known as a smart player who rarely gave opponents balls that were easy to hit, and who made them run around the court. Throughout his career, he has practiced his serve and ground strokes on an empty court or against a backboard or with a ball machine.

== No physical training ==
Other than Squash, Okey did not employ physical training such as weight training or road running outside of the game itself. He says that his 6-mile daily walk between his home on Weaver Street in Rochester and Aquinas High School gave his legs strength and stamina on the court. This lack of time spent in physical training may partially explain his longevity in the sport. He was, however, always devoted with practicing his serve on a practice court as well as his ground strokes against a backboard. At the age of 90, tennis was still his main form of exercise and recreation. The social aspect of tennis also contributed to his longevity in the sport.
