= Okey Dokey =

Okey Dokey, Okie Dokie, or Oki Doki may refer to:

- Okey dokey (or okey-dokey), an alternate form of "okay"
- "Okey Dokey", a 2015 song by Zico and Song Min-ho
- "Okey Dokey" (SKE48 song), released in 2011
- Okie Dokie It's The Orb on Kompakt, a 2005 album by the Orb
- "Oki doki", a song from Lithuania in the Junior Eurovision Song Contest 2010
- Oki Doki, a fictional planet in the 2013 animated television series Q Pootle 5
- Oki Doki, a character in the Pee-Wee's Playhouse 1990 episode "Accidental Playhouse"

== See also ==
- Oakie Doke, a British children's television programme (1995–1997)
- Oaky Doaks, an American comic strip (1935–1961)
- Oki Doki Doc, a Philippine sitcom (1993–2000)
