= Trinity Church (Newport, Rhode Island) =

Historic church in Rhode Island, United States

- U.S. National Register of Historic Places
- U.S. National Historic Landmark
- U.S. National Historic Landmark District – Contributing property
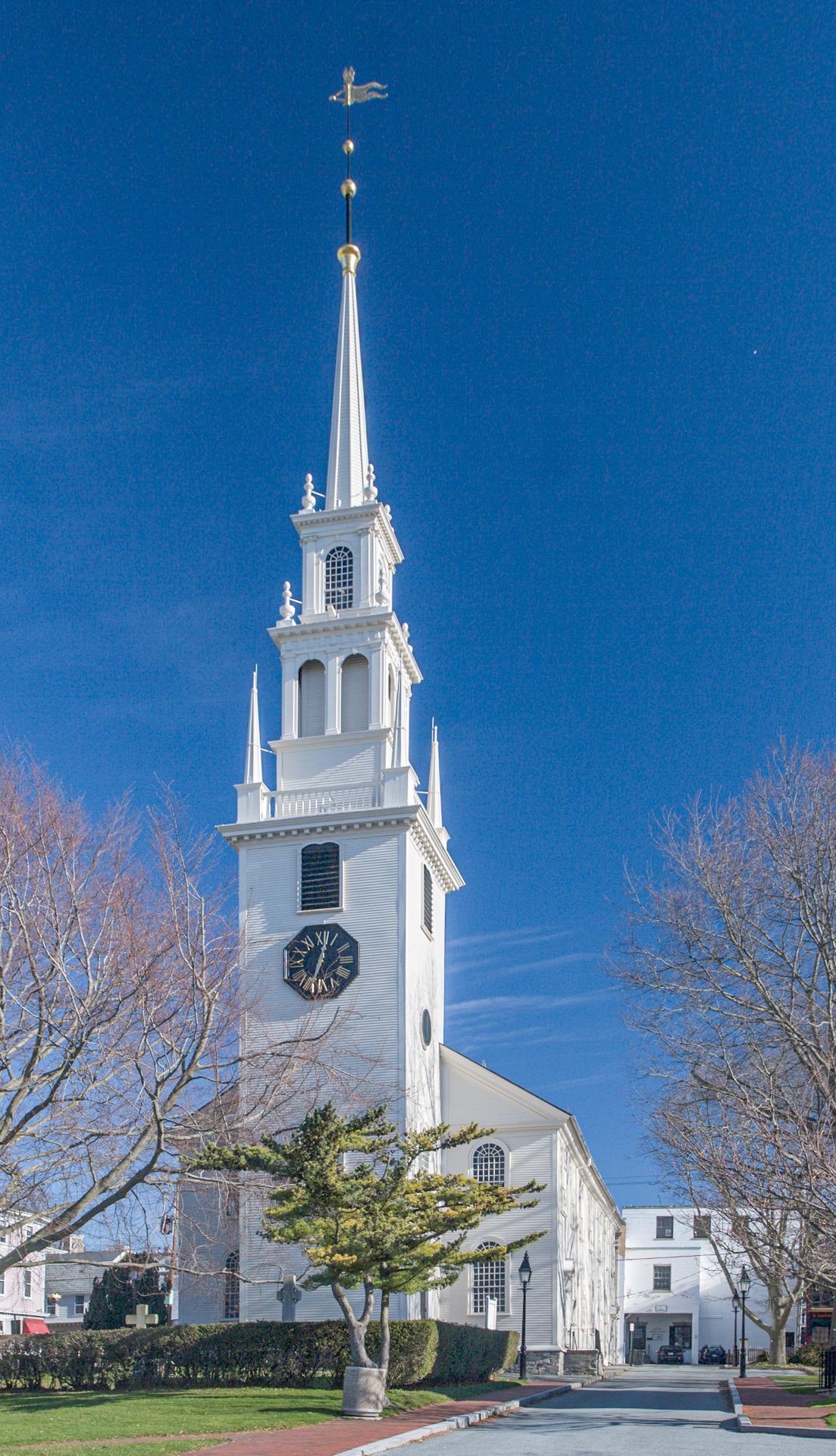
- Front view of church and steeple

- Location within Rhode Island Location within the United States
- Location: Queen Anne Square, Newport, Rhode Island
- Coordinates: 41°29′15″N 71°18′50″W
- Built: 1726/1698
- Architect: Richard Munday
- Architectural style: Georgian
- Part of: Newport Historic District (ID68000001)
- NRHP reference No.: 68000004

Significant dates
- Added to NRHP: November 24, 1968
- Designated NHL: November 24, 1968
- Designated NHLDCP: November 24, 1968

Trinity Church, on Queen Anne Square in Newport, Rhode Island, is a historic parish church in the Episcopal Diocese of Rhode Island. Founded in 1698, it is the oldest Episcopal parish in the state. In the mid 18th century, the church was home to the largest Anglican congregation in New England.

The current Georgian building was designed by architect Richard Munday and constructed in 1725–26. It is one of the largest extant 18th century New England churches and has been designated a National Historic Landmark since 1968.

The church reported 615 members in 2015 and 293 members in 2023; no membership statistics were reported in 2024 parochial reports. Plate and pledge income reported for the congregation in 2024 was $420,181. Average Sunday attendance (ASA) in 2024 was 114 persons. This was a relative decrease from ASA of 200 persons reported in 2018.

== History ==
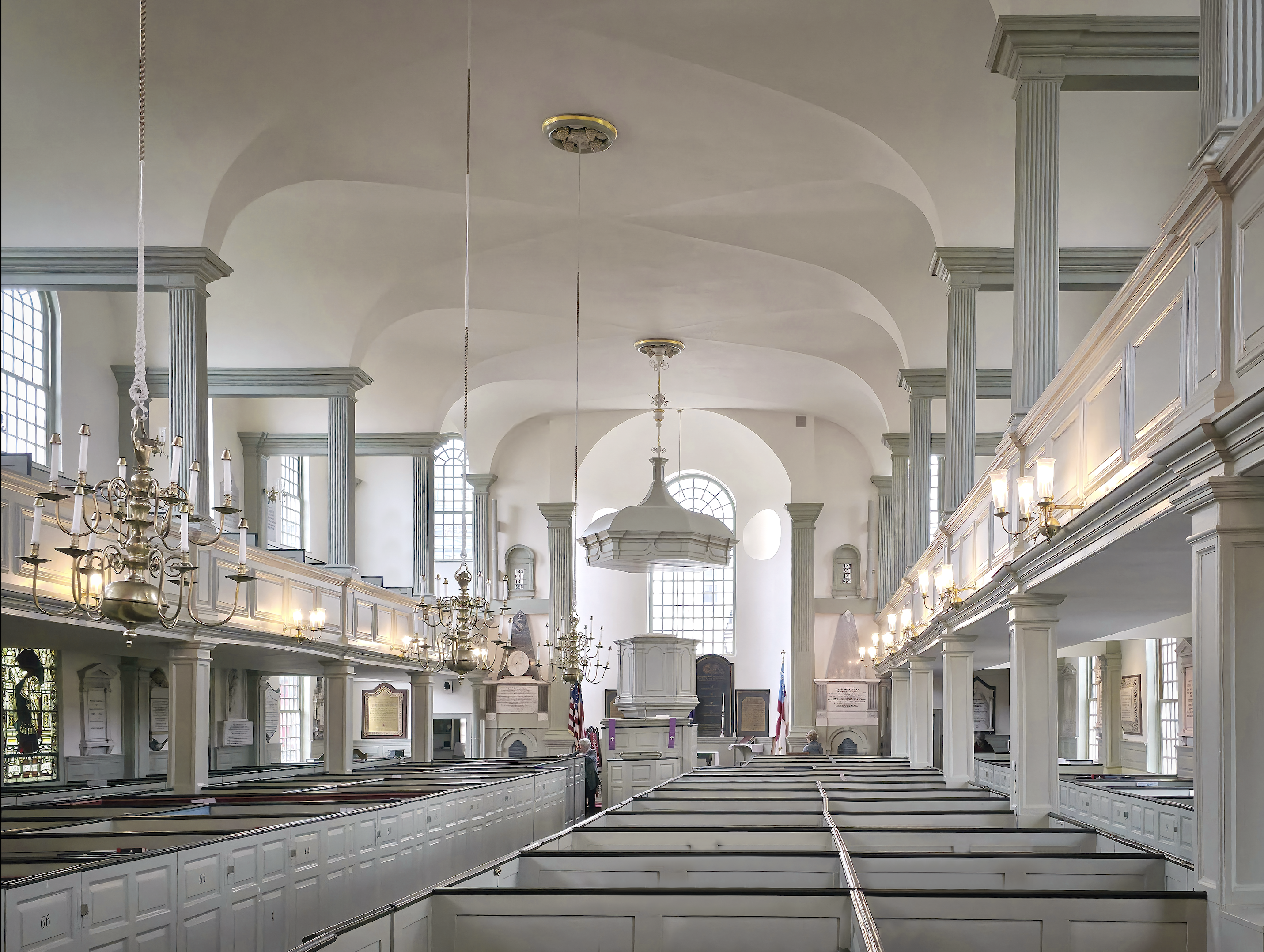
Interior of the Church

The Newport, Rhode Island congregation began to gather about 1698. When Richard Coote, 1st Earl of Bellomont was investigating charges of the infractions of the Navigation Acts in Rhode Island, he requested that the Board of Trade send a minister from England to Rhode Island. The first church structure was built in 1700.

The present church building was constructed in 1725–26, designed by local builder Richard Munday, who based his designs on those that he had seen that Sir Christopher Wren had used in London churches in the late 17th century. The church's design is very similar to that of Old North Church in Boston. Trinity, however, was built entirely of wood. It is believed to be the only church building with its three-tiered wineglass pulpit remaining in its original position in the center of the aisle, in front of the altar. The building was enlarged in 1762, but otherwise retains its original character with box pews.

In 1733, Dean George Berkeley donated the first organ, whose wooden case, decorated with the Crown of England and the mitres of the archbishops of Canterbury and York, survives in place. The first organist was Charles Theodore Pachelbel, son of the famous German Baroque composer Johann Pachelbel.

The church was used as a garrison church by the British Army in 1776–1779. Local oral tradition reports that George Washington attended services there in 1781. The Chevalier de Ternay, the French admiral who died in December 1780, is buried in the churchyard.

Also interred here is Dr. Sylvester Gardiner, who in 1753 purchased an immense tract of Maine wilderness where he founded what is now the city of Gardiner. Many members of the Vanderbilt family attended the church when summering in Newport.

Historical architect, Norman Isham, restored several parts of the church in the 1920s. The church has been seen in several films, including Amistad, Moonrise Kingdom and Evening. The burial service for former Rhode Island Senator Claiborne Pell was held at the church in January 2009.

The Rev. Canon Timothy Watt became Rector of the Parish in July, 2020.

== Notable clergy ==
- The Rev. George Berkeley
- The Rev. Theodore Dehon
- The Rev. James Honyman
- The Rev. Jeremiah Leaming
- The Rev. Walter Lowrie
- The Rev. Lauriston L. Scaife
- The Rev. Dr. Francis Vinton

== Notable organists ==
- Charles Theodore Pachelbel
- William Selby

== Notable parishioners ==
- John Jacob Astor VI
- Lillian Barrett
- Thomas Breese, U.S. Navy chaplain, Battle of Lake Erie
- Rear Admiral Henry E. Eccles
- Silvester Gardiner
- Rear Admiral Stephen B. Luce
- George Champlin Mason Sr.
- Clement Clarke Moore
- Vice President of the United States Levi Morton
- Richard Munday
- Claiborne Pell
- Commodore Oliver Hazard Perry
- Commodore Matthew C. Perry
- Vice Admiral William S. Pye
- Colonel Henry Sherburne (colonel)
- Admiral Raymond Spruance
- Gilbert Stuart
- George P. Wetmore
- Cornelius Vanderbilt II

== See also ==
- List of National Historic Landmarks in Rhode Island
- National Register of Historic Places listings in Newport County, Rhode Island

== Gallery ==
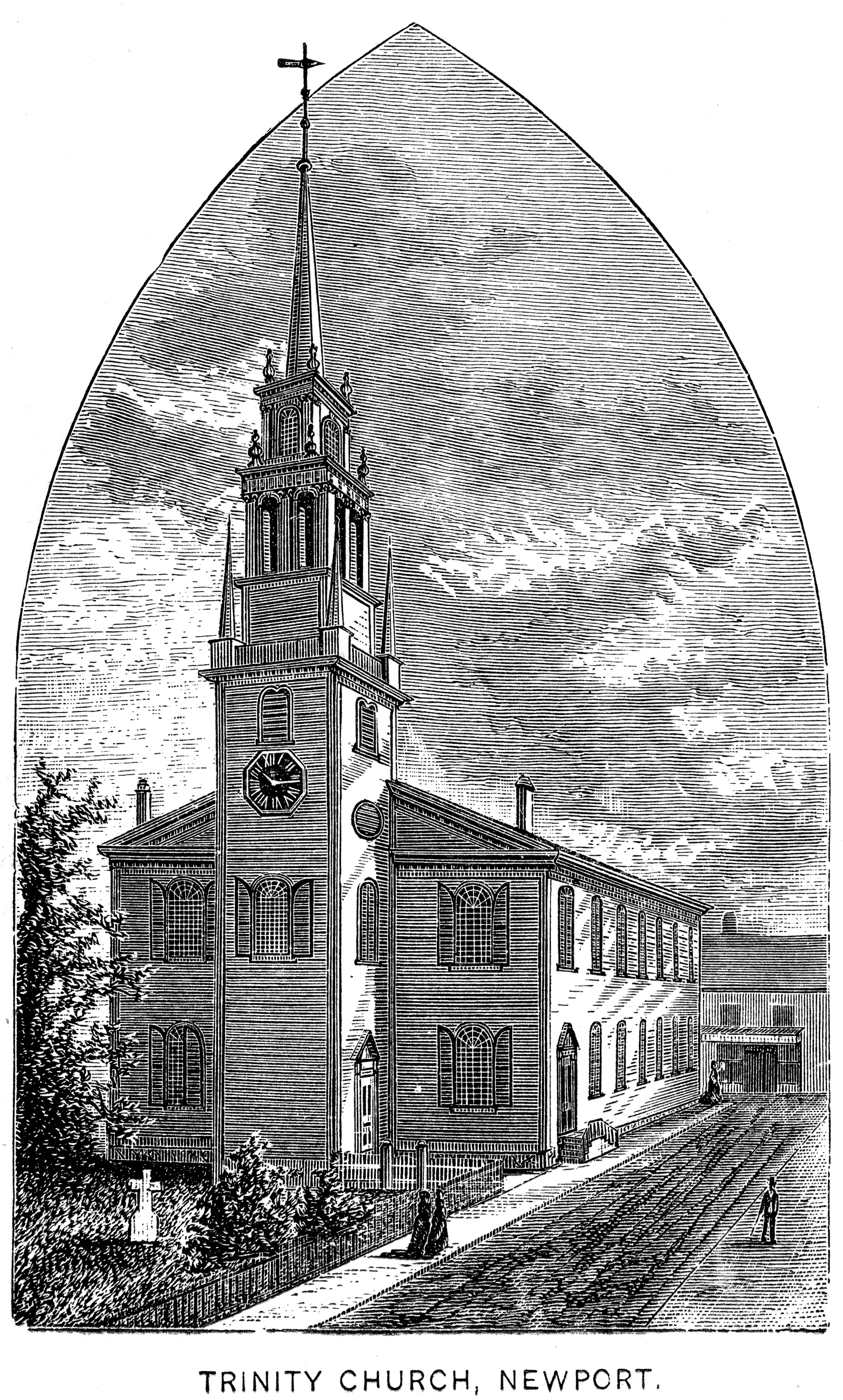
1886 engraving

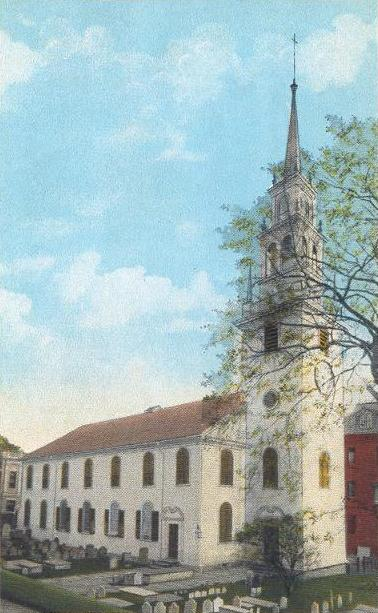
1920 postcard

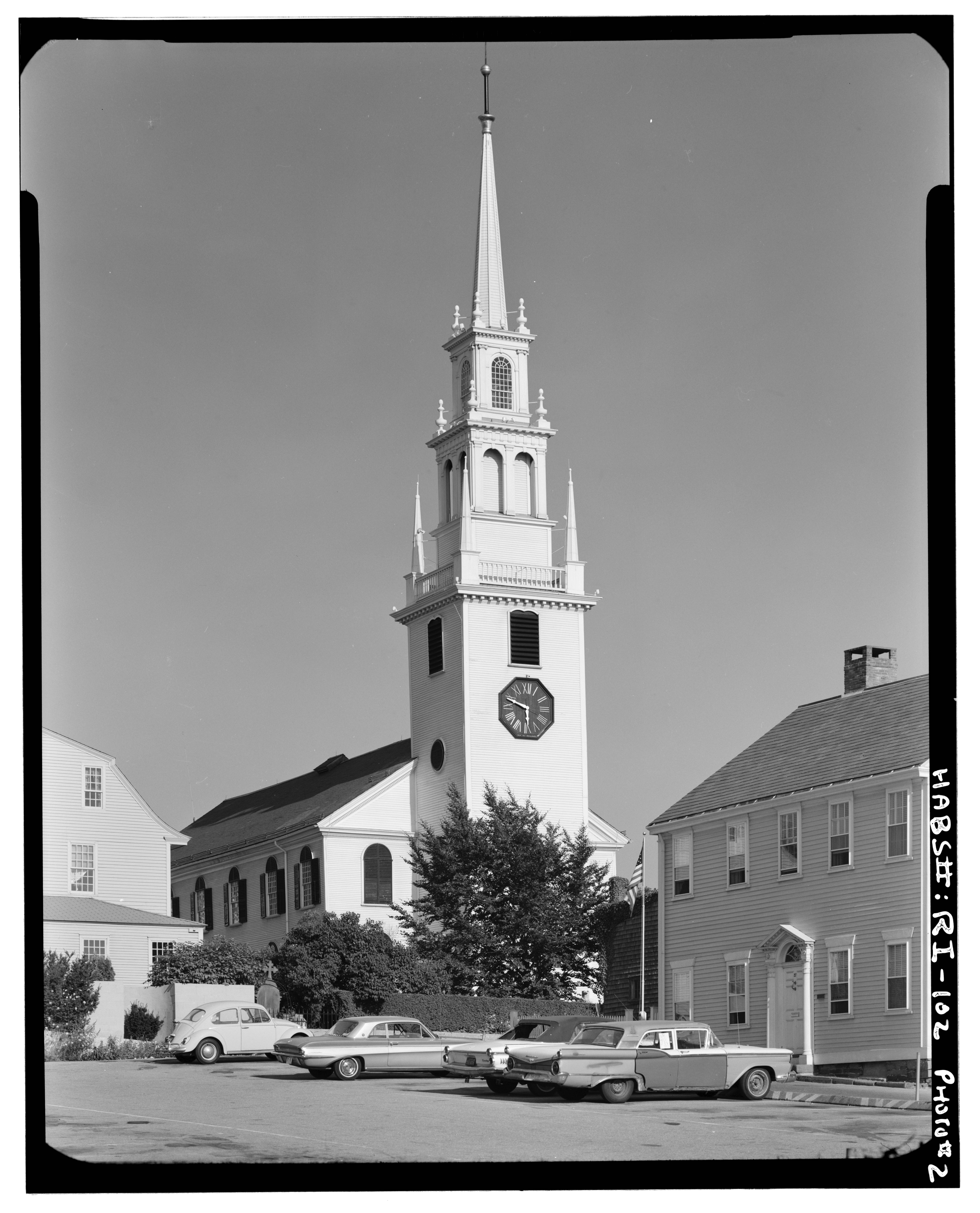
1970 photo
